= Office of inspector general (United States) =

Oversight division of a United States federal or state agency

In the United States, office of inspector general (OIG) is a generic term for the oversight division of a federal, state, or local government agency aimed at preventing inefficient or unlawful operations within their parent agency. Such offices are attached to many federal executive departments, independent federal agencies, as well as state and local governments. Each office includes an inspector general (or IG) and employees charged with identifying, auditing, and investigating fraud, waste, abuse, embezzlement and mismanagement of any kind within the executive department.

== History ==
In the United States, other than in the military departments, the first Office of Inspector General was established by act of Congress in 1976 under the Department of Health and Human Services to eliminate waste, fraud, and abuse in Medicare, Medicaid, and more than 100 other departmental programs. With approximately 1,600 employees, the HHS-OIG performs audits, investigations, and evaluations to recommend policy for decision-makers and the public.

Ronald Reagan terminated 16 inspectors general when he entered into office in 1981. His administration explained that Reagan intended to hire his own selections. After Congress objected, Reagan rehired five of those terminated.

George H. W. Bush also attempted to dismiss all the inspectors general when he became president in 1989, but relented after the inspectors general and Congress objected.

Barack Obama dismissed Corporation for National and Community Service inspector general Gerald Walpin citing a lack of confidence in him. After Congress objected to his lack of explanation, the Obama administration cited that Walpin had shown "troubling and inappropriate conduct", and pointed to an incident that year when Walpin was "disoriented" during a board meeting of the corporation, because of which the board requested Walpin's dismissal. Walpin sued for reinstatement, but the courts ruled against him.

In 2020, Donald Trump's first administration dismissed or replaced five inspectors general within six weeks. Two permanent inspectors general were dismissed and three acting inspectors general were replaced. Just after firing intelligence inspector general Michael Atkinson, Trump criticized Atkinson as having done a "terrible job" and that he "took a fake report and he brought it to Congress", in reference to the whistleblower complaint of the Trump–Ukraine scandal, which other testimony and evidence largely verified. Trump also described Atkinson as "not a big Trump fan". Around one month before Trump replaced Christi Grimm as acting health inspector general, he had called her report of shortages of medical supplies in American hospitals during the COVID-19 pandemic "wrong", "fake", and "her opinion", despite the report being based on a survey of 323 hospitals. Trump also questioned Grimm's motives for the report.

In 2025, during Trump's second administration, he summarily fired as many as seventeen U.S. inspectors general late the night of January 24. The individuals affected came from positions in the Pentagon, departments of State, Veterans Affairs and Interior. Trump did not provide Congress with 30 days’ advance notice or a written explanation of the rationale behind the firing, as required by the Inspector General Act of 1978 and the Securing Inspectors General Act of 2022. On February 12, eight of the inspectors general fired by Trump opened lawsuits arguing that the firings violated federal statutes and requesting to be reinstated to their positions.

== Authority ==
Council of Inspectors General on Integrity and Efficiency logo

The Inspector General Act of 1978 created 12 departmental inspectors general. Thirty years later, in October 2008, the Inspector General Reform Act of 2008 added IGs in various other areas. As of July 2014, there were 72 statutory IGs.

The offices employ special agents (criminal investigators, often armed) and auditors. In addition, federal offices of inspectors general employ forensic auditors, or "audigators", evaluators, inspectors, administrative investigators, and a variety of other specialists. Their activities include the detection and prevention of fraud, waste, abuse, and mismanagement of the government programs and operations within their parent organizations. Office investigations may be internal, targeting government employees, or external, targeting grant recipients, contractors, or recipients of the various loans and subsidies offered through the thousands of federal domestic and foreign assistance programs. The Inspector General Reform Act of 2008 (IGRA) amended the 1978 act by increasing pay and various powers and creating the Council of the Inspectors General on Integrity and Efficiency (CIGIE).

Example of an OIG report, from the DoD OIG (Note: Redacted version of the DoD Inspector General audit, obtained through the Freedom of Information Act by the Project on Government Oversight and others.)

Some inspectors general, the heads of the offices, are appointed by the president and confirmed by the Senate. For example, both the inspector general of the U.S. Department of Labor and the inspector general of the U.S. Agency for International Development are presidentially appointed. The remaining inspectors general are designated by their respective agency heads, such as the U.S. Postal Service inspector general. Presidentially appointed IGs can only be removed, or terminated, from their positions by the President of the United States, whereas designated inspectors general can be terminated by the agency head. However, in both cases Congress must be notified of the termination, removal, or reassignment.

While the IG Act of 1978 requires that inspectors general be selected based upon their qualifications and not political affiliation, presidentially appointed inspectors general are considered political appointees and are often selected, if only in part and in addition to their qualifications, because of their political relationships and party affiliation. An example of the role political affiliation plays in the selection of an inspector general, and the resulting pitfalls, can be seen in the 2001 Republican appointment (and resignation under fire) of Janet Rehnquist (daughter of former Chief Justice of the United States, William Rehnquist) to the post of inspector general for the U.S. Department of Health and Human Services.

While all of the federal offices of inspectors general operate separately from one another, they share information and some coordination through the Council of Inspectors General on Integrity and Efficiency. As of 2010, the CIGIE comprised 68 offices. In addition to their inspector general members, the CIGIE includes non-inspector general representatives from the federal executive branch, such as executives from the Office of Management and Budget, the Office of Personnel Management, the Office of Government Ethics, the Office of Special Counsel, and the Federal Bureau of Investigation. The CIGIE also provides specialized training to the inspector general community.

Further evidence of coordination between federal offices of inspectors general can be seen by the public through the offices' shared website, and the use of shared training facilities and resources, such as the Inspector General Criminal Investigator Academy (IGCIA), and their Inspector General Community Auditor Training Team (IGCATS), which are hosted by the U.S. Department of Homeland Security's Federal Law Enforcement Training Center (FLETC).

Evidence of the offices' return on investment to taxpayers can be seen through their semi-annual reports to Congress, most of which are available on each office's website.

Since the post-9/11 enactment of the Homeland Security Act of 2002, resulting in the amendment of the IG Act of 1978, Section 6e, most presidentially appointed IG special agents have had full law enforcement authority to carry firearms, make arrests, and execute search warrants. Prior to this time, most presidentially appointed IG and some designated IG special agents had the equivalent law enforcement authorities as a result of other statutes or annually required deputation by the U.S. Marshals Service. The 2002 amendment to the IG Act of 1978 made most deputation of presidentially appointed IG special agents unnecessary. Some designated IG special agents, however, still have full law enforcement authority today by virtue of this continued deputation. Some OIGs employ no criminal investigators and rely solely on administrative investigators, auditors, and inspectors.

== Lists of inspectors general ==
=== Presidentially-appointed, Senate-confirmed (PAS) inspectors general ===
==== Establishment inspectors general ====
Jurisdiction	Officeholder	Term start	Website
Agency for International Development (AID-OIG)	Marc Meyer (acting)	February 11, 2025	AID-OIG
Department of Agriculture (USDA-OIG)	John Walk	January 5, 2026	USDA-OIG
Central Intelligence Agency (CIA-OIG)	Peter Thomson	September 19, 2025	CIA-OIG
Department of Commerce (DOC-OIG)	Duane Townsend (acting)	July 7, 2025	DOC-OIG
Corporation for National and Community Service (AmeriCorps)	Michael Pritchard (acting)	July 2026	AmeriCorps OIG
Department of Defense (DOD-OIG)	Platte Moring	December 22, 2025	DOD-OIG
Department of Education (ED-OIG)	René L. Rocque (acting)	September 17, 2026	DOED-OIG
Department of Energy (DOE-OIG)	Sarah Nelson (acting)	January 24, 2025	DOE-OIG
Environmental Protection Agency and Chemical Safety and Hazard Investigation Board (EPA-OIG)	Nicole Murley (acting)	January 24, 2025	EPA-OIG
Export-Import Bank (EIB-OIG)	Jonathon Walz (acting)	October 15, 2025	EIB-OIG
Federal Communications Commission (FCC-OIG)	Fara Damelin	March 25, 2024	FCC-OIG
Federal Deposit Insurance Corporation (FDIC-OIG)	Jennifer L. Fain	December 22, 2023	FDIC-OIG
Federal Housing Finance Agency (FHFA-OIG)	John Allen (acting)	April 27, 2025	FHFA-OIG
General Services Administration (GSA-OIG)	Robert C. Erickson Jr. (acting)	July 1, 2023	GSA-OIG
Department of Health and Human Services (HHS-OIG)	Thomas March Bell	December 22, 2025	HHS-OIG
Department of Homeland Security (DHS-OIG)	Joseph Cuffari	July 25, 2019	DHS-OIG
Department of Housing and Urban Development (HUD-OIG)	Brian Harrison (acting)	August 14, 2025	HUD-OIG
Intelligence Community (ICIG)	Christopher Fox	October 16, 2025	ICIG
Department of the Interior (DOI-OIG)	Caryl Brzymialkiewicz (acting)	January 24, 2025	DOI-OIG
Internal Revenue Service (TIGTA)	Heather M. Hill (acting)	January 1, 2024	TIGTA
Department of Justice (DOJ-OIG)	Don R. Berthiaume	August 14, 2026	DOJ-OIG
Department of Labor (DOL-OIG)	Anthony D'Esposito	January 5, 2026	DOL-OIG
National Aeronautics and Space Administration (NASA-OIG)	Kathryn D. Sheehey (acting)	September 28, 2026	NASA-OIG
National Reconnaissance Office (NRO-OIG)	Terrence Edwards	December 23, 2022	NRO-OIG
National Security Agency and Central Security Service (NSA-OIG)	Kevin Gerrity (acting)	December 14, 2022	NSA-OIG
Nuclear Regulatory Commission (NRC-OIG)	Robert Feitel	May 27, 2020	NRC-OIG
Office of Personnel Management (OPM-OIG)	Norbert Vint (acting)	January 24, 2025	OPM-OIG
Railroad Retirement Board (RRB-OIG)	Shanon Holman (acting)	2024	RRB-OIG
Small Business Administration (SBA-OIG)	William Kirk	January 6, 2026	SBA-OIG
Social Security Administration (SSA-OIG)	Michelle L. Anderson (acting)	January 24, 2025	SSA-OIG
Department of State and the Agency for Global Media (DOS-OIG)	Arne B. Baker (acting)	May 1, 2025	DOS-OIG
Tennessee Valley Authority (TVA-OIG)	Ben Wagner	June 6, 2022	TVA-OIG
Department of Transportation and National Transportation Safety Board (DOT-OIG)	Mitch Behm (acting)	January 24, 2025	DOT-OIG
Department of the Treasury (Treasury OIG)	Loren Sciurba (acting)	January 3, 2025	Treasury OIG
Department of Veterans Affairs (VA-OIG)	Cheryl L. Mason	August 4, 2025	VA-OIG

==== Vacancies and pending nominations ====
Announced nominations for unfilled PAS IGs awaiting confirmation in the Senate.

Jurisdiction	Last confirmed	Vacancy date	Nominee	Nomination date
Department of the Treasury	Eric Thorson	June 30, 2019		
National Security Agency and Central Security Service	Robert Storch	December 6, 2022		
Corporation for National and Community Service	Deborah Jeffrey	May 7, 2023		
General Services Administration	Carol F. Ochoa	July 1, 2023	Maria D'Avanzo	July 14, 2026
Internal Revenue Service	J. Russell George	January 1, 2024		
National Aeronautics and Space Administration	Paul K. Martin	January 2, 2024	Robert Steinau	September 28, 2026
Department of Commerce	Peg Gustafson	January 5, 2024		
Railroad Retirement Board	Martin Dickman	April 28, 2024		
Social Security Administration	Gail Ennis	June 29, 2024		
Department of Education	Sandra Bruce	January 24, 2025	Mark Priebe	September 28, 2026
Department of Energy	Teri Donaldson	January 24, 2025		
Environmental Protection Agency	Sean O'Donnell	January 24, 2025		
Department of Housing and Urban Development	Rae Oliver Davis	January 24, 2025	Jeffrey Ledbetter	April 27, 2026
Department of the Interior	Mark Greenblatt	January 24, 2025	Dennis Kirk	August 7, 2026
Office of Personnel Management	Krista Boyd	January 24, 2025		
Department of State	Cardell Richardson	January 24, 2025	Carl Anderson	June 1, 2026
Department of Transportation	Eric Soskin	January 24, 2025		
Agency for International Development	Paul K. Martin	February 11, 2025		
Federal Housing Finance Agency	Brian Tomney	April 27, 2025		
Export-Import Bank	Parisa Salehi	October 15, 2025		

==== List of presidentially-appointed inspectors general ====
PAS IG History

Afghanistan Reconstruction (Special)

Officeholder	Term start
Arnold Fields	June 12, 2008
Herbert Richardson (acting)	February 5, 2011
John Sopko	July 2, 2012
Gene Aloise (acting)	January 24, 2025

Agency for International Development

Officeholder	Term start
Herbert Beckington	September 1, 1977
Jeffrey Rush	August 26, 1994
Everett Mosley	August 2, 1999; Acting: August 2, 1999 – December 15, 2000
James Ebbitt (acting)	September 4, 2004
Bruce Crandlemire (acting)	March 4, 2005
Paula Hayes (acting)	October 4, 2005
Donald Gambatesa	January 17, 2006
Michael Carroll (acting)	October 16, 2011
Catherine Trujillo (acting)	January 1, 2015
Ann Calvaresi Barr	November 30, 2015
Thomas J. Ullom (acting)	January 1, 2021
Nicole Angarella (acting)	March 28, 2022
Paul K. Martin	January 2, 2024
Marc Meyer (acting)	February 11, 2025

Department of Agriculture

Officeholder	Term start
Lester Condon	July 19, 1962
Nathaniel Kossack	May 1969
Position abolished	January 9, 1974
Thomas McBride	October 25, 1977
Robert Magee (Acting)	January 27, 1981
John Graziano	July 31, 1981
Robert Beuley	August 11, 1986
Leon Snead	December 26, 1988; Acting: December 26, 1988 – August 1, 1990
Charles Gillum (Acting)	January 1993
Roger Viadero	October 14, 1994
Joyce Fleischman (Acting)	October 3, 2001
Phyllis Fong	December 2, 2002
Janet Sorensen (acting)	February 1, 2025
John Walk	January 5, 2026

Central Intelligence Agency

Officeholder	Term start
John Waller	July 1976
Charles Briggs	January 1980
James Taylor	September 1982
John Stein	July 1984
Carroll Hauver	December 23, 1985
William Donnelly	January 18, 1988; Acting: January 18, 1988 – December 1, 1989
Frederick Hitz	November 13, 1990
Dawn Ellison (acting)	May 1, 1998
Britt Snider	August 3, 1998
Rebecca Donegan (acting)	January 22, 2001
George Clarke (acting)	January 14, 2002
John Helgerson	April 26, 2002
Patricia Lewis (acting)	March 21, 2009
David Buckley	October 6, 2010
Christopher Sharpley (acting)	February 1, 2015
Christine Ruppert (acting)	August 2018
Robin Ashton	June 28, 2021
Robert Host (acting)	December 31, 2024
Peter Thomson	September 2025

Department of Commerce

Officeholder	Term start
Guy Chamberlin (Acting)	October 1, 1978
Mary Bass	July 9, 1979
Frederic Heim (Acting)	January 21, 1981
Sherman Funk	October 2, 1981
Frank DeGeorge	April 21, 1987; Acting: April 21, 1987 – April 18, 1988
Johnnie Frazier	January 7, 1998; Acting: January 7, 1998 – July 20, 1999
Elizabeth Barlow (acting)	June 7, 2007
Todd Zinser	December 26, 2007
Morgan Kim (acting)	June 4, 2015
Peg Gustafson	January 9, 2017
Roderick Anderson (acting)	January 5, 2024
Jill Baisinger (acting)	May 31, 2024
Roderick Anderson (acting)	January 24, 2025

Corporation for National and Community Service

Officeholder	Term start
Judith Denny (Acting)	April 4, 1994
Luise Jordan	October 6, 1994
Terry Bathen (Acting)	February 24, 2002
Russell George	July 29, 2002
Carol Bates (Acting)	December 12, 2004
Gerald Walpin	January 8, 2007
Kenneth Bach (Acting)	July 12, 2009
Deborah Jeffrey	July 19, 2012
Stephen Ravas (Acting)	May 7, 2023

Department of Defense

Officeholder	Term start
Joseph Sherick	April 20, 1981; On leave: June 1985 – June 3, 1986
Derek Vander Schaaf (Acting)	June 1985
June Gibbs Brown	November 13, 1987
Derek Vander Schaaf (Acting)	October 20, 1989
Susan Crawford	November 28, 1989
Derek Vander Schaaf (Acting)	November 19, 1991
Eleanor Hill	March 1, 1995
Donald Manusco (Acting)	May 3, 1999
Robert Lieberman (Acting)	January 4, 2001
Joe Schmitz	April 2, 2002
Thomas Gimble (Acting)	September 12, 2005
Mick Kicklighter	April 30, 2007
Gordon Heddell	July 14, 2008; Acting: July 14, 2008 – July 14, 2009
Lynne Halbrooks (Acting)	December 25, 2011
Jon Rymer	September 17, 2013
Glenn Fine (Acting)	January 14, 2016
Sean O'Donnell (Acting)	April 6, 2020
Robert Storch	December 14, 2022
Steven Stebbins (acting)	January 24, 2025
Platte Moring	December 22, 2025

Department of Education

Officeholder	Term start
John Yazurlo (Acting)	May 4, 1980
James Thomas	August 26, 1980
John Yazurlo (Acting)	January 27, 1981
James Thomas	July 27, 1981
Gretchen Schwarz (Acting)	March 4, 1995
John Higgins (Acting)	April 3, 1995
Thomas Bloom	January 3, 1996
Steve McNamara (Acting)	January 1, 1998
John Higgins (Acting)	March 1, 1998
Lorraine Pratte Lewis	June 14, 1999
John Higgins	May 27, 2002; Acting: May 27, 2002 – November 27, 2002
Mary Mitchelson (Acting)	July 1, 2008
Kathleen Tighe	March 17, 2010
Sandra Bruce	December 3, 2018; Acting: December 3, 2018 – December 2, 2021
René Rocque (acting)	January 24, 2025

Department of Energy

Officeholder	Term start
Joseph Seltzer (Acting)	October 1, 1977
Kenneth Mansfield	May 24, 1978
James Wright (Acting)	January 22, 1981
James Richards	September 23, 1981
John Layton	January 6, 1986
Gregory Friedman	January 5, 1998; Acting: January 5, 1998 – October 21, 1998
Rickey Hass (Acting)	October 3, 2015
April Stephenson (Acting)	January 2019
Teri Donaldson	January 23, 2019
Sarah Nelson (acting)	January 24, 2025

Environmental Protection Agency

Officeholder	Term start
Malcolm Stringer (Acting)	November 1, 1978
Inez Smith Reid	December 9, 1979
Ernest Bradley (Acting)	January 25, 1981
Matthew Novick	October 14, 1981
Charles Dempsey (Acting)	February 24, 1983
Donald Kirkendall (Acting)	June 13, 1983
John Martin	October 27, 1983
Nikki Tinsley	January 4, 1997; Acting: January 4, 1997 – November 9, 1998
Bill Roderick (Acting)	March 6, 2006
Arthur Elkins	June 25, 2010
Chuck Sheehan (Acting)	October 12, 2018
Sean O'Donnell	January 27, 2020
Nicole Murley (acting)	January 24, 2025

Export-Import Bank

Officeholder	Term start
Michael Tankersley	August 6, 2007
Osvaldo Gratacós	October 31, 2009; Acting: October 31, 2009 – October 15, 2010
Mike McCarthy (Acting)	June 27, 2014
Terry Settle (Acting)	September 2017
Parisa Salehi (Acting)	August 2018
Jennifer Fain (Acting)	August 3, 2019
Parisa Salehi	March 14, 2022
Jonathon Walz (Acting)	October 15, 2025

Federal Communications Commission

Officeholder	Term start
John Kamp (Acting)	April 13, 1989
James Warwick	October 23, 1989; Acting: October 23, 1989 – June 13, 1991
Walker Feaster	November 13, 1994; Acting: November 13, 1994 – April 14, 1996
Kent Nilsson	January 6, 2006; Acting: January 6, 2006 – May 28, 2006
David Hunt	June 5, 2009; Acting: June 5, 2009 – January 10, 2011
Sharon Diskin (Acting)	January 10, 2023
Fara Damelin	March 25, 2024

Federal Deposit Insurance Corporation

Officeholder	Term start
James Renick (Acting)	March 8, 1993
Gaston Gianni	April 29, 1996
Patricia Black (Acting)	January 1, 2005
Jon Rymer	June 22, 2006
Fred Gibson (Acting)	September 17, 2013
Jay Lerner	January 9, 2017
Tyler Smith (Acting)	January 27, 2023
Jennifer L. Fain	December 22, 2023

Federal Emergency Management Agency

Officeholder	Term start
Russell Miller	August 4, 1990
William Partridge (Acting)	May 1, 1994
George Opfer	November 7, 1994
Richard Skinner (Acting)	November 30, 2002

Federal Housing Finance Agency

Officeholder	Term start
Steve Linick	September 29, 2010
Michael Stephens (Acting)	September 30, 2013
Laura Wertheimer	October 28, 2014
Phyllis Fong (Acting)	August 2, 2021
Brian Tomney	March 14, 2022
John Allen (acting)	April 27, 2025

General Services Administration

Officeholder	Term start
Kurt Muellenberg	April 11, 1979
Michael Eberhardt (Acting)	January 21, 1981
Brian Bruh (Acting)	March 3, 1981
Joseph Sickon	August 5, 1981
Charles Gillum (Acting)	August 5, 1984
William Barton	November 19, 1985
Joel Gallay (Acting)	June 4, 2001
Daniel Levinson	August 9, 2001
Joel Gallay (Acting)	June 9, 2005
Brian Miller	August 9, 2005
Robert Erickson (Acting)	May 1, 2014
Carol Fortine Ochoa	July 29, 2015
Robert Erickson (Acting)	July 1, 2023

Department of Health and Human Services

Officeholder	Term start
Thomas Morris	February 19, 1977
Richard Lowe (Acting)	September 1, 1979
Brian Mitchell (Acting)	January 1, 1981
Richard Kusserow	June 1, 1981
Brian Mitchell (Acting)	July 1, 1992
June Gibbs Brown	November 5, 1993
Michael Mangano (Acting)	January 4, 2001
Janet Rehnquist	August 8, 2001
Dara Corrigan (Acting)	June 2, 2003
Daniel Levinson	September 13, 2004; Acting: September 13, 2004 – June 9, 2005
Joanne Chiedi (Acting)	May 31, 2019
Christi Grimm	December 27, 2019; Acting: December 27, 2019 – February 22, 2022
Juliet Hodgkins (acting)	January 24, 2025
Thomas Bell	December 22, 2025

Department of Homeland Security

Officeholder	Term start
Clark Ervin	January 24, 2003; Acting: January 24, 2003 – December 26, 2003
Richard Skinner	December 8, 2004; Acting: December 8, 2004 – July 28, 2005
Charles Edwards (Acting)	February 27, 2011
Carlton Mann (Acting)	December 17, 2014
John Roth	March 10, 2014
John Kelly (Acting)	December 1, 2017
Jennifer Costello (Acting)	June 10, 2019
Joseph Cuffari	July 25, 2019

Department of Housing and Urban Development

Officeholder	Term start
Charles Haynes	January 31, 1972
Charles Dempsey	May 24, 1975
James Thomas	August 31, 1975
Charles Dempsey	October 1, 1977
Paul Adams (Acting)	January 21, 1981
Charles Dempsey	August 5, 1981
Paul Adams (Acting)	February 25, 1983
Charles Dempsey	June 14, 1983
Paul Adams (Acting)	February 4, 1985
John Connors (Acting)	March 1, 1992
Susan Gaffney	August 6, 1993
James Heist (Acting)	June 4, 2001
David Williams (Acting)	July 16, 2001
Kenneth Donohue	May 20, 2002
Michael Stephens (Acting)	October 2010
David Montoya	December 1, 2011
Helen Albert (Acting)	July 2017
Rae Oliver Davis	January 23, 2019
Stephen Bagg (acting)	January 24, 2025

Intelligence Community

Officeholder	Term start
Charles McCullough	November 7, 2011
Michael Atkinson	May 17, 2018; On leave: April 3, 2020 – May 3, 2020
Thomas Monheim	April 3, 2020; Acting: April 3, 2020 – October 4, 2021
Tamara Johnson (Acting)	January 3, 2025
Christopher Fox	October 2025

Department of the Interior

Officeholder	Term start
William Kendig (Acting)	October 17, 1978
June Brown	May 10, 1979
Richard Mulberry	July 14, 1981
Robert Beuley (Acting)	October 1, 1981
Arthur Dellinger (Acting)	October 26, 1984
Robert Beuley (Acting)	May 2, 1985
Thomas Sheehan (Acting)	September 8, 1985
James Richards	January 6, 1986
Joyce Fleischman (Acting)	April 1, 1993
Wilma Lewis	April 10, 1995
Robert Williams (Acting)	January 8, 1998
Richard Reback (Acting)	July 1, 1998
Eljay Bowron	November 2, 1998
Robert Williams (Acting)	March 29, 1999
Earl Devaney	August 5, 1999; On leave: February 23, 2009 – December 31, 2011
Mary Kendall (Acting)	February 23, 2009
Mark Greenblatt	August 26, 2019
Caryl Brzymialkiewicz (acting)	January 24, 2025

Internal Revenue Service

Officeholder	Term start
Lawrence Rogers (Acting)	January 18, 1999
David Williams	May 17, 1999
Pamela Gardiner (Acting)	August 24, 2002
Russell George	December 12, 2004
Heather M. Hill (Acting)	January 1, 2024

Department of Justice

Officeholder	Term start
Anthony Moscato (Acting)	April 14, 1989
Richard Hankinson	June 25, 1990
Michael Bromwich	June 9, 1994
Robert Ashbaugh (Acting)	August 16, 1999
Glenn Fine	August 10, 2000; Acting: August 10, 2000 – December 15, 2000
Cynthia Schnedar (Acting)	January 29, 2011
Michael Horowitz	April 16, 2012
William Blier (Acting)	June 30, 2025
Don R. Berthiaume	August 14, 2026

Department of Labor

Officeholder	Term start
Rocco De Marco (Acting)	October 23, 1978
Marjorie Fine Knowles	May 18, 1979
Ronald Goldstock (Acting)	May 2, 1980
Frank Yeager (Acting)	February 1, 1981
Thomas McBride	July 18, 1981
Robert McGee (Acting)	October 16, 1982
Brian Hyland	March 23, 1983; Acting: March 23, 1983 – August 4, 1983
Raymond Maria (Acting)	September 3, 1989
Julian De La Rosa	August 6, 1990
Charles Masten	March 20, 1993; Acting: March 20, 1993 – November 20, 1993
Patricia Dalton (Acting)	January 3, 2000
Gordon Heddell	January 2, 2001
Daniel Petrole (Acting)	July 15, 2008
Scott Dahl	October 16, 2013
Larry Turner	June 21, 2020; Acting: June 21, 2020 – December 7, 2021
Luiz A. Santos (acting)	January 24, 2025
Anthony D'Esposito	January 6, 2026

National Aeronautics and Space Administration

Officeholder	Term start
Robert Allnut (Acting)	October 1, 1978
Eldon Taylor	August 1, 1979
Brian Hyland (Acting)	December 1, 1980
June Gibbs Brown	June 14, 1981
Bill Colvin	October 17, 1985
Lewis Rinker (Acting)	September 4, 1994
Roberta Gross	August 15, 1995
Frank LaRocca (Acting)	March 3, 2002
Robert Cobb	April 22, 2002
Thomas Howard (Acting)	April 11, 2009
Paul Martin	November 20, 2009
George Scott (Acting)	January 2, 2024
Robert Steinau (Acting)	December 2024

National Reconnaissance Office

Officeholder	Term start
Susan Gibson	September 26, 2016
Terrence Edwards	December 23, 2022

National Security Agency

Officeholder	Term start
Russell Decker (Acting)	December 2016
Robert Storch	January 11, 2018
Kevin Gerrity (Acting)	January 11, 2018

Nuclear Regulatory Commission

Officeholder	Term start
David Williams	November 22, 1989
Leo Norton (Acting)	September 1, 1995
Hubert Bell	July 8, 1996
David Lee (Acting)	December 31, 2018
Robert Feitel	May 27, 2020

Pandemic Recovery (Special)

Officeholder	Term start
Brian Miller	June 5, 2020

Office of Personnel Management

Officeholder	Term start
Patrick Conklin	March 1, 1987
Joseph Willever (Acting)	April 16, 1989
Patrick McFarland	August 9, 1990
Norbert Vint (Acting)	February 19, 2016
Krista Boyd	April 28, 2022
Norbert Vint (acting)	January 24, 2025

Railroad Retirement Board

Officeholder	Term start
William Doyle	January 14, 1986
Charles Sekerak (Acting)	April 8, 1994
Martin Dickman	October 14, 1994
Ben Wagner (Acting)	April 28, 2024
Shanon Holman (Acting)	2024

Resolution Trust Corporation

Officeholder	Term start
John Adair	April 1, 1990

Small Business Administration

Officeholder	Term start
Raymond Randolph (Acting)	October 12, 1978
Paul Boucher	July 1, 1979
Raymond Randolph (Acting)	January 21, 1981
Paul Boucher	July 21, 1981
Raymond Randolph (Acting)	July 5, 1982
Mary Wieseman	May 10, 1983
Raymond Randolph (Acting)	September 7, 1986
Charles Gillum	April 7, 1987
Daniel Peyser (Acting)	August 19, 1990
James Hoobler	April 18, 1991
Karen Lee (Acting)	December 1, 1997
Phyllis Fong	April 6, 1999
Peter McClintock (Acting)	December 2, 2002
Harold Damelin	April 21, 2003
Peter McClintock (Acting)	April 4, 2005
Eric Thorson	April 2006
Peter McClintock (Acting)	August 12, 2008
Peg Gustafson	October 2, 2009
Mike Ware	January 9, 2017; Acting: January 9, 2017 – May 24, 2018
Sheldon Shoemaker (acting)	January 24, 2025
William Kirk	January 6, 2026

Social Security Administration

Officeholder	Term start
June Gibbs Brown	March 31, 1995
David Williams	January 4, 1996
James Huse	June 22, 1998
Patrick O'Carroll	March 7, 2004; Acting: March 7, 2004 – November 29, 2004
Gale Stallworth Stone (Acting)	May 29, 2016
Gail Ennis	January 29, 2019
Michelle Anderson (Acting)	June 29, 2024
Mike Ware (Acting)	September 30, 2024
Michelle L. Anderson (acting)	January 24, 2025

Department of State

Officeholder	Term start
Raymond Miller	March 1, 1954 – October 31, 1960
Gerald Drew	November 13, 1960 – May 31, 1962
Norris Haselton	June 10, 1962 – July 31, 1964
Fraser Wilkins	July 23, 1964 – August 8, 1971
Thomas McElhiney	July 1, 1971 – July 18, 1973
Jim Sutterlin	October 15, 1973
Robert Yost (Acting)	September 1, 1974
William Schaufele	August 22, 1975
Robert Sayre	November 24, 1975
Brandon Grove (Acting)	May 1, 1978
Ted Eliot	July 5, 1978 – October 16, 1978
Robert Brewster	January 14, 1979 – January 21, 1981
Robert Brown	January 21, 1981 – June 30, 1983; Acting: January 21, 1981 – July 7, 1981
William Harrop	December 12, 1983; Acting: November 15, 1983 – August 16, 1985
Bryon Hollingsworth (Acting)	August 27, 1986
Sherman Funk	August 14, 1987
Rocky Suddarth (Acting)	February 15, 1994
Harold Geisel (Acting)	June 12, 1994
Jacquelyn Williams-Bridgers	April 7, 1995
Anne Sigmund (Acting)	February 4, 2001
Clark Ervin	August 3, 2001
Anne Sigmund (Acting)	January 24, 2003
Anne Patterson (Acting)	September 28, 2003
John Lange (Acting)	August 3, 2004
Cameron Hume (Acting)	August 23, 2004
Howard Krongard	May 2, 2005
Harold Geisel (Acting)	January 16, 2008
Steve Linick	September 30, 2013; On leave: May 15, 2020 – June 14, 2020
Stephen Akard (Acting)	May 15, 2020
Diana Shaw (Acting)	August 7, 2020
Matthew Klimow (Acting)	August 31, 2020
Diana Shaw (Acting)	December 11, 2020
Sandra Lewis (Acting)	April 5, 2024
Cardell K. Richardson Sr.	May 20, 2024
Arne B. Baker (acting)	January 24, 2025

Tennessee Valley Authority

Officeholder	Term start
Richard Chambers (Acting)	December 1, 2000
Donald Hickman (Acting)	January 26, 2002
Richard Moore	May 9, 2003
Jill Matthews (Acting)	September 21, 2017
Ben Wagner	June 6, 2022

Department of Transportation

Officeholder	Term start
Frenk Sato	May 10, 1979
Joseph Genovese (Acting)	January 22, 1981
Joseph Welsch	July 18, 1981
Joseph Genovese (Acting)	January 1, 1986
John Melchner	October 12, 1986
Raymond DeCarli (Acting)	January 1, 1990
Mary Schiavo	October 31, 1990
Mario Lauro (Acting)	July 8, 1996
Joyce Fleischman (Acting)	August 12, 1996
Kenneth Mead	May 29, 1997
Todd Zinser (Acting)	February 11, 2006
Calvin Scovel	October 27, 2006
Mitch Behm (Acting)	February 1, 2020
Skip Elliott (Acting)	May 16, 2020
Eric J. Soskin	January 11, 2021
Mitch Behm (acting)	January 24, 2025

Department of the Treasury

Officeholder	Term start
Leon Wigrizer	August 18, 1978
Eugene Essner (Acting)	February 1, 1981
Paul Trause	August 12, 1981
Emily Marwell (Acting)	February 26, 1984
John Layton	September 9, 1984
Michael Hill	April 6, 1986; Acting: April 6, 1986 – April 16, 1989
Robert Cesca (Acting)	June 1, 1989
Donald Kirkendall	November 22, 1989
Robert Cesca (Acting)	January 21, 1993
Valerie Lau	October 11, 1994
Richard Calahan (Acting)	February 9, 1998
David Williams	October 26, 1998
Lawrence Rogers (Acting)	May 17, 1999
Jeffrey Rush	July 30, 1999
Dennis Schindel (Acting)	April 3, 2004
Harold Damelin	April 4, 2005
Dennis Schindel (Acting)	April 30, 2007
Eric Thorson	August 12, 2008
Rich Delmar (Acting)	June 30, 2019
Loren Sciurba (Acting)	January 3, 2025

Troubled Asset Relief Program (Special)

Officeholder	Term start
Neil Barofsky	December 8, 2008
Christy Romero	April 1, 2011; Acting: April 1, 2011 – February 1, 2012
Melissa Bruce (Acting)	March 30, 2022

U.S. Information Agency

Officeholder	Term start
Anthony Gabriel	July 2, 1987
George Murphy	August 6, 1990
Terence Shea (Acting)	May 1, 1993
Marian Bennet	November 28, 1993

Department of Veterans Affairs

Officeholder	Term start
John Williams (Acting)	November 9, 1977
Allan Reynolds	May 1, 1979
Morris Silverstein (Acting)	January 21, 1981
Frank Sato	July 31, 1981
Renald Morani	January 1, 1988
Stephen Trodden	August 4, 1990
William Merriman (Acting)	January 3, 1996
Richard Griffin	November 11, 1997
Jon Wooditch (Acting)	June 22, 2005
George Opfer	November 17, 2005
Richard Griffin (Acting)	January 1, 2014
Linda Halliday (Acting)	July 6, 2015
Michael Missal	May 2, 2016
David Case (acting)	January 24, 2025
Cheryl L. Mason	August 4, 2025

=== Designated federal entity (DFE) inspectors general ===
Jurisdiction	Officeholder	Term start	Website
Appalachian Regional Commission (ARC-OIG)	Clayton Fox	2023/24	ARC-OIG
Committee for Purchase from People Who Are Blind or Severely Disabled (CPPBSD-OIG)	Stefania Pozzi Porter	July 15, 2021; Acting: July 15, 2021 – October 13, 2022	CPPBSD-OIG
Commodity Futures Trading Commission (CFTC-OIG)	Christopher Skinner	April 10, 2024	CFTC-OIG
Consumer Product Safety Commission (CPSC-OIG)	Christopher Dentel	January 9, 2003; Acting: January 9, 2003 – January 10, 2004	CPSC-OIG
Corporation for Public Broadcasting (CPB-OIG)	Kimberly Howell	October 7, 2019	CPB-OIG
Defense Intelligence Agency (DIA-OIG)	Jeremy Kirkland	January 27, 2023 Acting: January 27, 2023 - June 3, 2023	DIA-OIG
Denali Commission (DC-OIG)	Roderick Fillinger	January 19, 2020	Denali OIG
Election Assistance Commission (EAC-OIG)	Sarah Dreyer (acting)	April 2024	EAC-OIG
Equal Employment Opportunity Commission (EEOC-OIG)	Joyce Willoughby	July 3, 2022Acting: July 3, 2022 - March 12, 2023	EEOC-OIG
Farm Credit Administration (FCA-OIG)	Nick Novak (acting)	October 2024	FCA-OIG
Federal Election Commission (FEC-OIG)	Susan Ruge-Hudson	October 21, 2024	FEC-OIG
Federal Labor Relations Authority (FLRA-OIG)	Dana Rooney	August 30, 2010	FLRA-OIG
Federal Maritime Commission (FMC-OIG)	Jon Hatfield	August 12, 2013; Acting: August 12, 2013 – May 18, 2014	FMC-OIG
Federal Reserve Board and Consumer Financial Protection Bureau (FRB-OIG)	Michael E. Horowitz	June 30, 2025	FRB-OIG
Federal Trade Commission (FTC-OIG)	Marissa Gould (acting)	December 2024	FTC-OIG
International Development Finance Corporation (DFC-OIG)	Anthony Zakel	August 20, 2020	DFC-OIG
International Trade Commission (USITC-OIG)	Rashmi Bartlett	July 6, 2021	USITC-OIG
Legal Services Corporation (LSC-OIG)	Thomas Yatsco	April 25, 2023	LSC-OIG
National Archives and Records Administration (NARA-OIG)	Brett Baker	April 19, 2021; Acting: April 19, 2021 – July 23, 2021	NARA-OIG
National Credit Union Administration (NCUA-OIG)	Jim Hagen	June 1, 2013	NCUA-OIG
National Endowment for the Arts (NEA-OIG)	Ron Stith	June 13, 2016	NEA-OIG
National Endowment for the Humanities (NEH-OIG)	Laura Davis	January 30, 2011; Acting: January 30, 2011 – December 17, 2012	NEH-OIG
National Geospatial-Intelligence Agency (NGA-OIG)	Michael Boehman	August 2024	NGA-OIG
National Labor Relations Board (NLRB-OIG)	Ruth Blevins	October 28, 2024	NLRB-OIG
National Railroad Passenger Corporation	Kevin Winters	February 1, 2019	Amtrak OIG
National Science Foundation (NSF-OIG)	Allison Lerner	April 27, 2009	NSF-OIG
Peace Corps (PC-OIG)	Joaquin E. Ferrao	January 1, 2022Acting: January 1, 2022 - April 25, 2023	PC-OIG
Pension Benefit Guaranty Corporation (PBGC-OIG)	Nicholas Novak	April 27, 2020 Acting: April 27, 2020 – February 17, 2021	PBGC-OIG
Postal Service and Postal Regulatory Commission (USPS-OIG)	Tammy Whitcomb Hull	February 19, 2016; Acting: February 19, 2016 – November 29, 2018	USPS-OIG
Securities and Exchange Commission (SEC-OIG)	Deborah Jeffrey	May 7, 2023	SEC-OIG
Smithsonian Institution (SI-OIG)	Nicole Angarella	May 20, 2024	SI-OIG

==== List of DFE IGs ====
DFE IG History

Appalachian Regional Commission

Officeholder	Term start
Hubert Sparks	October 2, 1989
Clifford Jennings	April 8, 2002
Hubert Sparks	April 18, 2011
Philip Heneghan	February 19, 2020
Clayton Fox	2023/24

Architect of the Capitol

Officeholder	Term start
Carol Bates	August 18, 2008
Kevin Mulshine	September 8, 2013
Thomas Lehrich (Acting)	December 2016
Christopher Failla	April 17, 2017

Capitol Police

Officeholder	Term start
Carl Hoecker	July 10, 2006
Fay Ropella	February 11, 2013; Acting: February 11, 2013 – August 11, 2013
Michael Bolton	March 30, 2018; Acting: March 30, 2018 – January 20, 2019

Committee for Purchase from People Who Are Blind or Severely Disabled

Officeholder	Term start
Thomas Lehrich	May 2017

Commodity Futures Trading Commission

Officeholder	Term start
Nancy Wentzler	September 24, 1989
Donald Smith (Acting)	June 17, 1990
Roy Lavik	October 7, 1990
Brett Baker (acting)	May 17, 2023
Christopher Skinner	April 10, 2024

Consumer Product Safety Commission

Officeholder	Term start
Thomas Stein	April 7, 1989; Acting: April 7, 1989 – January 19, 1990
Mary Wyles	August 2, 1998; Acting: August 2, 1998 – February 7, 1999
Christopher Dentel	January 9, 2003; Acting: January 9, 2003 – January 10, 2004

Corporation for Public Broadcasting

Officeholder	Term start
Lester Latney	April 17, 1989
Joe Arvizu	February 16, 1997
Frederick Lau (Acting)	May 26, 1998
Kenneth Konz	November 9, 1998
Mary Mitchelson	June 3, 2013
William Richardson (Acting)	April 26, 2019
Kimberly Howell	October 7, 2019

Denali Commission

Officeholder	Term start
Michael Marsh	December 22, 2006
David Sheppard (Acting)	May 28, 2014
Roderick Fillinger	2014

Election Assistance Commission

Officeholder	Term start
Roger LaRouche (Acting)	August 9, 2005
Curtis Crider	August 24, 2006
Roger LaRouche (Acting)	September 30, 2015
Patricia Layfield	February 22, 2016
Brianna Schletz	October 14, 2021
Sarah Dreyer (Acting)	April 2024

Equal Employment Opportunity Commission

Officeholder	Term start
William Miller	January 4, 1989
Aletha Brown	February 6, 1995; Acting: February 6, 1995 – July 28, 1996
Milton Mayo	January 1, 2010; Acting: January 1, 2010 – June 22, 2011

Farm Credit Administration

Officeholder	Term start
Eldon Stoehr	January 22, 1989
Elizabeth Dean (Acting)	December 16, 2000
Stephen Smith	January 12, 2001
Elizabeth Dean (Acting)	June 16, 2005
Carl Clinefelter	July 10, 2005
Elizabeth Dean	January 4, 2013; Acting: January 4, 2013 – June 19, 2013
Wendy Laguarda	August 1, 2017
Nick Novak (Acting)	October 2024

Federal Election Commission

Officeholder	Term start
Craig Crooks (Acting)	April 17, 1989
Lynne McFarland	February 11, 1990
Cameron Thurber (Acting)	March 1, 2017
Vacant	November 9, 2018
Tony Baptiste (Acting)	May 22, 2019
Christopher Skinner	August 5, 2019
Michael Mitchell (Acting)	April 2024
Susan Ruge-Hudson	October 21, 2024

Federal Labor Relations Authority

Officeholder	Term start
Paul Miller	September 24, 1989
John Zielinski (Acting)	April 15, 1994
William Tobey (Acting)	April 30, 1994
John Suszko (Acting)	May 23, 1994
William Tobey (Acting)	October 30, 1994
Robert Andary	May 7, 1995
William Tobey (Acting)	July 20, 1997
Francine Eichler	February 22, 1998
Charlie Center (Acting)	January 3, 2010
Dana Rooney	August 30, 2010

Federal Maritime Commission

Officeholder	Term start
Tony Kominoth	February 26, 1989
Bridgette Hicks (Acting)	March 3, 2005
Adam Trzeciak	April 16, 2006
Dana Rooney (Acting)	January 22, 2013
Jon Hatfield	August 12, 2013; Acting: August 12, 2013 – May 18, 2014

Federal Reserve Board

Officeholder	Term start
Brent Bowen	July 20, 1987
Barry Snyder	June 1, 1998
Beth Coleman	May 6, 2007
Mark Bialek	July 25, 2011
Fred Gibson (Acting)	April 1, 2025
Michael E. Horowitz	June 30, 2025

Federal Trade Commission

Officeholder	Term start
Frederick Zirkel	June 6, 1989
Adam Trzeciak (Acting)	February 1, 2005
Howard Sribnick	May 30, 2005
John Seeba	January 7, 2008
Scott Wilson	August 13, 2012
Kelly Tshibaka (Acting)	June 1, 2014
Roslyn Mazer	March 29, 2015
Andrew Katsaros	June 8, 2018; Acting: June 8, 2018 – November 2018
Marissa Gould (Acting)	December 2024

Government Accountability Office

Officeholder	Term start
Francis Garcia	January 19, 1986
Cathy Helm (Acting)	December 29, 2012
Adam Trzeciak	January 13, 2013

Government Publishing Office

Officeholder	Term start
Joyce Blaylock	March 10, 1985
Victor Bouril (acting)	June 16, 1990
Lewis Small	May 7, 1995
Thomas Muldoon (acting)	January 6, 1997
Robert Andary	November 9, 1997
Andrew Killgore (acting)	February 7, 2003
Marc Nichols	March 17, 2003
Greg Brower	October 3, 2004
Anthony Ogden	October 1, 2006
Michael Raponi	November 21, 2011
Stephen Roy (acting)	April 2018
Melinda Miguel	July 12, 2018
James Ives (acting)	January 8, 2019
Mike Leary	April 24, 2019

House of Representatives

Officeholder	Term start
John Lainhart	November 14, 1993 – March 31, 1999
Steve McNamara	March 13, 2000 – May 30, 2005
James Cornell	March 2, 2006 – January 2, 2010
Terry Grafenstine	January 2, 2010 – September 2017; Acting: January 2, 2010 – July 30, 2010
Michael Ptasienski	September 2017 – present Acting: September 2017 – February 15, 2018

International Development Finance Corporation

Officeholder	Term start
TBD	

International Trade Commission

Officeholder	Term start
Jane Altenhofen	April 17, 1989
Dev Jagadesan (acting)	May 30, 1999
Kenneth Clark	July 15, 2001
Jean Smith (acting)	November 1, 2005
Vacant	March 12, 2006
Jean Smith (acting)	August 19, 2007
Vacant	December 20, 2007
Judith Gwynn (acting)	January 6, 2008
Antonio Baptiste (acting)	August 17, 2009
Philip Heneghan	December 6, 2009
Rhonda Turnbow (acting)	March 1, 2020
Rashmi Bartlett	July 6, 2021

Iraq Reconstruction (Special)

Officeholder	Term start
Stuart Bowen	January 20, 2004

Legal Services Corporation

Officeholder	Term start
David Wilkinson	September 5, 1989
Robert Holliday (Acting)	September 6, 1991
Edouard Quatrevaux	September 17, 1991
Leonard Koczur (Acting)	December 2, 2000
Kirt West	September 1, 2004
Dutch Merryman (Acting)	September 16, 2007
Jeffrey Schanz	March 3, 2008

Library of Congress

Officeholder	Term start
Karl Schornagel	March 12, 2001
Kurt Hyde	July 28, 2014
Glenda B. Arrington	June 20, 2023
Debbie Lehrich (Acting)	2023/24
Kimberly Benoit	November 2024

National Archives and Records Administration

Officeholder	Term start
Lawrence Oberg	April 16, 1989
Debra Guentzel (Acting)	November 9, 1992
Roberta Gross (Acting)	January 10, 1993
Floyd Justice	June 1, 1993
Robert Taylor (Acting)	July 23, 1995
Kelly Sisario	March 18, 1996
Ralph McNamara (Acting)	July 4, 1999
Paul Brachfeld	December 19, 1999
James Springs	September 12, 2012; Acting: September 12, 2012 – March 23, 2015
Brett Baker	April 19, 2021; Acting: April 19, 2021 - July 31, 2021

National Credit Union Administration

Officeholder	Term start
Joan Perry	March 23, 1989
Frank Thomas	September 8, 1992
William DeSarno (Acting)	July 8, 2002
Herbert Yolles	October 21, 2002
William DeSarno	April 1, 2005
Jim Hagen	June 1, 2013

National Endowment for the Arts

Officeholder	Term start
Leon Lilly	April 9, 1989
Edward Johns	October 15, 1995; Acting: October 15, 1995 – March 31, 1996
Daniel Shaw	January 14, 2001; Acting: January 14, 2001 – March 25, 2001
Tonie Jones	March 17, 2008
Michael Binder (Acting)	December 28, 2015
Ron Stith	June 13, 2016

National Endowment for the Humanities

Officeholder	Term start
Sheldon Bernstein	April 12, 1989
Laura Davis	January 30, 2011; Acting: January 30, 2011 – December 17, 2012

National Geospatial-Intelligence Agency

Officeholder	Term start
Cardell K. Richardson	December 2017
Michael Boehman	August 2024

National Labor Relations Board

Officeholder	Term start
Bernard Levine	November 7, 1989
John Higgins (Acting)	July 25, 1994
Robert Allen	September 23, 1996; Acting: September 23, 1996 – March 21, 1997
Aileen Armstrong	May 18, 1998
Jane Altenhofen	May 30, 1999
Vacant	December 21, 2007
David Berry	November 23, 2008
Kevin Thomas (Acting)	2024
Ruth Blevins	October 28, 2024

National Railroad Passenger Corporation

Officeholder	Term start
Fred Weiderhold	April 3, 1989
Lorraine Green (Acting)	June 17, 2009
Ted Alves	November 5, 2009
Tom Howard	February 4, 2014
Kevin Winters	February 1, 2019

National Science Foundation

Officeholder	Term start
Linda Sundro	April 30, 1989
Philip Sunshine (Acting)	April 12, 1998
Christine Boesz	January 18, 2000
Allison Lerner	April 27, 2009

Panama Canal Commission

Officeholder	Term start
John Mathis	April 16, 1989
Peter Liehr	December 15, 1989
William Forbes	January 4, 1997
Victor Diamond	January 4, 1998

Peace Corps

Officeholder	Term start
Gerard Roy	January 23, 1989
John Hale (Acting)	February 14, 1992
Michael Hill	May 31, 1992
Michael Tully (Acting)	February 9, 1993
Jeffrey Rush (Acting)	February 21, 1993
Deborah Holt Kirk	March 6, 1994
Charles Maddox	April 30, 1995; Acting: April 30, 1995 – January 3, 1996
Charles Smith	July 6, 1997; Acting: July 6, 1997 – August 2, 1998
David Kotz	January 6, 2006
Kathy Buller	May 25, 2008

Pension Benefit Guaranty Corporation

Officeholder	Term start
Wayne Poll	April 24, 1989
Deborah Stover-Springer (Acting)	June 1, 2002
Robert Emmons	January 16, 2003
Deborah Stover-Springer (Acting)	October 3, 2007
Rebecca Batts	April 30, 2008
Deborah Stover-Springer (Acting)	October 3, 2013
Bob Westbrooks	May 2015
Nicholas Novak (Acting)	April 27, 2020

Postal Regulatory Commission

Officeholder	Term start
Jack Callender	June 25, 2007

Postal Service

Officeholder	Term start
Charles Clauson	October 18, 1988
Kenneth Hunter	September 5, 1992
Karla Corcoran	January 4, 1997
David Williams	August 20, 2003
Tammy Whitcomb Hull	February 19, 2016; Acting: February 19, 2016 – November 29, 2018

Securities and Exchange Commission

Officeholder	Term start
Walter Stachnik	March 12, 1989
Nelson Egbert (acting)	August 6, 2007
David Kotz	December 5, 2007
Noelle Maloney (acting)	January 30, 2012
Jon Rymer (acting)	May 31, 2012
Carl Hoecker	February 11, 2013

Smithsonian Institution

Officeholder	Term start
John Fawsett (acting)	April 17, 1989
Thomas Blair	June 3, 1990
Debra Ritt	March 7, 2005
Sprightley Ryan	June 11, 2006; Acting: 2006–2007
Scott Dahl	January 15, 2012
Cathy Helm	July 14, 2014
Joan Mockeridge (Acting)	September 3, 2023
Nicole Angarella	May 20, 2024

Tennessee Valley Authority

Officeholder	Term start
Norman Zigrossi	January 25, 1986
George Prosser (acting)	April 16, 1992
William Hinshaw	May 4, 1992
George Prosser	April 1, 1994
Robert Thompson (acting)	August 22, 1999
George Prosser	March 18, 2000

=== Legislative agency inspectors general ===
Jurisdiction	Officeholder	Term start	Website
Architect of the Capitol (AOC-OIG)	Luiz A. Santos	July 2025	AOC-OIG
Capitol Police (USCP-OIG)	David T. Harper	February 5, 2024	[https://www.uscpoig.gov
Government Accountability Office (GAO-OIG)	L. Nancy Birnbaum	March 27, 2022	GAO-OIG
Government Publishing Office (GPO-OIG)	Nathan Deahl	March 1, 2023 Acting: March 1, 2023 - June 28, 2023	GPO-OIG
House of Representatives	Christen J. Stevenson	February 10, 2025; Acting: February 10, 2025 – February 25, 2026	House IG
Library of Congress (LOC-OIG)	Kimberly Benoit	November 2024	LOC-OIG

=== U.S. military ===
Within the United States Armed Forces, the position of inspector general is normally part of the personal staff serving a general or flag officer in a command position. The inspector general's office functions in two ways. To a certain degree they are ombudsmen for their branch of service. However, their primary function is to ensure the combat readiness of subordinate units in their command.

An armed services inspector general also investigates noncriminal allegations and some specific criminal allegations, to include determining if the matter should be referred for criminal investigation by the service's criminal investigative agency.

The Air Force Inspector General Complaints Program was established to address the concerns of Air Force active duty, reserve, and Guard members, civilian employees, family members, and retirees, as well as the interest of the Air Force. One of the first responsibilities of the Air Force inspector general is to operate a credible complaints program that investigates personnel complaints: Fraud, Waste, and Abuse (FWA) allegations; congressional inquiries; and issues involving the Air Force mission. Personnel complaints and FWA disclosures to the IG help commanders correct problems that affect the productivity, mission accomplishment, and morale of assigned personnel, which are areas of high concern to Air Force leaders at all levels.

Jurisdiction	Officeholder	Term start	Website
United States Air Force (DAF/IG)	David B. Lyons	November 10, 2025	USAF-OIG
United States Army (DAIG)	LTG Gregory J. Brady	March 17, 2025	DAIG
United States Navy (NAVINSGEN)	M. Wayne Baze	October 30, 2025	NAVINSGEN

=== Former ===
- ACTION
- Afghanistan Reconstruction (Special)
- Arms Control and Disarmament Agency (concurrent with State Department)
- Coalition Provisional Authority
- Federal Emergency Management Agency
- U.S. Information Agency
- Iraq Reconstruction (Special)
- Panama Canal Commission
- Pandemic Recovery (Special)
- Resolution Trust Corporation
- Troubled Asset Relief Program (Special)

=== Review boards ===
- Pandemic Response Accountability Committee
- Recovery Accountability and Transparency Board

== Stark Law and Anti-Kickback Statute enforcement ==
HHS-OIG develops and distributes resources to assist the health care industry in its efforts to comply with the nation's fraud and abuse laws and to educate the public about fraudulent schemes so that it can protect itself and report suspicious activities.

As of 2015, HHS-OIG had targeted hospitals and healthcare systems for Stark Law and Anti-Kickback Statute violations pertaining to the management of physician compensation arrangements. In 2015, a fraud alert was issued to publicize the OIG's intent to further regulate such non-compliance. In light of such efforts and consequent record-breaking settlements, healthcare experts have begun to call for the transition from paper-based physician time logging and contract management to automated solutions.

== Reception ==
=== Support ===
Glenn Fine argues that inspectors general save taxpayers billions of dollars a year and have the potential to save much more if given more resources and independence as well as more independent oversight of the inspectors general themselves. He also argues that the Supreme Court of the United States and all other institutions need independent and nonpartisan inspectors general.

=== Criticism ===
In the Thomas Andrews Drake case, some complainants to the Pentagon's OIG over NSA's Trailblazer Project were later raided by the FBI and threatened with criminal prosecution.

== See also ==
- 2020 dismissals of inspectors general during Donald Trump's first term
- 2025 dismissals of inspectors general during Donald Trump's second term
- Corruption Perceptions Index
- Federal law enforcement in the United States
- Independent agencies of the United States government
