= Recovery Accountability and Transparency Board =

Former agency of the United States government

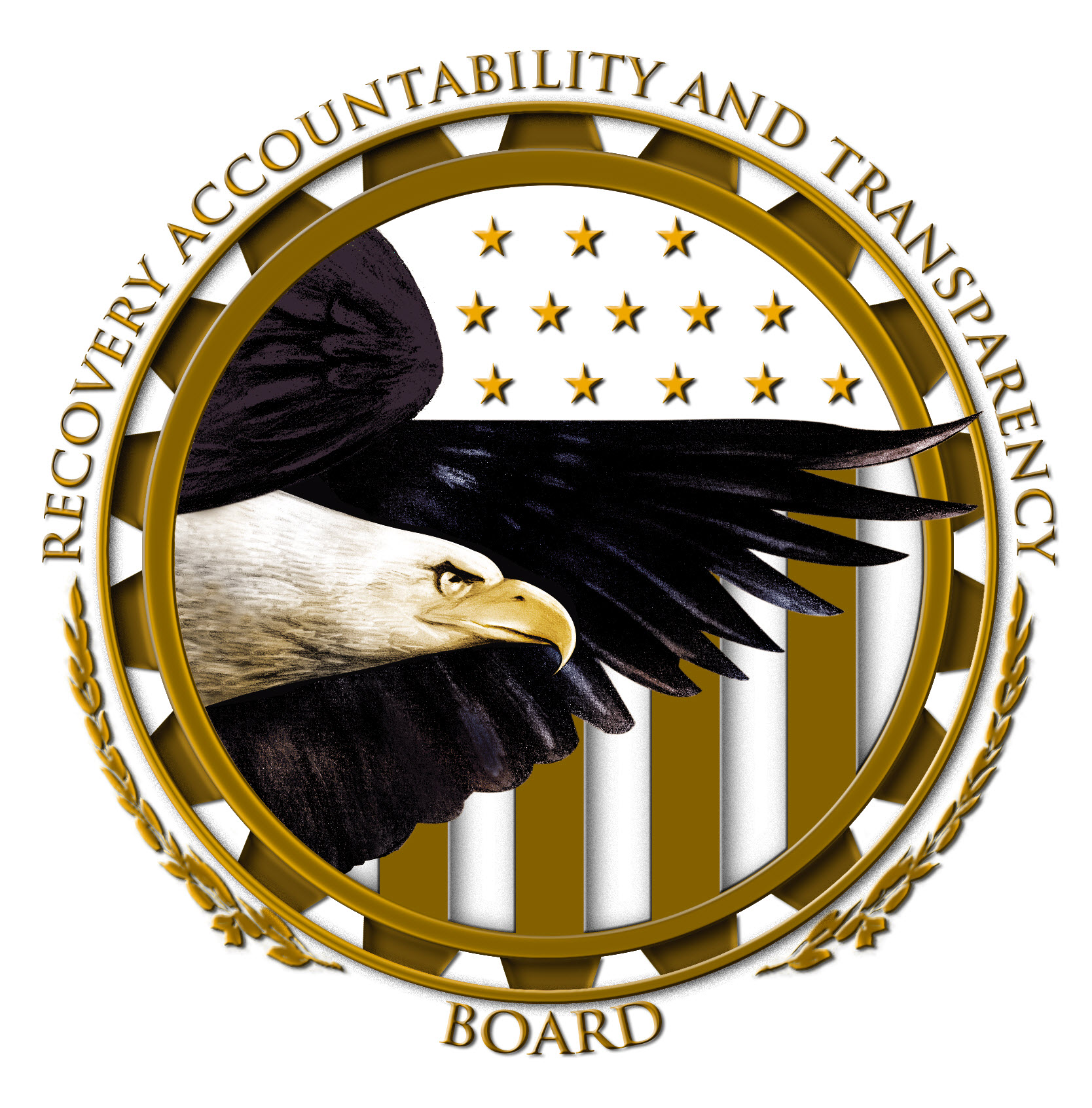
Recovery Accountability and Transparency Board Seal

The Recovery Accountability and Transparency Board was an agency of the United States federal government, which managed the Recovery.gov website and oversaw spending under the American Recovery and Reinvestment Act of 2009. Recovery.gov was the U.S. government’s official website that provided easy access to data related to Recovery Act spending and allowed for the reporting of potential fraud, waste, and abuse.

== Members ==
The following served as members of the RAT Board. The board existed from February 23, 2009 to September 30, 2015.

- Earl Devaney, Inspector General of the Department of the Interior (on leave from February 23, 2009) and Chair (until December 31, 2011)
  - Mary Kendall, Acting Inspector General of the Department of the Interior (from February 23, 2009)
- Glenn A. Fine, Inspector General of the Department of Justice (until January 29, 2011)
  - Cynthia Schnedar, Acting Inspector General of the Department of Justice (from January 29, 2011)
  - Michael E. Horowitz, Inspector General of the Department of Justice (from April 16, 2012)
- Phyllis Fong, Inspector General of the Department of Agriculture
- Gregory Friedman, Inspector General of the Department of Energy
- J. Russell George, Treasury Inspector General for Tax Administration of the Internal Revenue Service
- Gordon S. Heddell, Inspector General of the Department of Defense (until December 23, 2011)
  - Lynne Halbrooks, Acting Inspector General of the Department of Defense (from December 23, 2011)
  - Jon Rymer, Inspector General of the Department of Defense (from September 17, 2013)
- Daniel Levinson, Inspector General of the Department of Health and Human Services
- Mary Mitchelson, Acting Inspector General of the Department of Education (until March 17, 2010)
  - Kathleen Tighe, Inspector General of the Department of Education (from March 17, 2010) and Chair (from December 31, 2011)
- Calvin Scovel, Inspector General of the Department of Transportation and Vice Chair (from March 1, 2011)
- Richard Skinner, Inspector General of the Department of Homeland Security and Vice Chair (until March 1, 2011)
  - Charles Edwards, Acting Inspector General of the Department of Homeland Security (from March 1, 2011)
  - Carlton Mann, Acting Inspector General of the Department of Homeland Security (from December 17, 2014)
  - John Roth, Inspector General of the Department of Homeland Security (from March 10, 2014)
- Eric Thorson, Inspector General of the Department of the Treasury
- Todd Zinser, Inspector General of the Department of Commerce (until June 4, 2015)
  - Morgan Kim, Inspector General of the Department of Commerce (from June 4, 2015)

== Advisory Panel ==
Acting under the ARR Act, the President announced four appointees to the Recovery Independent Advisory Panel on March 5, 2010.

- Steven Koch, a vice chairman and co-chairman of Credit Suisse's Mergers and Acquisitions Group, based in Chicago;
- Chris Sale, vice president for development finance at CHF International;
- Malcolm Sparrow, professor of the practice of public management at Harvard Kennedy School at Harvard University;
- Edward Tufte, professor emeritus of political science, statistics, and computer science at Yale University.

== Government Accountability and Transparency Board ==
The government announced a separate Government Accountability and Transparency Board in July 2011 with the below membership.

- Dick Ginman, Director of Defense Procurement and Acquisition Policy and GAT Board Chair (from July 2012)
- Earl Devaney, Inspector General of the Department of the Interior (on leave) and Acting Chair (until December 31, 2011)
- Ash Carter, Under Secretary of Defense for Acquisition, Technology and Logistics
- W. Scott Gould, Deputy Secretary of Veterans Affairs
- Allison Lerner, Inspector General of the National Science Foundation
- Daniel Levinson, Inspector General of the Department of Health and Human Services
- Ellen Murray, Assistant Secretary of Health and Human Services for Financial Resources and Chief Financial Officer
- Calvin Scovel, Inspector General of the Department of Transportation
- Kathleen Tighe, Inspector General of the Department of Education
- Daniel Werfel, Controller of the Office of Management and Budget
- David Williams, Inspector General of the Postal Service and Vice Chair
- Neal S. Wolin, Deputy Secretary of the Treasury

== See also ==
- Title 4 of the Code of Federal Regulations
- Title 31 of the Code of Federal Regulations
