= Katten Muchin Rosenman =

Full-service law firm

Katten Muchin Rosenman LLP (Katten)
- Headquarters: 525 West Monroe Street Chicago, IL, 60661
- No. of offices: 9
- No. of attorneys: 650 (2025)
- Key people: Gil M. Soffer (Chairman); Noah Heller (CEO)
- Revenue: $713.9 million (2021)
- Founder: Melvin L. Katten; Allan B. Muchin; Samuel Rosenman
- Company type: Limited liability partnership
- Website: www.katten.com

Katten Muchin Rosenman LLP (Katten) is a full-service law firm in locations across the United States, London and Shanghai. The firm's practice includes commercial finance, financial markets and funds, intellectual property, structured finance and securitization, transactional tax planning, and private wealth. Katten represents public and private companies in numerous industries, as well as a number of government and nonprofit organizations and individuals.

The firm was formed on December 31, 2002 through the merger of Chicago-based Katten Muchin & Zavis (founded in 1974) and New York City-based Rosenman & Colin (founded in 1912).

== Rankings and recognition ==
=== Practices ===
Katten's attorneys and practices have been ranked in the BTI Litigation Outlook, Chambers Global, Chambers USA, Chambers UK, The Legal 500 United States, The Legal 500 United Kingdom and US News – Best Lawyers “Best Law Firms.” 2018 as a top-tier Honor Roll firm in the areas of IP Litigation, Class Actions, Securities and Finance Litigation, and Complex Employment Litigation. The firm's trusts and estates practice was recognized as an industry leader in the Chambers High Net Worth 2017 guide for top talent and cross-border excellence.

Katten was highly ranked for US ABS/MBS Securitizations and CLO Underwriting Counsel. The firm was ranked second place for a fourth year among the most active issuers' counsel for US asset-backed and mortgage-backed securitizations and is in the top 10 of underwriters' counsel for US asset-backed and mortgage-backed securitizations. Its Commercial Finance practice was named one of the top 10 dealmakers of 2017 and 2018 by Franchise Times, advising on more than 75 deals annually in the franchise and restaurant space, with loan sizes ranging from $25 million to more than $800 million. Katten was recognized for its trademark services by World Trademark Review 1000 – The World's Leading Trademark Professionals (WTR 1000). The firm's Sports and Sports Facilities practice was selected as a “go-to” firm for Sports Law in Chicago. In 2025, a former Katten Muchin Rosenman partner has sued the U.S. law firm and its top leadership for $67 million for allegedly crippling his practice and eventually firing him due to his age.

=== Diversity ===
Katten is frequently honored for its diversity and women's programs by legal publications such as MultiCultural Law Magazine, mainstream publications such as Working Mother magazine and by business groups such as the National Association for Female Executives (NAFE) rankings of Top 50 Companies for Executive Women. Katten was named one of the “Best Places to Work for LGBT Equality” by the Human Rights Campaign every year from 2009 to 2018 and by Equality Illinois as one of the top Illinois law firms for LGBT inclusiveness and equality every year from 2012 to 2017. The firm was recognized by the Leadership Council on Legal Diversity as a Top Performer and recipient of the Compass Award in 2018 and 2019.

Katten was certified for meeting the standards of the Mansfield Rule 2.0, which directs law firms to consider at least 30 percent women, LGBTQ+ and minority attorneys for significant leadership roles. The Mansfield Rule, a winning idea from the 2016 Women in Law Hackathon hosted by Diversity Lab in collaboration with Bloomberg Law and Stanford Law School, was inspired by the NFL's Rooney Rule, which requires NFL teams to interview at least one minority candidate for head coach vacancies. Diversity Lab's Mansfield Rule was named after Arabella Mansfield, the first woman admitted to practice law in the United States. The firm is currently participating in the third version of the Mansfield Rule, which includes attorneys with disabilities.

== Notable attorneys and alumni ==
- Richard M. Daley, former Mayor of Chicago joined the firm on June 1, 2011
- Jeremy C. Daniel (born 1978), U.S. district judge of the United States District Court for the Northern District of Illinois
- Timmy Knudsen (born 1990/1991), alderman in the Chicago City Council
- Mandie Landry, member of the Louisiana House of Representatives
- Gerald Walpin (1931 –2016), Inspector General of the Corporation for National and Community Service
