= Gerald Walpin =

American lawyer and author

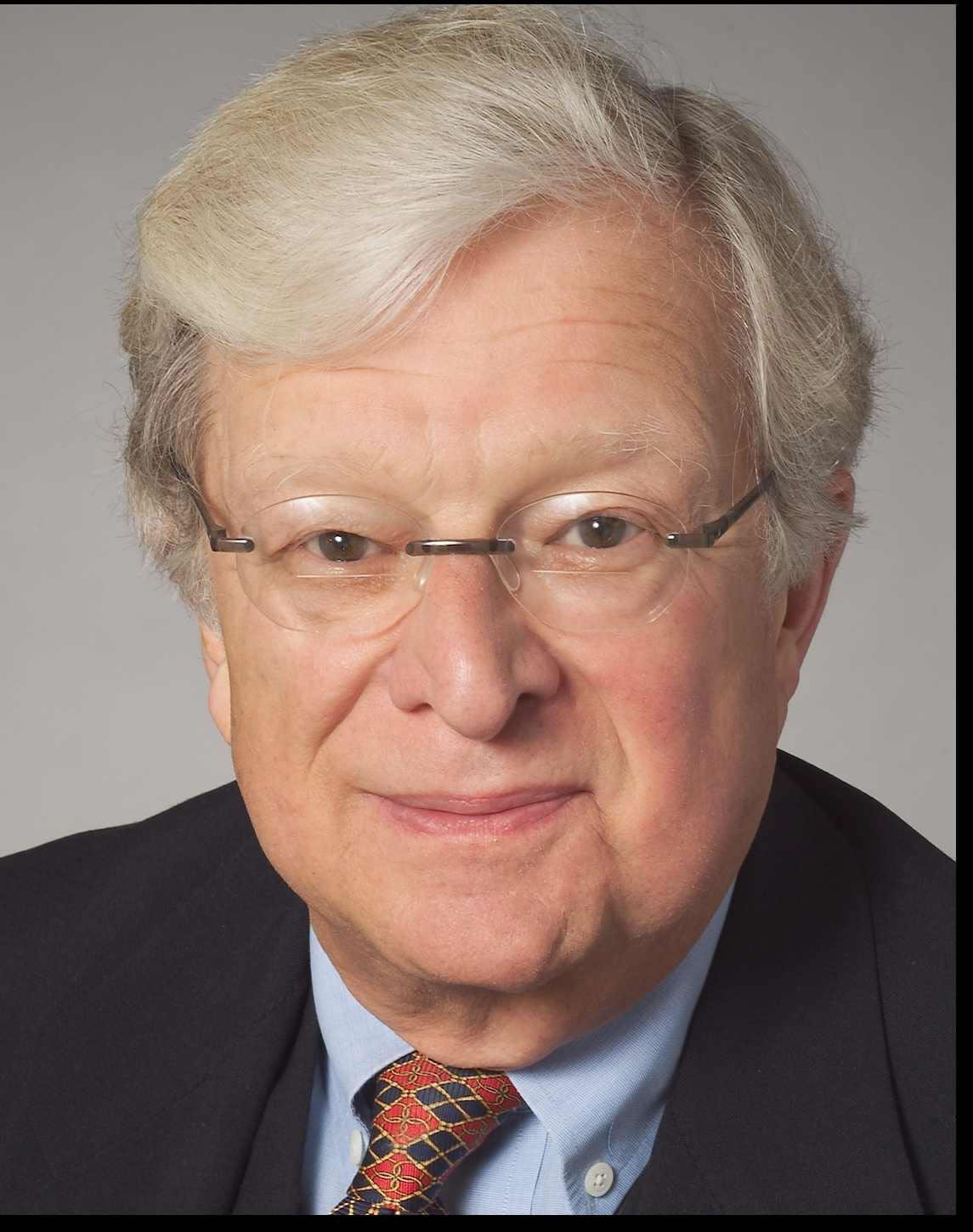

Inspector General of the Corporation for National and Community Service
- In office January 8, 2007 – July 12, 2009
- President: George W. Bush; Barack Obama
- Preceded by: Carol Bates (Acting)
- Succeeded by: Kenneth Bach (Acting)

Personal details
- Born: September 1, 1931 New York City, U.S.
- Died: June 24, 2016 (aged 84) New York City, U.S.
- Education: City University of New York, City College (BA); Yale University (LLB)

Gerald Walpin (September 1, 1931 – June 24, 2016) was an American lawyer and author. He served as the Inspector General of the Corporation for National and Community Service (CNCS) from January 2007 until June 2009, when he was removed by U.S. President Barack Obama. Republicans asserted that Obama removal of Walpin was politically motivated since Walpin was investigating Kevin Johnson whom was a friend and supporter of Obama.

== Personal life ==
Walpin was born September 1, 1931, in New York City, and graduated from the City College of New York in 1952. He attended Yale Law School, where he was managing editor of the Yale Law Journal, graduating cum laude in 1955. Walpin was married, and had three children and six grandchildren.

== Career ==
From 1957 to 1960, he served in the United States Air Force Judge Advocate General, with a rank of lieutenant.

Walpin was an Assistant U.S. Attorney and Chief of Special Prosecutions for the United States Attorney for the Southern District of New York for five years, after which he went on to become a senior partner at the New York-based law firm Rosenman & Colin LLP—and then of counsel at its successor Katten Muchin Rosenman LLP—for a combined total of over 40 years.

From 2002 to 2004, Walpin was president of the Federal Bar Council, an association of attorneys who practice in the courts within the Second Circuit. He received the American Inns of Court Professionalism Award in 2003 for outstanding professionalism as an attorney and for mentoring younger lawyers.

== Inspector General of CNCS ==
=== Appointment by George W. Bush ===
On August 3, 2006, President George W. Bush nominated Walpin as Inspector General (IG) of Corporation for National and Community Service (CNCS), an office in the CNCS charged with conducting independent and object audits, investigations, and inspections of the CNCS and its service programs, which include AmeriCorps, Volunteers in Service to America (VISTA), and Senior Corps. After he was confirmed by the U.S. Senate on December 9, 2006, Walpin was sworn in on January 8, 2007.

=== Americorps investigations ===
After its May 20, 2009 meeting that discussed Walpin's report criticizing the St. HOPE Academy settlement agreement and Walpin's forthcoming report questioning the validity of the largest AmeriCorps program—the Research Foundation of City University of New York (RFCUNY) New York City Teaching Fellows program, the bipartisan CNCS Board of Directors unanimously requested that the White House review Walpin's conduct as Inspector General.

=== Removal and lawsuit ===
Walpin was suspended with pay on June 11, 2009, by President Barack Obama, who on the same day advised the U.S. Congress that he would remove Walpin from office, effective 30 days from then, because Obama no longer had "the fullest confidence in" him as Inspector General. and on June 16, 2009, the White House submitted a letter with additional information on the reasons Walpin was removed. However Republicans Chuck Grassley and Darrell Issa have asserted that Walpin's firing was politically motivated due to the fact that Walpin was investigating Kevin Johnson, a friend and supporter of Barack Obama, for sexual assault and other allegations during the time he was fired by Obama.

On July 17, 2009, Walpin filed a civil lawsuit in federal court seeking his reinstatement, arguing that his removal violated the 2008 Inspector General Act. On July 20, 2009, Walpin issued a statement saying the primary reason for his lawsuit was to protect future Inspectors General.

On October 19, 2009, the chairman of the Integrity Committee of the Council of the Inspectors General on Integrity and Efficiency (CIGIE) notified Walpin that his response to an April 29, 2009 complaint about him by acting U.S. Attorney Lawrence G. Brown on May 20, 2009, had sufficiently and satisfactorily addressed the matter, and closed the complaint.

On June 17, 2010, U.S. District Court Judge Richard W. Roberts dismissed Walpin's suit.

== Death ==
Gerald Walpin died on June 24, 2016, in a hospital after being hit by the driver of a sport utility vehicle in Manhattan while crossing at Lexington Avenue and East 79th Street.
