= Title IV =

Title IV may refer to:

- Title IV of the Civil Rights Act of 1964, a title that enforced the desegregation of public schools in the United States of America.
- Title IV of the Higher Education Act of 1965, a title that dictates and authorizes federal financial aid programs for post-secondary education in the United States of America.
- Title 4 of the United States Code, a title that outlines the role and design parametrics of the American Flag, Seal, the District of Columbia, and the states.
- Title 4 of the Code of Federal Regulations, containing the principal set of rules and regulations issued by federal agencies regarding accounts
