= Rehnquist (surname) =

Rehnquist is a surname of Swedish origin. The name element "-quist," a variant of Swedish kvist 'twig,' was in the nineteenth century often used to form surnames in combination with words denoting natural features, here apparently with Swedish ren 'strip of land.' Notable people with the surname include:

- Björn Rehnquist (born 1978), professional Swedish tennis player
- Janet Rehnquist (born 1957), former inspector general of the United States Department of Health and Human Services
- Milt Rehnquist (1892–1971), American football offensive lineman in the National Football League
- William Rehnquist (1924–2005), American lawyer, jurist, and Chief Justice of the United States Supreme Court
