= U.S. Department of the Treasury, Office of Inspector General =

U.S. federal government office for investigative officials

- Formed: 1988
- Headquarters: Washington, D.C.
- Parent agency: U.S. Department of the Treasury
- Inspector General: Loren J. Sciurba (Acting)
- Website: oig.treasury.gov

The U.S. Department of the Treasury Office of Inspector General (USDT-OIG or Treasury OIG) is one of the Inspector General offices created by the Inspector General Act Amendments of 1988. The Inspector General for the Department of the Treasury is charged with investigating and auditing department programs to combat waste, fraud, and abuse.

The Inspector General for the Department of the Treasury is charged with conducting independent audits, investigations and reviews to help the Treasury Department accomplish its mission; improve its programs and operations; promote economy, efficiency and effectiveness; and prevent and detect fraud and abuse.

== History of Inspectors General ==
Inspector General	Appointment Date
Loren J. Sciurba (Acting)	January 3, 2025
Richard Delmar (Acting)	June 30, 2019
Eric Thorson	August 12, 2008
Dennis S. Schindel (Acting IG)	April 30, 2007
Harold Damelin	April 4, 2005
Dennis S. Schindel (Acting IG)	April 3, 2004
Jeffrey A. Rush Jr.	July 30, 1999
Lawrence W. Rogers (Acting)	May 17, 1999
David C. Williams	October 26, 1998
Richard B. Calahan (Deputy IG)	February 9, 1998
Valerie Lau	October 11, 1994
Robert Cesca (Deputy IG)	January 21, 1993
Donald E. Kirkendall	November 22, 1989
Robert P. Cesca (Acting)	June 1, 1989
Michael R. Hill (Principal Deputy IG)	April 16, 1989
Michael R. Hill	April 6, 1986
John C. Layton	September 9, 1984
Emily Marwell (Acting)	February 26, 1984
Paul K. Trause	August 12, 1981
Eugene H. Essner (Acting)	February 1, 1981
Leon G. Wigrizer	August 18, 1978
