= United States Postal Service Office of Inspector General =

USPS oversight and management division

Agency overview
- Formed: 1996
- Headquarters: Arlington, VA
- Agency executive: Tammy Hull, Inspector General
- Parent agency: United States Postal Service
- Website: https://www.uspsoig.gov

The United States Postal Service Office of Inspector General (OIG) was created by Public Law 104–208, passed by Congress in 1996. The inspector general of the United States Postal Service (USPS) is appointed by the presidentially appointed Postal Service Governors and the Postal Regulatory Commissioners. In October 2022, the OIG assumed oversight of USPS’s regulator, the Postal Regulatory Commission (PRC).

The term of the inspector general is a maximum of seven years, with the possibility of reappointment. To ensure accountability, the inspector general keeps Congress, the governors, the PRC, and USPS management informed of the office's work and alerted to potential areas where the Postal Service could be more economical and efficient.

The OIG achieves its mission of helping maintain confidence in the postal system and improving the Postal Service's bottom line through independent audits and investigations. Audits of postal programs and operations help to determine whether the programs and operations are efficient and cost-effective. Investigations help prevent and detect fraud, waste, abuse and misconduct and have a deterrent effect on postal crimes.

The United States Postal Inspection Service is a separate agency.

== History ==
- The current USPS inspector general is Tammy Hull, who was appointed by the governors of the Board of Governors of the United States Postal Service on November 29, 2018. She is the USPS's third inspector general. She served as Deputy Inspector General from November 2011 and was acting Inspector General from February 2016 until her appointment. By joint resolution in May 2025, the Board of Governors and Postal Regulatory Commissioners reappointed Tammy Hull to a second seven-year term as the inspector general, to end on November 29, 2032.
- USPS's second inspector general was David C. Williams, who was inspector general from August 20, 2003, until he resigned on February 19, 2016. In June 2013, Williams criticized the Postal Service's real estate contract with CBRE, a multinational real estate company, citing "conflict of interest concerns." Williams served as governor on the USPS Board of Governors from August 2018 through April 2020.
- The first USPS inspector general was Karla W. Corcoran, who held the position from January 1997, after the position was created in 1996. She resigned on August 19, 2003, after a federal investigation found that she abused her authority, wasted public money and promoted questionable personnel practices.
  Old Logo of the United States Postal Service Office of Inspector General used from 1996-2007.

== List of United States Postal Service inspectors general ==
#	Portrait	Name	Term began	Term ended
1		Karla W. Corcoran	January 1997	August 19, 2003
2		David C. Williams	August 20, 2003	February 19, 2016
3		Tammy Hull	February 19, 2016	November 29, 2018 (acting)
3		Tammy Hull	November 29, 2018	Incumbent

== See also ==
- United States Postal Inspection Service
- Office of Inspector General (United States)
