= Julie A. MacDonald =

Julie A. MacDonald (born July 14, 1955) is a former deputy assistant secretary for Fish and Wildlife and Parks at the United States Department of the Interior. MacDonald was appointed by former Secretary of the Interior Gale Norton on May 3, 2004 and resigned on May 1, 2007 after an internal investigation found that she had "injected herself personally and profoundly in a number of Endangered Species Act decisions", a violation of the Code of Federal Regulations under Use of Nonpublic Information and Basic Obligation of Public Service, Appearance of Preferential Treatment.

== Biography ==
MacDonald graduated from the University of California, Davis in 1978 with a degree in civil engineering. She joined the Department of the Interior in 1979 as a hydraulic engineer with the Bureau of Reclamation. Starting in 1987, MacDonald worked as a government administrator, including at the California Resources Agency. MacDonald returned to the U.S. Department of the Interior in 2002 as an aide to the assistant secretary for Fish and Wildlife and Parks, the official who oversees the United States Fish and Wildlife Service (FWS) and the National Park Service, two of the eight bureaus in the Department of the Interior. On May 3, 2004, Interior Secretary Gale Norton promoted MacDonald to be deputy assistant secretary for fish and wildlife and parks in the Department of the Interior.

== Events leading to resignation ==
On October 30, 2006, the Union of Concerned Scientists, a nonprofit politically active group that advocates for scientific integrity, alleged that MacDonald had "personally reversed scientific findings, changed scientific conclusions to prevent endangered species from receiving protection, removed relevant information from a scientific document, and ordered the Fish and Wildlife Service to adopt her edits."

That year, the Department of the Interior Inspector General Earl E. Devaney undertook an investigation into the allegations against MacDonald. In March 2007, Devaney issued his report of that investigation, leveling charges of misconduct against MacDonald. Although Devaney's investigation did not find evidence of illegal activity, his two chief conclusions were that MacDonald had repeatedly violated the Code of Federal Regulations (C.F.R.), Use of Nonpublic Information and Basic Obligation of Public Service, Appearance of Preferential Treatment by giving nonpublic, internal government documents to oil industry and property rights groups, and that MacDonald had manipulated and undermined scientific findings in order to favor the George W. Bush administration's policy goals and assist land developers. According to the Inspector General, "MacDonald has been heavily involved with editing, commenting on, and reshaping the Endangered Species Program's scientific reports from the field."

MacDonald resigned on May 1, 2007, one week before a House congressional oversight committee was to hold a hearing on the Inspector General's findings. MacDonald commented that she resigned due to public pressure. In November 2007, a follow-up report by the Inspector General found that MacDonald could have benefited financially from a decision to remove the Sacramento splittail fish from the federal endangered species list.

The Washington Post called the events leading to MacDonald's resignation "the latest in a series of controversies in which government officials and outside scientists have accused the Bush administration of overriding or setting aside scientific findings that clashed with its political agenda." In the aftermath of her departure, many endangered species decisions issued during her tenure were reversed.

== Aftermath ==
The Inspector General's findings led the Fish and Wildlife Service to reopen endangered species decisions made under MacDonald's supervision. The agency's director H. Dale Hall, called MacDonald's conduct "a blemish on the scientific integrity of the Fish and Wildlife Service and the Department of the Interior." Hall reopened the agency's assessment of the southwest willow flycatcher after alleging that MacDonald had told field personnel to reduce the bird's natural nesting range from 2.1 miles to 1.8 miles. Hall also told the inspector general that MacDonald had altered range estimates for the willow flycatcher because a critical habitat designation might impact family property in California. However, MacDonald maintained that the property is nearly 300 miles from flycatcher habitat, and that her alteration of the bird's range was approved by agency experts, including Hall, a former wildlife biologist.

Eight other endangered species decisions were reopened, including the white-tailed prairie dog, Preble's meadow jumping mouse, arroyo toad, California red-legged frog, and the Canada lynx. In November 2007, the FWS announced that of the eight species reviewed, seven had been returned to endangered status. In December 2007, the US District Court for the District of Idaho overturned the FWS rejection of a petition to list the sage grouse as threatened and endangered, citing misconduct by MacDonald. In its decision, the court wrote that "The FWS decision was tainted by the inexcusable conduct of one of its own executives...who was neither a scientist nor a sage-grouse expert, had a well-documented history of intervening in the listing process." In 2010, after a second review, the Department of the Interior assigned the bird a status known as "warranted but precluded," essentially putting the bird on the waiting list (behind more critically threatened species) for endangered species protection. Even though the sage grouse was not added to the endangered species list, the 2010 decision essentially reversed MacDonald's 2004 ruling, in which the Department of the Interior claimed that the bird was not threatened. The New York Times characterized the decision made under her leadership as "tainted by political tampering".

In September 2008, the U.S. Fish and Wildlife Service proposed to more than triple the habitat of the California red-legged frog. The 2008 decision ignored that which was reached under MacDonald, due to "the involvement of Department of Interior personnel which may have inappropriately influenced the extent and locations of critical habitat". According to the LA Times, "The agency revisited the original habitat designation, citing scientific miscalculations and political manipulation by a former Interior Department official, Julie MacDonald."

A December 2008 report by Inspector General Devaney found that MacDonald had interfered with 13 of the 20 endangered species rulings that were reevaluated. In a letter to U.S. Senator Ron Wyden, chairman of the Senate Subcommittee on Public Lands and Forests, Devaney said, "MacDonald injected herself personally and profoundly in a number of ESA decisions. We determined that MacDonald's management style was abrupt and abrasive, if not abusive, and that her conduct demoralized and frustrated her staff as well as her subordinate managers." Wyden, who commissioned the report, said "This report makes it crystal clear how one person’s contempt for the public trust can infect an entire agency...[MacDonald caused] significant harm to the integrity of the Endangered Species Act (ESA) and...untold waste of hundreds of thousands of taxpayers' dollars."

== Post-government positions ==
Between 2009 and 2013, MacDonald spent at least $530,000 as a lobbyist on endangered-species issues, and was co-author of a commentary on the Endangered Species Act in the December 27, 2013, edition of the Wall Street Journal.
