= Sean O'Donnell (EPA) =

American lawyer

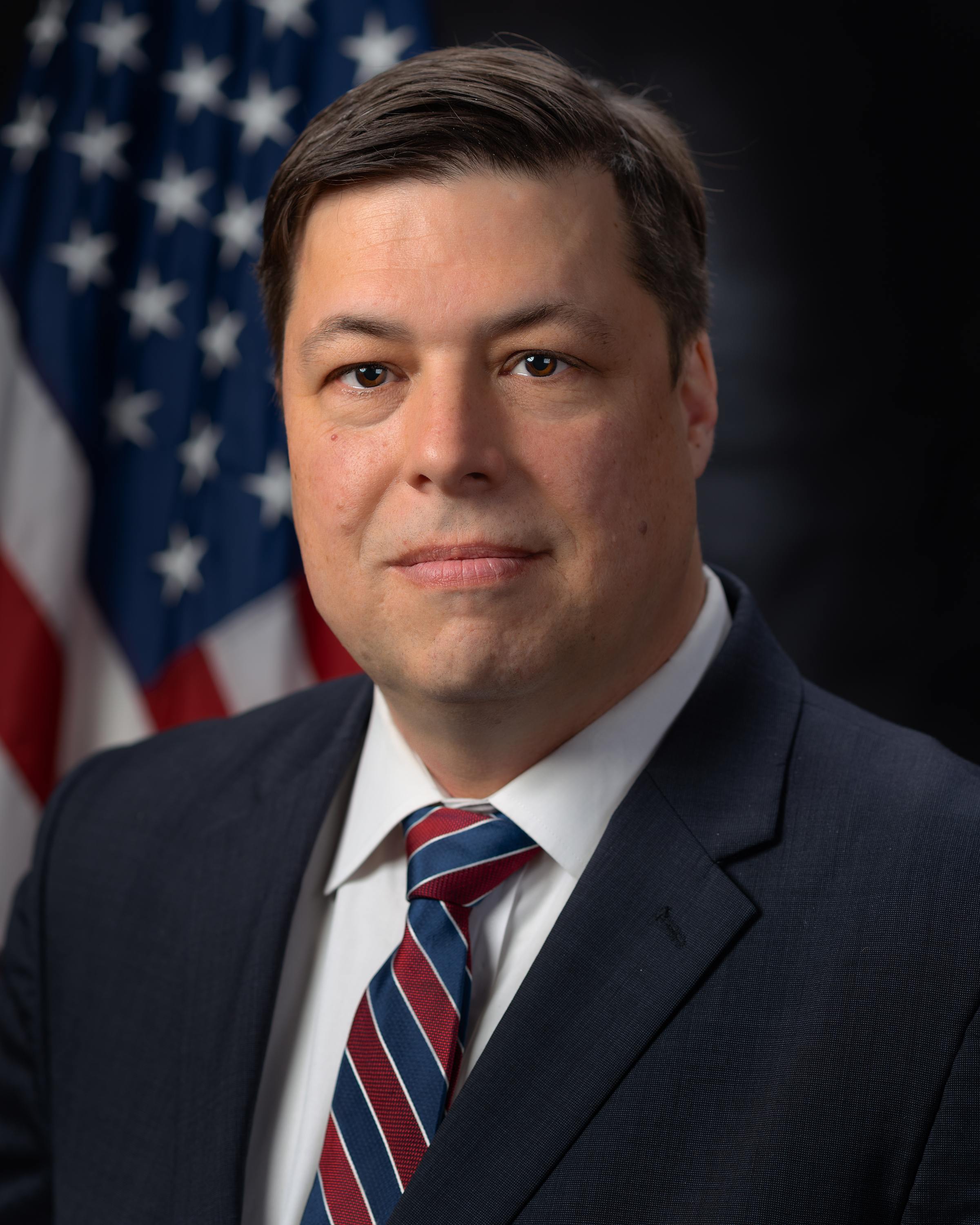
- Official portrait, 2020

Inspector General of the Environmental Protection Agency
- In office January 27, 2020 – January 24, 2025
- President: Donald Trump; Joe Biden; Donald Trump
- Preceded by: Chuck Sheehan (acting)
- Succeeded by: Nicole Murley (acting)

Acting Inspector General of the Department of Defense
- In office April 6, 2020 – December 6, 2022
- President: Donald Trump; Joe Biden
- Preceded by: Glenn A. Fine (acting)
- Succeeded by: Robert Storch

Personal details
- Education: Texas A&M University (BS); University of Washington (BA); University of Texas, Austin (MS, JD)

Sean William O'Donnell is the Inspector General of the U.S. Environmental Protection Agency. He was previously appointed to be the acting Inspector General of the U.S. Department of Defense in April 2020, resulting in his membership on the Pandemic Response Accountability Committee, which oversees $2.2 trillion in government spending.

== Early life and education ==
O’Donnell graduated from Bothell High School in Bothell, Washington, then earned a bachelor's degree in economics from Texas A&M University and a bachelor's degree in mathematics from the University of Washington. He also attended the University of Texas at Austin, where he earned a master's degree in economics and a degree in law.

== Career ==
After graduating from law school, O’Donnell clerked for Judge Harry Lee Hudspeth of the U.S. District Court for the Western District of Texas in Austin, Texas, and for Judge Raymond Gruender of the U.S. Court of Appeals for the Eighth Circuit in St. Louis, Missouri. He also spent time in private practice, working on intellectual property and antitrust litigation, among other matters.

Prior to becoming the Inspector General of the Environmental Protection Agency, O’Donnell spent 15 years at the U.S. Department of Justice, including as prosecutor in the Bank Integrity Unit of the Criminal Division's Money Laundering and Asset Recovery Section. Over his career at the Justice Department, he handled a wide range of criminal and civil matters, such as civil rights, commercial and governmental fraud, corruption, and national security matters.

O’Donnell was nominated to be the EPA Inspector General on October 15, 2019, and confirmed unanimously by the Senate on December 19, 2019. Sworn in shortly thereafter, O’Donnell is responsible for promoting economy and efficiency at the EPA and the U.S. Chemical Safety and Hazard Investigation Board, as well as detect and prevent waste, fraud, and abuse related to the programs and operations of those two agencies. To this end, O’Donnell oversees a nationwide workforce of approximately 300 attorneys, auditors, special agents, and support personnel who support the Office's mission by providing evidence-based reports to the agencies, the public, and to Congress.

On April 6, 2020, O’Donnell was appointed the acting Inspector General of the U.S. Department of Defense in addition to serving as the EPA Inspector General. During O’Donnell’s nearly three year tenure, which ended at the end of 2022, his office recovered nearly $3.5 billion in civil and criminal cases and issued 331 reports, identifying over $1.25 billion in potential benefit to the DoD. His office’s notable work included a review of the DoD’s role in preparing for and responding to the protest at the U.S. Capitol on January 6, 2021, an evaluation of the U.S. Space Command basing decision, and an evaluation of the DoD’s screening of displaced Afghans. O’Donnell also served as the Lead Inspector General for Oversight Contingency Operations, leading inter-office oversight of Operation Enduring Freedom, Operation Inherent Resolve, and, most recently, the U.S. government’s assistance to Ukraine.

On January 24, 2025, he was fired by President Donald Trump along with several other inspectors general, although the legality of the firings remains under question.
