= Samuel Rosenman =

American politician (1896–1973)

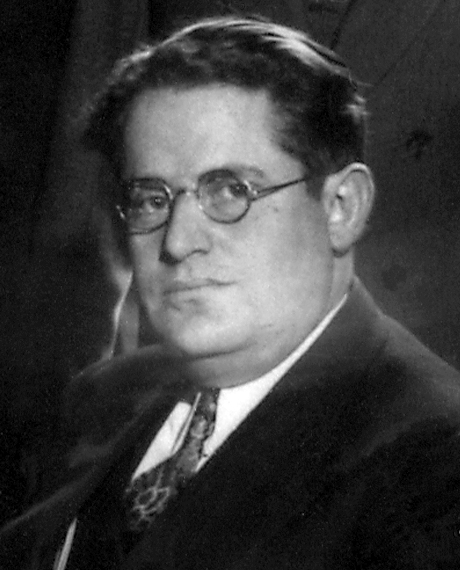
- Rosenman in 1930

White House Counsel
- In office October 2, 1943 – February 1, 1946
- President: Franklin D. Roosevelt; Harry Truman
- Preceded by: Position established
- Succeeded by: Clark Clifford

Personal details
- Born: Samuel Irving Rosenman; February 13, 1896 San Antonio, Texas, U.S.
- Died: June 24, 1973 (aged 77) New York City, New York, U.S.
- Party: Democratic
- Education: Columbia University (AB, LLB)

Samuel Irving Rosenman (February 13, 1896 – June 24, 1973) was an American lawyer, judge, Democratic Party activist, and presidential speechwriter. He coined the term "New Deal", and helped articulate liberal policies during the heyday of the New Deal coalition. He was the first person to hold the position of White House Counsel.

== Personal life and political career ==
Rosenman was born in San Antonio, Texas, the son of Solomon and Ethel (Paler) Rosenman, both Jews. He served in the US Army during World War I and graduated from Columbia Law School in 1919. He was a member of Phi Beta Kappa and Delta Sigma Rho.

He became active in Democratic politics and was a member of the New York State Assembly (New York Co., 11th D.) in 1922, 1923, 1924, 1925 and 1926; and a justice of the New York Supreme Court (1st D.) from 1936 to 1943. By the mid-1930s, Rosenman had emerged as a leading spokesman for the New York Jewish community.

Rosenman was a senior advisor to presidents Franklin Roosevelt and Harry Truman. Under their administrations, he was a leading figure in the war crimes issue. He was also the first official White House Counsel, then called Special Counsel, between 1943 and 1946.

He was a speechwriter under both presidents, helping Roosevelt with his speeches from his days as governor. Rosenman was responsible for the term "New Deal", a phrase in the conclusion of FDR's acceptance speech at the 1932 Democratic National Convention. While he was not heavily involved in speechwriting during Roosevelt's first term, he started traveling to Washington to help out with important talks during the 1936 campaign and was a key speech aide for the remainder of Roosevelt's life. He officially joined the White House after ill health forced him to have to choose between his judicial work and his presidential work.

Beginning in 1940, Rosenman was frequently engaged by F.D.R. to assist in the reorganization of Government agencies to create greater efficiency in war mobilization. He coordinated the meetings and discussions that led to the reorganization of agencies overseeing production of war materials, allocation of resources, housing, control of inflation and other domestic concerns critical to the war effort.

He submitted his resignation as Special Counsel upon Roosevelt's death but Truman asked him to stay on, initially through V-E Day, then through V-J Day, and finally into 1946. Rosenman wrote the 1946 State of the Union Address for Truman on his own in 1946. Even after leaving the White House, he would periodically return to aid President Truman with major speeches, including his acceptance speech to the 1948 Democratic National Convention.

Rosenman's memoir, Working with Roosevelt, is one of the most quoted and praised first-person accounts of the Roosevelt administration.

Rosenman was married to housing activist Dorothy Rosenman. Rosenman's granddaughter Lynn is the wife of former United States Attorney General and former United States Supreme Court Nominee, Merrick Garland. he died in New York.

== Editor ==
Rosenman edited The Public Papers and Addresses of Franklin D. Roosevelt, published in 13 volumes from 1938 to 1950. They have extensive notes; the last four volumes published under Rosenman's name, notes to the earlier volumes published as Roosevelt's. The volumes have been immensely influential in the study of the New Deal and Roosevelt's policies; given the enormous mass of data at the Roosevelt Library in Hyde Park, the papers have been used by historians as a guide, a conceptual framework, and a source. While his selections have given rise to some accusations of partisan selectivity and of deviations from the content of delivered speeches, the work still holds up remarkably well as an important piece of scholarship, and Rosenman will long be remembered as the Thucydides of the Roosevelt era, according to Hand (1968).

== Holocaust ==
As a member of the American Jewish Committee, Rosenman was actively involved in addressing issues of concern to the Jewish community. He was a member of its Survey Committee, which worked to reduce antisemitism in the United States by promoting national unity. The Committee considered some of the actions of Jewish activists as unproductive in promoting, rather than dispelling, notions of difference rather than of unity. The Survey Committee believed that the most effective answer to antisemitism was to attack it as Unamerican in its divisive purpose. The Survey Committee emphasized the importance of unity in standing up to the Nazi menace and was influential, in part through Rosenman, in having Roosevelt promote and emphasize national unity in many of his speeches before and after the US entry entered World War II.

On October 6, 1943, three days before Yom Kippur, Hillel Kook (also known as Peter Bergson) organized a march to Washington, DC (the famous Rabbis March), by a delegation of some 400 rabbis, most if not all Orthodox and some recent immigrants, to make a public appeal to the United States government to do more to try to rescue the abandoned Jews of Europe. It was the only such protest in Washington during the Holocaust. The rabbis were received at the steps of the Capitol by the Senate majority and minority leaders, and the Speaker of the House. After prayers for the war effort at the Lincoln Memorial, the rabbis went to the White House to plead with President Roosevelt and were told that the President was busy all day and Vice President Henry Wallace met them instead. It was later learned that Roosevelt had several free hours that afternoon, but was advised by both Stephen Wise (head of the World Jewish Congress) and Rosenman (who, in addition to being the President's advisor and speech writer, also headed the American Jewish Committee) that the protesting rabbis "were not representative" of American Jewry and not the kind of Jews he should meet. Wise also accused the rabbis of "offending the dignity of the Jewish people."

Historian Rafael Medoff, founder of The David Wyman Institute (named after Holocaust historian David Wyman) characterizes Rosenman: "One of FDR’s top advisers and speechwriters was Samuel Rosenman, a leading member of the American Jewish Committee. Rosenman, a deeply assimilated Jew, was uncomfortable calling attention to Jewish concerns. During the 1930's, antisemitism was increasing in the United States, stoked by the virulent tirades of popular antisemitic personalities such as Father Charles Coughlin, and later aided, perhaps unwittingly, by the arguments of ardent isolationists such as Charles Lindbergh. Rosenman was sensitive to the destructive charges that Roosevelt was led by a "Jewish cabal" and, as with many leading Jews, fearful that antisemitism in the United States could increase further. After the 1938 Kristallnacht pogroms, he warned FDR that admitting German Jewish refugees to America would “create a Jewish problem in the U.S.”

== Later career ==
From 1964 to 1966, Rosenman served as president of the New York City Bar Association. He was also the name partner of Rosenman & Colin that merged with Katten Muchin & Zavis to become Katten Muchin Rosenman. He also briefly served as chairman of 20th century Fox in 1962.

== Publications ==
- Samuel Rosenman, Working with Roosevelt (1952)
- Samuel and Dorothy Rosenman, Presidential Style: Some Giants and a Pigmy in the White House (1976)

== See also ==
- List of Jewish American jurists

== General sources ==
- Hand, Samuel B. (1968). "Rosenman, Thucydides, and the New Deal". Journal of American History. 55 (2): 334–348. doi:10.2307/1899562. JSTOR 1899562.
- Hand, Samuel B. (1979). Counsel and Advise: A Political Biography of Samuel I. Rosenman. New York: Garland. ISBN 0-8240-3632-8. The standard scholarly biography.
- Ryan, Halford R. (1988). Franklin D. Roosevelt's Rhetorical Presidency (1988) online edition

=== Primary sources ===
- Rosenman, Samuel I. (1952). Working with Roosevelt.
- Roosevelt, Franklin D. (1938). Rosenman, Samuel Irving (ed.). The Public Papers and Addresses of Franklin D. Roosevelt. Vol. 5. Random House. Archived from the original on October 22, 2012 – via Questia.

New York State Assembly
Preceded by Frederick H. Nichols	New York State Assembly; New York County, 11th District; 1922–1926	Succeeded by Maurice F. Cantor
Legal offices
New office	White House Counsel; 1943–1946	Succeeded by Clark Clifford
