= David C. Williams (inspector general) =

American government official (born 1947)

David Williams
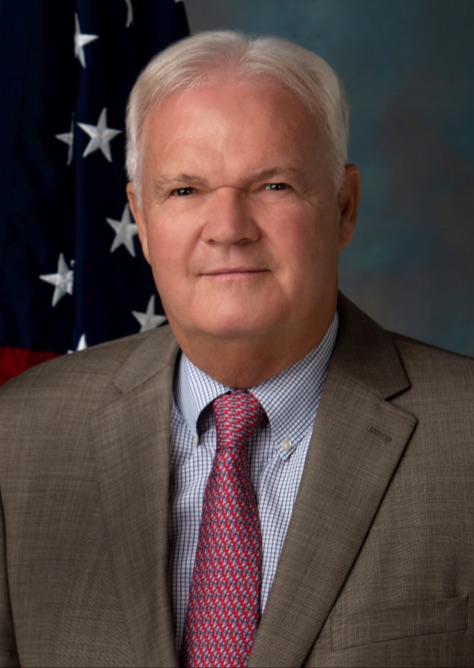
- Official portrait, 2018

Vice Chair of the Board of Governors of the United States Postal Service
- In office September 13, 2018 – April 30, 2020
- President: Donald Trump
- Preceded by: James Bilbray (2014)

Inspector General of the Postal Service
- In office August 20, 2003 – February 19, 2016
- President: George W. Bush; Barack Obama
- Preceded by: Karla Corcoran
- Succeeded by: Tammy Whitcomb

Inspector General of Department of Housing and Urban Development Acting
- In office July 16, 2001 – May 20, 2002
- President: George W. Bush
- Preceded by: James Heist (Acting)
- Succeeded by: Kenneth Donohue

Treasury Inspector General for Tax Administration
- In office May 17, 1999 – August 24, 2002
- President: Bill Clinton; George W. Bush
- Preceded by: Lawrence Rogers (Acting)
- Succeeded by: Pamela Gardiner (Acting)

Inspector General of the United States Department of the Treasury
- In office October 26, 1998 – May 17, 1999
- President: Bill Clinton
- Preceded by: Richard Calahan (Acting)
- Succeeded by: Lawrence Rogers (Acting)

Inspector General of the Social Security Administration
- In office January 4, 1996 – June 22, 1998
- President: Bill Clinton
- Preceded by: June Gibbs Brown
- Succeeded by: James Huse

Inspector General of the Nuclear Regulatory Commission
- In office November 22, 1989 – September 1, 1995
- President: George H. W. Bush; Bill Clinton
- Preceded by: Position established
- Succeeded by: Leo Norton (Acting)

Personal details
- Born: 1947 (age 78–79) Granite City, Illinois, U.S.
- Party: Independent
- Education: Southern Illinois University, Edwardsville (BA); University of Illinois, Urbana-Champaign (MA)

David C. Williams (born 1947) was the vice chairman of the Board of Governors of the United States Postal Service from September 13, 2018, to April 30, 2020, and served as Inspector General (IG) for the U.S. Postal Service, in the United States Postal Service Office of Inspector General, from 2003 to 2016.

== Career ==
Following a tour of military duty in Vietnam, Williams joined the United States Secret Service, and was assigned to President Ronald Reagan's Commission on Organized Crime, then led the Office of Special Investigations at the General Accounting Office (since renamed the Government Accountability Office), prior to his confirmation as Inspector General for various federal agencies, including the Social Security Administration, Department of the Treasury, Internal Revenue Service, Nuclear Regulatory Commission, and Department of Housing and Urban Development, as well as vice chair of the Government Accountability and Transparency Board.

After Securities and Exchange Commission (SEC) Assistant Inspector General David P. Weber alleged improper conduct by SEC Inspector General David Kotz in the investigation of the Bernie Madoff Ponzi scheme, Williams was brought in to conduct an independent, outside review of Kotz's alleged improper conduct in 2012. The Williams Report questioned Kotz's work on the Madoff investigation, because Kotz was a "very good friend" with Markopolos. Although investigators were not able to determine when Kotz and Markopolos became friends, the Report concluded that it would have violated U.S. ethics rules if their relationship began before or during Kotz's investigation of Madoff.

In June 2013, Williams criticized the Postal Service's real estate contract with CBRE, a multinational real estate company, citing "conflict of interest concerns."
