= Dorothy Rosenman =

American advocate for low-cost housing, and author

- Born: 1900 New York, New York
- Died: January 17, 1991 (aged 90–91) Manhattan, New York
- Spouse: Samuel Rosenman (until 1973)
- Children: 2

Dorothy Rosenman (1900 – 17 January 1991) was an expert on housing, a lifelong advocate for low-cost housing and an author.

== Early life and education ==
Rosenman was born Dorothy Ruben in New York City. She graduated from the Montessori Training School in 1918, while also attending Columbia University.

== Career ==
Rosenman worked to educate both the public and legislators about the need for community improvement and planning.

Rosenman's career in public housing began in the 1920s, when asked by Ira Robbins (chairman of the housing committee of the United Neighborhood Houses, to amend old tenement laws.

During the early years of World War II, Rosenman spent time in Washington, D.C., urging the United States War Department to release much-needed materials for emergency housing. She served as the chairman of the National Committee on the Housing Emergency.

Rosenman served on many committees throughout her career, including NYC Mayor Fiorello LaGuardia's Committee on Housing Legislation. She served as chairman and organizer of the National Committee on Housing, Inc., as chairman of the committee working to create a New York State Division of Housing, and as chairman of the Housing Committee of the United Neighborhood Houses of New York. The latter worked for better housing conditions on the Lower East Side of New York.

In addition to books, Rosenman wrote many magazine articles on housing.

== Personal life ==
Dorothy was married to Samuel Rosenman, a lawyer and Democratic speechwriter. The pair were working together on their book Presidential Style; after Samuel died, in 1973, the couple's editor, Cass Canfield, encouraged Dorothy to finish the book.

Dorothy and her husband had two sons.

== Publications ==
- Rosenman, Dorothy. A Million Homes a Year. Harcourt, Brace and Co., 1945.
- Rosenman, Dorothy. Needed: Five Million Homes. National Committee on Housing, 1945.
- Rosenman, Dorothy and Samuel Rosenman, Presidential Style: Some Giants and a Pygmy in the White House. Harper & Row, 1976.
