= William Golub =

American lawyer

William W. Golub (1915 – March 28, 1994) was an American lawyer with Rosenman & Colin who was an authority on public transportation and regulatory issues.

== Biography ==
Golub graduated from Columbia College in 1934, Phi Beta Kappa, and in 1937 from Columbia Law School. After graduating from law school, he served as a staff lawyer for the U.S. Attorney General's Commission on Administrative Procedure until 1939. He was a consultant to various Federal wartime agencies, including the Office of Price Administration.

During the 1950s, Golub was active in public transportation issues in the state of New York, by helping to reorganize the Long Island Rail Road and the Hudson & Manhattan Railroad. He was a consultant to the Nelson Rockefeller administration for rail commuter problems in the state and to the Moreland Act commission to draft legislation on overhauling the state's liquor laws.

In 1968, he was named a member of the governing council of the Administrative Conference of the United States. He joined the law firm Rosenman & Colin in 1969, specializing in securities and corporate mergers, and was named of counsel in 1987. In 1976, he was elected president of the Columbia College Alumni Association. He served as a trustee of Columbia University and received a John Jay Award in 1988.

Golub died on March 28, 1994, at Mount Sinai Medical Center at age 79.
