= Patrick P. O'Carroll =

American government official

Patrick O’Carroll
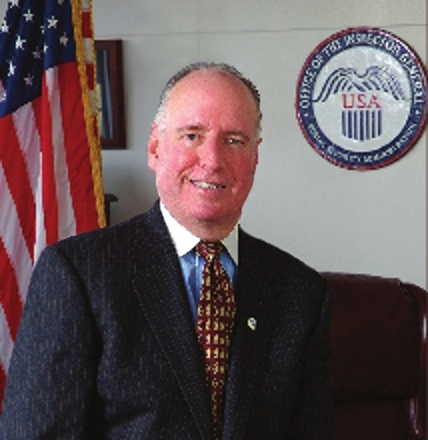

Inspector General of the Social Security Administration
- In office March 7, 2004 – May 29, 2016; Acting: March 7, 2004 – November 29, 2004
- President: George W. Bush; Barack Obama
- Preceded by: James Huse
- Succeeded by: Gale Stallworth Stone (Acting)

Personal details
- Education: Mount St. Mary's University (BS); George Washington University (MS)

Patrick P. O'Carroll Jr. was the third Inspector General for the Social Security Administration of the United States of America, serving from November 24, 2004, to May 31, 2016.

== About the position ==
The Office of the Inspector General conducts independent and objective audits and investigations within the Social Security Administration's programs. About $300 million per year is investigated by the Social Security Administration, returning about $50 for every dollar invested in its operations. The Service employs over 600 auditors, attorneys, evaluators and investigators.

O'Carroll directed an OIG workforce of 530 auditors, attorneys, investigators, and support personnel nationwide. The results of his efforts can be seen in OIG's most recent achievements. In Fiscal Year 2015, OIG's investigators reported over $700 million in investigative accomplishments through SSA recoveries, restitution, fines, settlements, judgments, and projected savings. In addition, OIG's auditors issued 89 reports with recommendations identifying more than $3 billion in Federal funds, which could be put to better use, and over $4 billion in questioned costs. In addition, OIG's attorneys reported over $17 million in civil monetary penalties and assessments.

== Personal background ==
O'Carroll chairs the Investigations Committee of the President's Council on Integrity and Efficiency (PCIE), which monitors the functions and training of over 6,000 agents in the Federal IG community.

Prior to his appointment as Inspector General, O'Carroll held other positions in the SSA OIG organization, including Assistant Inspector General for Investigations and Assistant Inspector General for External Affairs.

O'Carroll also worked for 26 years with the United States Secret Service. He worked in the Newark, New Jersey and New York City field offices as both an agent and supervisor. O'Carroll served protective assignments for Presidents Jimmy Carter, Ronald Reagan, George H.W. Bush, and Bill Clinton. As the Assistant Special Agent-in-Charge of the Counterterrorism Section, he coordinated Secret Service participation in the first World Trade Center bombing investigation, the attempted assassination of former President George H.W. Bush by Saddam Hussein, and an assassination plot against President Hosni Mubarak of Egypt. O'Carroll also supervised investigations involving an airplane crash and shootings at the White House, and coordinated the Secret Service's participation in the Oklahoma City bombing investigation and prosecution.

== Education ==
O'Carroll received a B.S. from Mount Saint Mary's College in Emmitsburg, Maryland, and a Master of Forensic Sciences from the George Washington University, Washington, D.C. He also attended the National Cryptologic School and the Kennedy School at Harvard University.

== Memberships and associations ==
O'Carroll is a member of the International Association of Chiefs of Police and the Association of Government Accountants. In 2015, O'Carroll was elected as a fellow of the National Academy of Public Administration.

== Further background ==
- In 2003, O'Carroll received the Presidential Rank Award for Meritorious Executive.
- O'Carroll is third generation American, his roots being from Kilkenny in Ireland.
