= Rosenman & Colin =

American law firm

Rosenman & Colin LLP
- Headquarters: New York City
- No. of attorneys: 275 (2002)
- Major practice areas: real estate
- Date founded: 1912
- Company type: Limited liability partnership
- Dissolved: 2002 (merger)

Rosenman & Colin LLP was a New York City-based law firm that practiced from 1912 to 2002, at which point the firm merged with Chicago-based Katten Muchin Zavis to form Katten Muchin Rosenman. The firm previously practiced under the name Rosenman, Colin, Freund, Lewis & Cohen.

== History ==
The firm was established in 1912, under the name Rosenberg & Ball. As of 1979, the firm was known as Rosenman, Colin, Freund, Lewis & Cohen.

In the 1980s, it had one of the largest real estate practices among U.S. law firms.

In 1986, when top New York City law firms raised the starting salaries of new associates from $54,000 to $66,000, the firm initially refused to follow suit; months later, however, it fell in line with the other New York City law firms.

Rosenman & Colin was well known for its estate and trust planning and administration, real estate, intellectual property and litigation practices. These practice areas have been influential in all aspects of New York City's legal arenas over the years.

Rosenman & Colin numbered some 275 attorneys when it merged with Katten Muchin Zavis in 2002, with offices in New York, Washington, DC, and Charlotte, North Carolina.

== Notable alumni ==
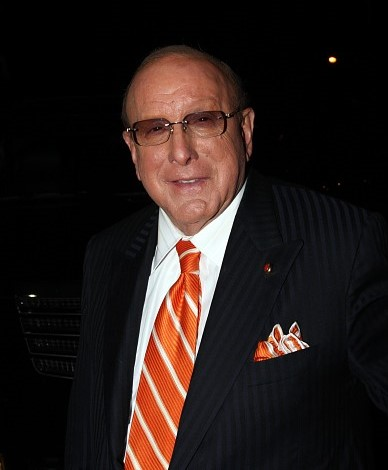
Clive Davis

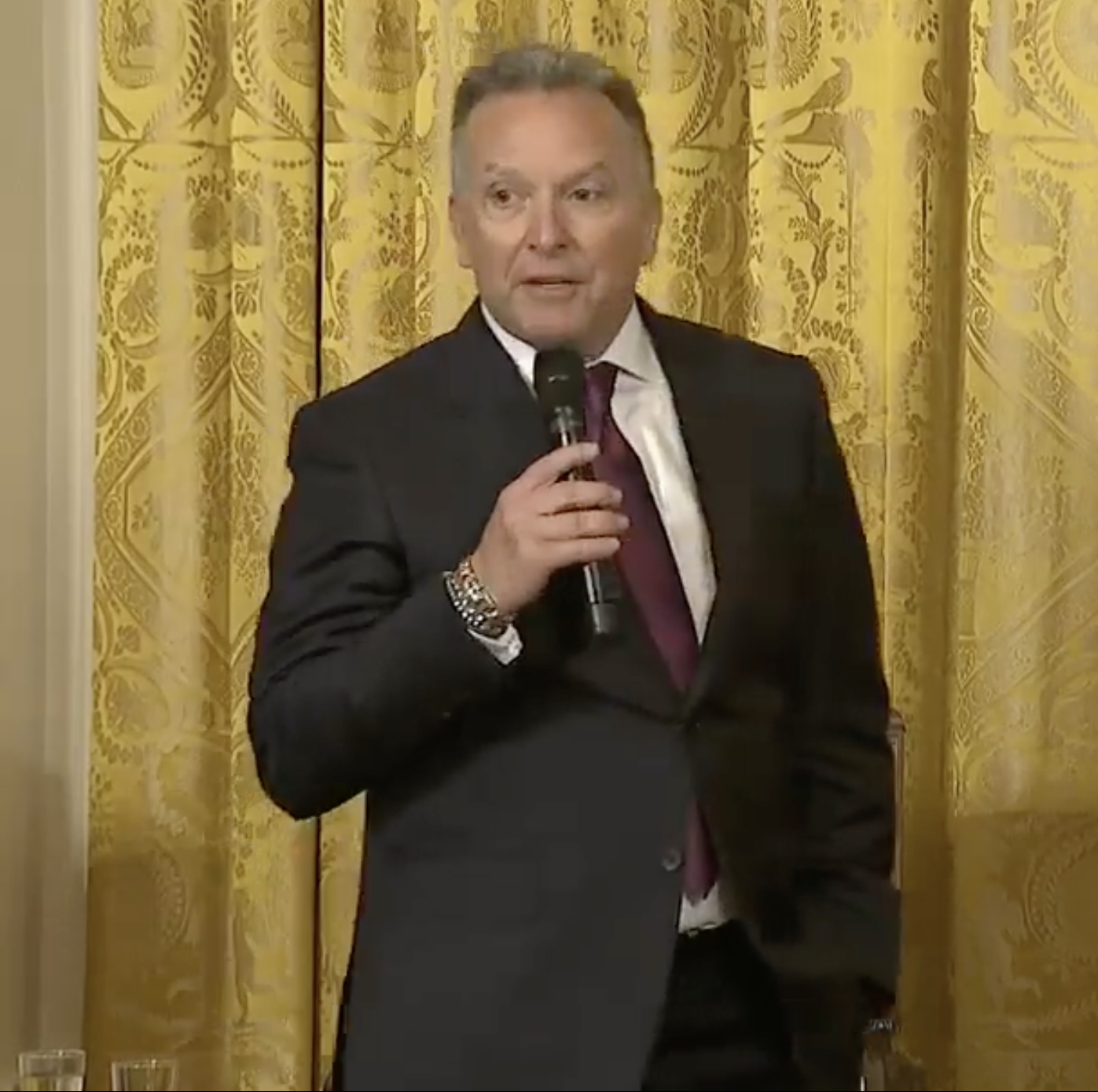
Steve Witkoff

- Clive Davis (born 1932) – music mogul, record producer, record executive, and lawyer; won five Grammy Awards; inducted into the Rock and Roll Hall of Fame; president of Columbia Records; founder and president of Arista Records; chair and CEO of the RCA Music Group, of J Records, and of BMG North America.
- Marc Stuart Dreier (born 1950) – former litigator and convicted Ponzi scheme swindler
- Maria Echaveste (born 1954) – Senior adviser to President Bill Clinton
- William Golub (1915–1994) – lawyer and advisor to Nelson Rockefeller
- David G. Greenfield (born 1978) – NYC Councilman, CEO of the Metropolitan Council on Jewish Poverty
- Charles J. O'Byrne (born 1959) – Secretary to the Governor of the State of New York
- Albert Podell (1937–2023) – magazine editor and writer, advertising executive, trial attorney, and documentary film producer and director
- Michel Rosenfeld – Benjamin N. Cardozo School of Law professor
- Samuel Rosenman (1896–1973) – Founder, White House Counsel, president of the New York City Bar Association
- Leonard B. Sand (1928–2016) – judge of the U.S. District Court for the Southern District of New York
- Steve Witkoff (born 1957) – Special Envoy to the Middle East for U.S. President Donald Trump; real estate investor and developer, founder of the Witkoff Group, attorney
- Walter Yetnikoff (1933–2021) – music industry executive, president of CBS Records International, then president and CEO of CBS Records
