= Janet Rehnquist =

American government official

Inspector General of the United States Department of Health and Human Services
- In office August 8, 2001 – June 1, 2003
- President: George W. Bush
- Preceded by: June Gibbs Brown
- Succeeded by: Daniel R. Levinson

Personal details
- Born: May 4, 1957 (age 68)
- Party: Republican
- Education: University of Virginia (BA, JD)

Janet Rehnquist (born May 4, 1957) is a former inspector general of the United States Department of Health and Human Services (H.H.S.), a prominent Republican, and the daughter of former Chief Justice William Rehnquist.

== Resignation and controversy ==
While the Inspector General Act of 1978 requires that an I.G. is selected based upon their qualifications and not their political affiliation, those appointed by the president are often considered political appointees and may also be selected because of their political relationships and party affiliation. Rehnquist's job was to investigate fraud, waste and abuse at H.H.S., including Medicare fraud. During her term, CBS News obtained documents showing that Governor Jeb Bush's chief of staff, Kathleen Shanahan, had left Janet Rehnquist an urgent message and asked her to put off an audit into an alleged $571 million overpayment to the State of Florida, which was discovered in 2002. Rehnquist quickly ordered a two-week delay of the audit. Two weeks stretched into five months, after which Rehnquist ordered her audit team to "proceed with (an) audit in North Carolina first, then do Florida." This put the audit well after Jeb Bush's election. It is alleged that Rehnquist then tried to halt an investigation by Congress.

In March 2003, after Congress had begun an investigation into the matter, Rehnquist resigned stating that she wanted to spend more time with her family.

== Other sources ==
- "Pension fund probe urged." Miami Herald Mar 14, 2003.
- "Janet Rehnquist, the embattled inspector general of the Department of...." Medical Marketing & Media, Apr 1, 2003.
- "Report Cites HHS IG's 'Failures'; U.S. Won't Charge Janet Rehnquist." Washington Post, Apr 13, 2003. Start Page: A.06
- Lee, Christopher, "GAO Cites Janet Rehnquist's Lapses; Former HHS Official Created Atmosphere of 'Distrust,' Report Says." Washington Post, June 11, 2003.
