= Carl Hoecker =

SEC Inspector General

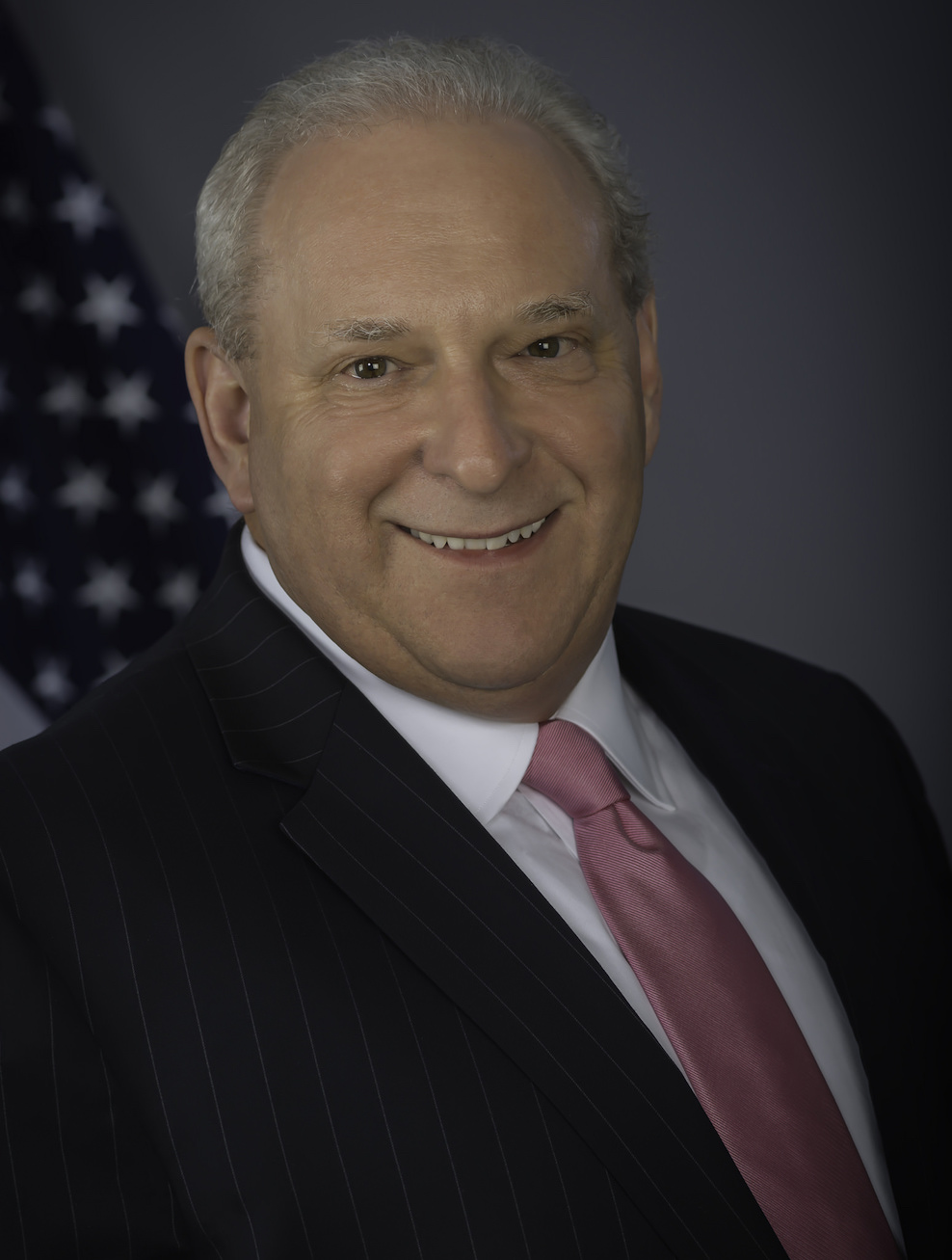

Inspector General of the Securities and Exchange Commission
- Incumbent
- Assumed office February 11, 2013
- President: Barack Obama; Donald Trump; Joe Biden
- Preceded by: Jon Rymer (Acting)

Inspector General of the Capitol Police
- In office July 10, 2006 – February 11, 2013
- President: George W. Bush; Barack Obama
- Preceded by: Position established
- Succeeded by: Fay Ropella

Personal details
- Education: Governors State University (BA); University of Southern California (MA)

Carl W. Hoecker is the Inspector General of the U.S. Securities and Exchange Commission (SEC). He has over 30 years experience as a criminal investigator and is also a certified public accountant and certified fraud examiner.

== Education ==
Hoecker received a B.A. in Business Administration from Governors State University, and an M.A. in Systems Management from the University of Southern California.

== Early career ==
Hoecker was a U.S. military policeman in 1976, a special agent in the Army Criminal Investigations Command, a criminal investigator of the U.S. Information Agency (now part of the State Department), and Deputy Inspector General for Investigations from 2003 to 2006 at the Treasury Office of the Inspector General.

Beginning in 2006, Hoecker was United States Capitol Police Inspector General. He is also the current chairman of the investigations committee of the Council of Inspectors General on Integrity and Efficiency (CIGIE).

== SEC ==
Hoecker is the third Inspector General of the SEC. Allison Lerner, the National Science Foundation inspector general, said "I believe his skills as an investigator and a CPA will combine to make him an outstanding inspector general at the Securities and Exchange Commission".

He replaced Jon Rymer, the Federal Deposit Insurance Corporation's inspector general, who temporarily served as the SEC's interim inspector general.
