= Earl Devaney =

US government official (1947–2022)

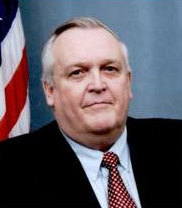

Chair of the Recovery Accountability and Transparency Board
- In office February 23, 2009 – December 31, 2011
- President: Barack Obama
- Preceded by: Position established
- Succeeded by: Kathleen Tighe

Inspector General of the Department of the Interior
- In office August 5, 1999 – December 31, 2011; On leave: February 23, 2009 – December 31, 2011
- President: Bill Clinton; George W. Bush; Barack Obama
- Preceded by: Robert Williams (Acting)
- Succeeded by: Mary Kendall (Acting)

Personal details
- Born: June 8, 1947 Reading, Massachusetts, U.S.
- Died: April 15, 2022 (aged 74) Boca Raton, Florida, U.S.
- Education: Franklin & Marshall College (BA)

Earl Edward Devaney (June 8, 1947 – April 15, 2022) was an American government official who served as inspector general for the United States Department of the Interior and chairman of the Recovery Accountability and Transparency Board.

== Early life and education ==
Devaney was born in Reading, Massachusetts on June 8, 1947. His father was the owner of several businesses; his mother worked as an actress and model. Devaney began his career in law enforcement in 1968 as a Massachusetts police officer. He attended Franklin & Marshall College, on whose football team he was an offensive lineman. He earned a Bachelor of Arts degree in government in 1970.

== Career ==
=== U.S. Secret Service ===
After graduating from college, Devaney became a special agent with the United States Secret Service. Devaney served as the special agent in charge of the Fraud Division until his retirement from the Secret Service in 1991, by which time he had gained international recognition as an expert on white-collar crime, and was frequently sought by major media organizations. He received five U.S. Department of Treasury Special Achievement Awards during his term of office with the Secret Service, as well as numerous honors and awards from several professional organizations.

=== Environmental Protection Agency ===
Upon leaving the Secret Service, Devaney became the director of the Office of Enforcement and Compliance Assurance in the United States Environmental Protection Agency. In this position, he oversaw all of EPA's criminal investigators and assumed management responsibility for EPA's Forensics Service Center [NEIC] and the National Enforcement Training Institute. His years of managerial excellence were honored with a Presidential Rank Award in 1998.

=== Department of Interior ===
During his tenure at the Department of the Interior, Devaney helped to investigate disgraced ex-lobbyist Jack Abramoff, oversaw the criminal conviction of the Deputy Secretary J. Steven Griles which ultimately led to the resignation of Secretary Gale Norton. Devaney also investigated Julie A. MacDonald, deputy assistant secretary who had been appointed by Norton in 2002. MacDonald also resigned after Devaney found that she had violated federal rules by giving government documents to industry lobbyists. Because of Devaney's findings, the United States Fish and Wildlife Service ordered the review of eight endangered species decisions in which MacDonald was involved. Devaney called MacDonald's management "abrupt and abrasive, if not abusive," and U.S. Senator Ron Wyden, who commissioned the report, attributed the "untold waste of hundreds of thousands of taxpayers' dollars" to MacDonald's actions.

In 2008, Devaney investigated allegations of wrongdoing by a dozen current and former employees of the United States Minerals Management Service, and found that "a culture of ethical failure" pervaded the agency. Devaney's investigation found that eight officials accepted gifts from energy companies, whose value exceeded limits set by ethics rules. The investigation also concluded that several of the officials "frequently consumed alcohol at industry functions, had used cocaine and marijuana, and had sexual relationships with oil and gas company representatives." According to The New York Times, "The reports portray a dysfunctional organization that has been riddled with conflicts of interest, unprofessional behavior and a free-for-all atmosphere for much of the Bush administration’s watch."

=== Recovery Accountability and Transparency Board ===
In February 2009, President Barack Obama announced his choice of Devaney to be the chairman of the Recovery and Accountability Board to oversee the $787 billion American Recovery and Reinvestment Act of 2009. He retired from federal service in December 2011. He subsequently served on several corporate and non-profit boards.

== Personal life ==
Devaney was married to Judith Levay for 49 years until his death. They had two sons: Matthew and Michael. He and his wife relocated to Fort Lauderdale in his retirement. Devaney died on April 15, 2022, at a hospital in Boca Raton, Florida, aged 74, from heart disease.
