= Malcolm Sparrow =

British academic

Malcolm K. Sparrow is a British academic. He is Professor of the Practice of Public Management at the John F. Kennedy School of Government at Harvard University. He is the faculty chair of the school’s executive program “Strategic Management of Regulatory and Enforcement Agencies.”

== Early life and education ==
In 1977, Sparrow received a Bachelor of Arts in mathematics from Trinity College, Cambridge (1977), a Master of Arts in mathematics from the University of Cambridge (1981), a Master of Public Administration from the Harvard Kennedy School (1986), and a Doctor of Philosophy in applied mathematics from the University of Kent (1986).

== Police career ==
In 1977, Sparrow joined the British Police Service. He served for ten years, rising to the rank of Detective Chief Inspector. He was the head of the Kent County Constabulary Fraud Squad. He conducted internal affairs investigations and commanded a tactical firearms unit.

In 1988, he left the police to take up a faculty appointment at Harvard.

In his book License to Steal, Sparrow estimated that billing fraud in the health insurance industry contributed at least $100 billion of healthcare expenditures in the year 2000; he suggested that it might be as high as $300 billion, 23% of the total expenses.

== Books ==
- Fundamentals of Regulatory Design (Kindle Direct Publishing, 2020)
- Handcuffed: What Holds Policing Back & the Keys to Reform (Brookings Press, 2016)
- The Character of Harms: Operational Challenges in Control (Cambridge University Press, 2008)
- The Regulatory Craft: Controlling Risks, Solving Problems, and Managing Compliance (Brookings Press, 2000)
- License to Steal: How Fraud Bleeds America's Health Care System (Westview Press, 2000)
- Imposing Duties: Government's Changing Approach to Compliance (Praeger Books, 1994)
- with Mark H. Moore and David M. Kennedy Beyond 911: A New Era for Policing (Basic Books, 1990)
- with Mark H. Moore Ethics in Government: The Moral Challenge of Public Leadership (Prentice-Hall, 1990)
