= Fred Weiderhold =

Inspector General of Amtrak
- In office April 3, 1989 – June 17, 2009
- President: George H. W. Bush; Bill Clinton; George W. Bush; Barack Obama
- Preceded by: Position established
- Succeeded by: Lorraine Green (Acting)

Personal details
- Education: United States Military Academy (BS)

Fred Weiderhold is the former Inspector General of Amtrak and was a 35-year veteran of the agency. He was appointed as the first Inspector General at Amtrak by former Amtrak Chairman, W. Graham Claytor, Jr. in April 1989. Prior to serving as Inspector General, he had held numerous senior positions at Amtrak spanning a 15-year career.

In June 2009 Weiderhold resigned from his post after a significant conflict with Amtrak's CEO and Board.

Weiderhold conducted major investigations during his 20-year career as Inspector General including potential design defects and contract modifications for the $600 million Northeast Rail Electrification Project (NHRIP) in 2000, obtaining substantial civil settlements from several contractors In another investigation involving Amtrak train crews, he found that "at least $1.4 million has been stolen from Amtrak by conductors and assistant conductors" between 1999 and 2001. Of the 1,200 conductors and assistant conductors, 110 conductors were fired and 20 resigned following the investigation. Weiderhold testified before Congress about failed brake issues on the high speed Acela trains in 2005 following the cancellation of all Acela services by then-Amtrak President David Gunn.

During his tenure, the Amtrak OIG also conducted major audits of Amtrak's operations and programs. One of the largest audit findings and recoveries involved the procurement of new long-distance, bi-level passenger rail cars. The OIG audit cost questioned and recovered over $380 million from the audit. Later equipment procurement contracting was substantially revised following numerous audit recommendations.

Shortly after terrorist attack on rail systems in Russia and the March 2004 attacks in Madrid, Spain, Weiderhold worked with Amtrak's General Counsel in working with the Department of Homeland Security Transportation Security Administration in drafting the first security guidelines for the rail passenger industry.

Following a series of investigations and disagreements regarding Weiderhold's behavior and OIG independence with Amtrak's Board of Directors, Weiderhold resigned his post in June 2009, the third Inspector General to leave prematurely since the 2008 presidential election. Weiderhold's departure was later investigated by the House Committee on Government Operations, with findings issued by Chairman Darrell Issa and Senator Chuck Grassley. AMTRAK had executed a standard severance agreement that limited what all parties could say about the circumstances of his departure. While this severance agreement was standard for Amtrak executives, some reviewers questioned its applicability to the Inspector General.

A subsequent investigation by the US Department of Transportation OIG concluded that the Amtrak Board's actions did not violate the Inspector General Act. Further, based on the results of this investigation, Senator John D. Rockefeller IV, Chairman of the US Senate Committee on Commerce, Science, and Transportation, concluded that the earlier findings issued by Issa and Grassley were "flawed" and contained "troubling errors and omissions".

Since leaving Amtrak, Weiderhold has served as a rail safety and security expert. He also founded Paladin Consulting to advise rail and transit clients on major capital projects and high-speed rail systems.
