= Robert Storch =

American lawyer

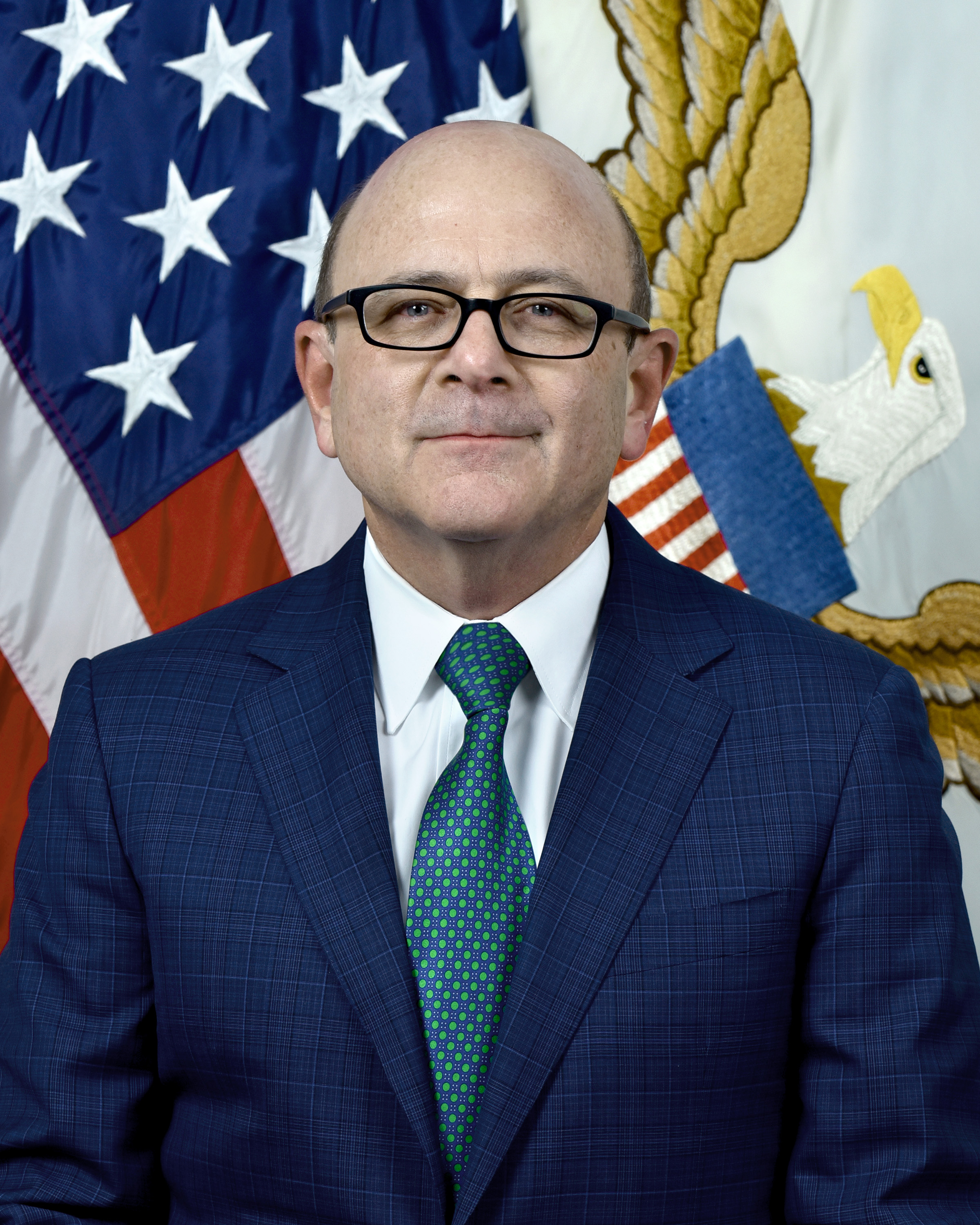

Inspector General of the State of Delaware
- Incumbent
- Assumed office May 8, 2026
- Governor: Matt Meyer
- Preceded by: Newly established

Inspector General of the United States Department of Defense
- In office December 6, 2022 – January 24, 2025
- President: Joe Biden; Donald Trump
- Preceded by: Jon T. Rymer (2016)
- Succeeded by: Platte Moring

Inspector General of the National Security Agency
- In office January 2, 2018 – December 6, 2022
- President: Donald Trump; Joe Biden
- Preceded by: Russell Decker (acting)

Personal details
- Education: Harvard University (BA); Columbia University (JD)

Robert Phillip Storch is an American lawyer and government official. Since May 8, 2026, he has served as the Inspector General of the State of Delaware, a newly established office. He previously served as the inspector general in the United States Department of Defense from 2022 to January 2025 and the inspector general of the National Security Agency from 2018 to 2022.

== Education ==
Storch earned a Bachelor of Arts degree from Harvard University in 1982 and a Juris Doctor from Columbia Law School in 1986.

== Career ==
After law school, he clerked for William Duffy Keller of the Central District of California. From 1995 to 2012, Storch worked in the U.S. Attorney's Office for the Northern District of New York, where he served as deputy criminal chief and counsel to the U.S. attorney. He was a DOJ Resident Legal Advisor in Ukraine from 2007 to 2009. Storch has also served as chief of the Appellate Division and senior litigation counsel, as the District of Columbia's Anti-Terrorism coordinator, at the Public Integrity Section of the United States Department of Justice Criminal Division. He also served as an assistant U.S. attorney in the Middle District of Florida and worked as an associate at Covington & Burling. He was previously the deputy inspector general at the United States Department of Justice, the DOJ Office of the Inspector General Whistleblower Ombudsperson, and chairman of the Council of the Inspectors General on Integrity and Efficiency Whistleblower Ombudsman Working Group.

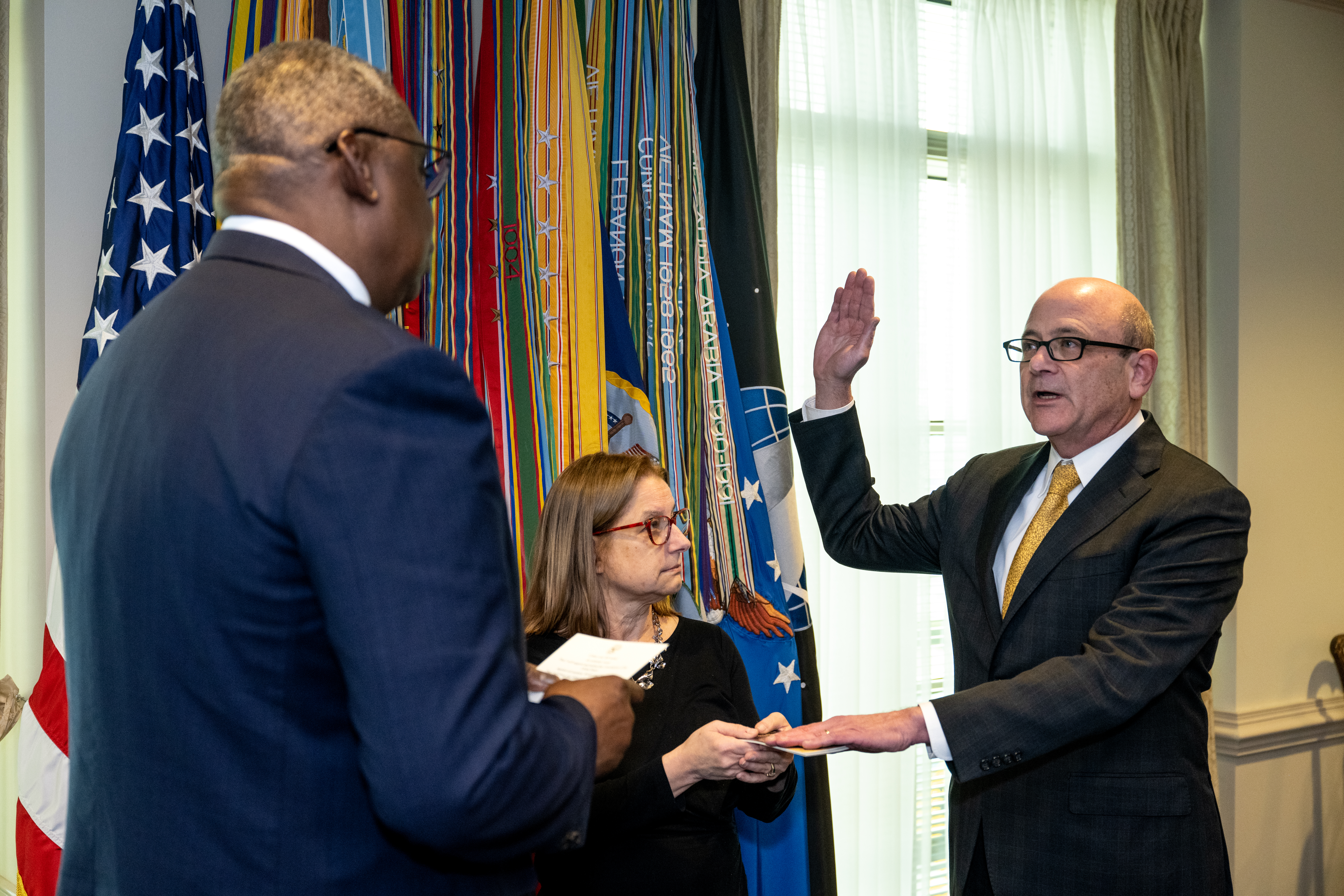
Secretary of Defense Lloyd J. Austin III administers the oath of office to Robert P. Storch, the Department of Defense's new Inspector General, at the Pentagon Washington, D.C., Dec. 14, 2022

Storch was nominated by President Obama in November 2016 and in January 2017 to become Inspector General of the National Security Agency and renominated for the position by President Trump on June 19, 2017. The Senate confirmed Storch's nomination on December 21, 2017. He assumed the role on January 2, 2018, and resigned on December 6, 2022.

Storch was nominated by President Biden in November 2021 to become Inspector General of the Department of Defense, a position for which no nominee had received Senate confirmation since 2016. The Senate confirmed the nomination on November 30, 2022, in a 92–3 vote. Storch assumed the role on December 6, 2022.

On January 24, 2025, he was fired by President Donald Trump along with several other inspectors general; the legality of the firing remains in question.

In May 2026, Storch was nominated by Delaware Governor Matt Meyer to become the first Inspector General of the State of Delaware. He was sworn into office after being confirmed by the Delaware Senate.
