= U.S. Department of Housing and Urban Development, Office of Inspector General =

- Formed: 1978
- Headquarters: Washington, D.C.
- Parent agency: U.S. Department of Housing and Urban Development
- Inspector General: Brian Harrison (Acting)
- Website: www.hudoig.gov

The U.S. Department of Housing and Urban Development Office of Inspector General (HUD OIG) is one of the Inspector General offices created by the Inspector General Act of 1978. The Inspector General for the Department of Housing and Urban Development is charged with investigating and auditing department programs to combat waste, fraud, and abuse.

== History of Inspectors General ==
Inspector General	Appointment Date
Brian Harrison (Acting)	August 14, 2025
Stephen M. Begg (Acting)	January 24, 2025
Rae Oliver Davis	January 23, 2019
Helen M. Albert (Acting)	June 30, 2017
David A. Montoya	December 1, 2011
Michael P. Stephens (Acting)	October 2010
Kenneth Donohue	May 20, 2002
David C. Williams (Acting)	July 16, 2001
James Heist (Acting Deputy)	June 4, 2001
Susan Gaffney	August 6, 1993
John J. Connors (Deputy)	March 1, 1992
Paul A. Adams (Deputy)	February 4, 1985
Charles L. Dempsey	June 14, 1983
Paul A. Adams (Deputy)	February 25, 1983
Charles L. Dempsey	August 5, 1981
Paul A. Adams (Deputy)	January 21, 1981
Charles L. Dempsey	July 9, 1979
Charles L. Dempsey	July 2, 1978
Charles L. Dempsey	October 1, 1977
James B. Thomas Jr.	August 31, 1975
Charles L. Dempsey	May 24, 1975
Charles G. Haynes	January 31, 1972
