= Eric Thorson =

American government official

Inspector General of the Department of the Treasury
- In office August 12, 2008 – June 30, 2019
- President: George W. Bush; Barack Obama; Donald Trump
- Preceded by: Dennis Schindel (Acting)
- Succeeded by: Rich Delmar (Acting)

Inspector General of the Small Business Administration
- In office April 2006 – August 12, 2008
- President: George W. Bush
- Preceded by: Peter McClintock (Acting)
- Succeeded by: Peter McClintock (Acting)

Personal details
- Education: United States Air Force Academy (BS)

Eric M. Thorson is a former American government official who served as Inspector General for the United States Treasury Department.

== Career ==
- Thorson is a graduate of the United States Air Force Academy.
- He served in the Department of the Air Force as Acting Assistant Secretary and twice as Deputy Assistant Secretary.
- Special Assistant to the Senate Republican Leader, Chief Investigator for the Senate Finance Committee and Chief Investigator for the Senate Permanent Subcommittee on Investigations.
- Office of Personnel Management (worked as a senior advisor to the Director for Investigative Operations and Agency Planning)
- Inspector General for the Small Business Administration.

== Inspector General of the Treasury ==
Thorson was nominated to be Inspector General of the Department of the Treasury by President George W. Bush on November 15, 2007, and confirmed by the United States Senate on August 1, 2008. He was sworn into office on August 12, 2008. He retired in June 2019 and was replaced by Acting Inspector General Richard K. Delmar.
