= Chairman of the Board of Veterans' Appeals =

- Agency Seal

- Personal flag of the assistant secretary of veterans affairs, of which the chairman ranks as

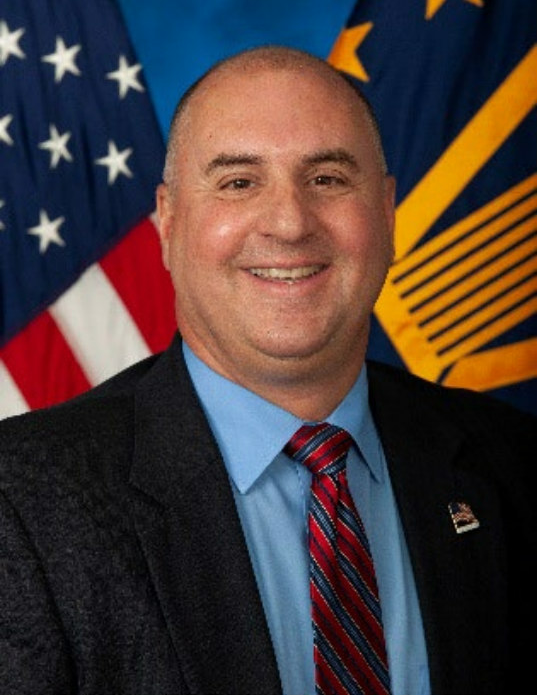
- Incumbent; Kenneth A. Arnold, Vice Chairman; Acting since January 15, 2025
- Board of Veterans Appeals
- Style: Chairman (informal); The Honorable (formal)
- Reports to: Secretary of Veterans Affairs
- Seat: Washington, D.C.
- Appointer: The president; with Senate advice and consent
- Term length: 6 years; No restriction on renewal
- Constituting instrument: Sec 4001 of Pub. L. 85–857, H.R. 9700, 72 Stat. 1241, enacted September 2, 1958, as amended
- Deputy: Vice Chairman
- Salary: Executive Schedule, Level IV $176,300 USD (January 2022)
- Website: https://www.bva.va.gov

The chairman of the Board of Veterans' Appeals is a senior position within the United States Department of Veterans Affairs that is responsible for the operation and policies of the Board of Veterans' Appeals, which is the administrative tribunal within the department responsible for holding hearings and issuing decisions on behalf of the Secretary regarding veterans' claims for benefits and services.

The chairman ranks equivalent to a department Assistant Secretary and is nominated by the President and confirmed by the Senate for a six-year term, must be appointed as a Veterans Law Judge, and must be a licensed attorney in good standing in a state or territory.

The current official performing chairman duties is Kenneth Arnold, the Board's Vice Chairman. The most recent confirmed Chairman was Jaime Areizaga-Soto of Virginia, who was nominated by President Joe Biden on April 25, 2022 and confirmed by the Senate on August 4, 2022. Although his term was not set to expire until 2028, he submitted his resignation on January 15, 2025, citing his mobilization for a two-year active-duty tour, leaving the Second Trump administration to name his successor. On August 1, 2025, President Trump nominated Terrance Gorman, of Florida as Areizaga-Soto's replacement, however, his nomination was withdrawn without explanation a month later.

On June 1, 2026, President Trump nominated Maria Chapa Lopez for the position.

== History ==
Beginning in 2011 and continuing up until the appointment of Chairman Mason in 2017 as the 10th Chairman and 4th politically appointed Chairman, the Board was led by several leaders appointed as the Board's Vice Chairman, which is appointed by the Secretary of VA. Although President Obama nominated former Chief Veterans Law Judge Constance B. Tobias to replace the retired James P. Terry. in the second session (2012) of the 112th Congress, as well as both the 1st (2013) and 2nd (2014) sessions of the 113th Congress, the Senate never acted on her nomination beyond a Senate Veterans Affairs Committee confirmation hearing in November 2013, and her nominations were returned to the President at the end of each session.

Chairman name	Assumed office	Left office	Appointed by	Agency executive (Note: From 1934 through 1989, the Board was a part of the Veterans Administration, an independent executive agency, which was led by an administrator of the Veterans Administration. After the passage of the Department of Veterans Affairs Act of 1988 (Pub. L. 100–527, H.R. 3471, 102 Stat. 2637, enacted October 25, 1988), the administrator became the Secretary of Veterans Affairs.)
John G. Pollard	1934	1937	Franklin D. Roosevelt	Frank T. Hines
Robert L. Jarnagin	1937	1957	Franklin D. Roosevelt Franklin D. Roosevelt; Harry S. Truman; Dwight D. Eisenhower	Frank T. Hines Omar Bradley; Carl R. Gray Jr. Harvey V. Higley
James W. Stancil	1957	1971	Dwight D. Eisenhower; John F. Kennedy; Lyndon B. Johnson; Richard Nixon	Sumner G. Whittier; John S. Gleason Jr. William J. Driver; Donald E. Johnson
Lawrence R. Pierce, Jr.	1971	1974	Richard Nixon	Donald E. Johnson
Sydney J. Shuman	1974	1981	Gerald Ford; Jimmy Carter	Richard L. Roudebush; Max Cleland
Kenneth E. Eaton	1982	1991	Ronald Reagan; George H. W. Bush	Robert Nimmo; Harry N. Walters; Thomas K. Turnage; Edward Derwinski
Charles Cragin	March 1991	March 1997	George H. W. Bush; Bill Clinton	Ed Derwinski Jesse Brown
Eligah D. Clark	November 1998	November 2004	Bill Clinton; George W. Bush	Togo D. West, Jr. Anthony Principi
James P. Terry	July 2005	February 2011	George W. Bush; Barack Obama	Jim Nicholson; James Peake; Eric Shinseki
Steven L. Keller Vice Chairman /Executive in Charge (Note: During this period, the secretary designated the vice chairman to perform the duties of the chairman, while there was the absence of a Senate-confirmed nominee. The person performing those duties were given the title Executive in Charge.)	February 2011	June 2013	Barack Obama	Eric Shinseki
Laura H. Eskenazi Vice Chairman / Executive in Charge	June 2013	July 2016	Barack Obama	Eric Shinseki Bob McDonald
Carol A. DiBattiste Vice Chairman / Executive in Charge	August 2016	January 2017	Barack Obama	Bob McDonald
David C. Spickler Vice Chairman / Executive in Charge	February 2017	October 2017	Donald Trump	David Shulkin
Cheryl L. Mason	November 8, 2017	August 4, 2022	Donald Trump; Joe Biden	David Shulkin; Robert Wilkie; Denis McDonough
Kenneth A. Arnold Vice Chairman / Acting Chairman (Note: Named Acting Chairman in August 2022, pending the swearing-in of General Areizaga-Soto.)	August 4, 2022	September 15, 2022	Joe Biden	Denis McDonough
Jaime Areizaga-Soto	September 15, 2022	January 15, 2025	Joe Biden	Denis McDonough
Kenneth A. Arnold Vice Chairman (Note: De-facto chairman upon the resignation of Chairman Areizaga-Soto on January 13, 2025)	January 15, 2025	Incumbent	Donald Trump	Doug Collins
