= List of people from Portsmouth, Ohio =

This is a list of people who were born in, lived in, or are closely associated with the city of Portsmouth, Ohio.

== Athletics ==
- Dale Bandy, Ohio University basketball coach
- Al Bridwell, former Major League Baseball player
- Gerald Cadogan, former professional football player
- Chuck Ealey, former football player for University of Toledo, and others
- Larry Hisle, former Major League Baseball player, currently employed with Milwaukee Brewers organization
- Rocky Nelson, former Major League Baseball player
- Josh Newman, Major League Baseball pitcher
- Al Oliver, former Major League Baseball player
- Del Rice, former Major League Baseball player
- Branch Rickey, baseball executive, signed Jackie Robinson to the Brooklyn Dodgers
- Adam Stevens, 2-time champion crew chief with Kyle Busch in the NASCAR Cup Series
- Gene Tenace, former Major League Baseball player

== Arts and entertainment ==
- Kathleen Battle, opera singer
- Earl Thomas Conley, country music singer and songwriter
- Martin Dillon, musician and operatic tenor
- Bil Dwyer, cartoonist (Dumb Dora) and humorist
- Steve Free, ASCAP Award-winning Appalachian musician
- Liza Johnson, film director
- Serena B. Miller, author
- Jeff Munn, Vice President of operations for Harlem Globetrotters
- Wally Phillips, longtime Chicago radio personality
- Barbara Robinson, author
- Herb Roe, mural artist
- Roy Rogers, singer and cowboy movie star
- Cheryl Shuman, media personality strategic political and media strategist
- Stuff Smith, jazz musician

== Education, politics and service ==
- James Mitchell Ashley, drafter of the Thirteenth Amendment to the United States Constitution
- Henry T. Bannon, U.S. representative from Portsmouth (1901–1905), attorney, author, and historian
- Emma M. Cramer, member of the Ohio House of Representatives
- Mary A. G. Dight, physician
- Bill Harsha, Ohio politician for the United States House of Representatives
- Chase Wilmot Kennedy, U.S. Army major general
- Wells A. Hutchins, U.S. representative from Portsmouth (1883–1885), attorney
- Elza Jeffords, U.S. representative from Mississippi (1883–1885)
- Chase Wilmot Kennedy, U.S. Army major general
- Charles Kinney, Jr. - Ohio Secretary of State (1897–1901)
- Raphael Lasker, rabbi
- Cheryl L. Mason, Chairman, Board of Veterans' Appeals, US Department of Veterans' Affairs (2017-2022), Inspector General, US Department of Veterans’ Affairs (Incumbent)
- Max Raisin, rabbi
- Ted Strickland, former Ohio governor
