= Carl Gray =

Carl Gray may refer to:

- Carl Raymond Gray (1867–1939), American railroad executive
- Carl R. Gray Jr. (1889–1955), United States Army general
- USS Carl R. Gray, U.S. Navy tugboat
