= Troop transport =

Troop transport may be:

- Troopship
- Military Railway Service (United States)
- Military transport aircraft
