= Fred Wampler =

Fred Wampler may refer to:

- Fred Wampler (politician) (1909–1999), Congressman from Indiana's 6th district from 1959–1961
- Fred Wampler (golfer) (1923–1985), PGA Tour and Senior PGA Tour player
