= William Driver (disambiguation) =

William Driver may refer to:

- William Driver (1803–1886), American ship captain who coined the phrase "Old Glory" for the U.S. flag
- William J. Driver (1873–1948), American politician from Arkansas
- William L. Driver (1883–1941), American football coach for Washburn University, Mississippi, TCU and UC Davis
- William J. Driver (administrator) (1918–1985), American administrator for Veterans Affairs and commissioner for Social Security
