= Tullidge =

Tullidge is a surname. Notable people with the surname include:

- Edward Tullidge (1829–1894), American literary critic, newspaper editor, playwright, and historian
- John E. Tullidge (1806–1873), American music critic, musician, and hymnwriter
- Margaret A. Tullidge (1892–1986), American newspaper columnist, home economist
