= Cecil M. Harden =

American politician (1894–1984)

Cecil Murray Harden
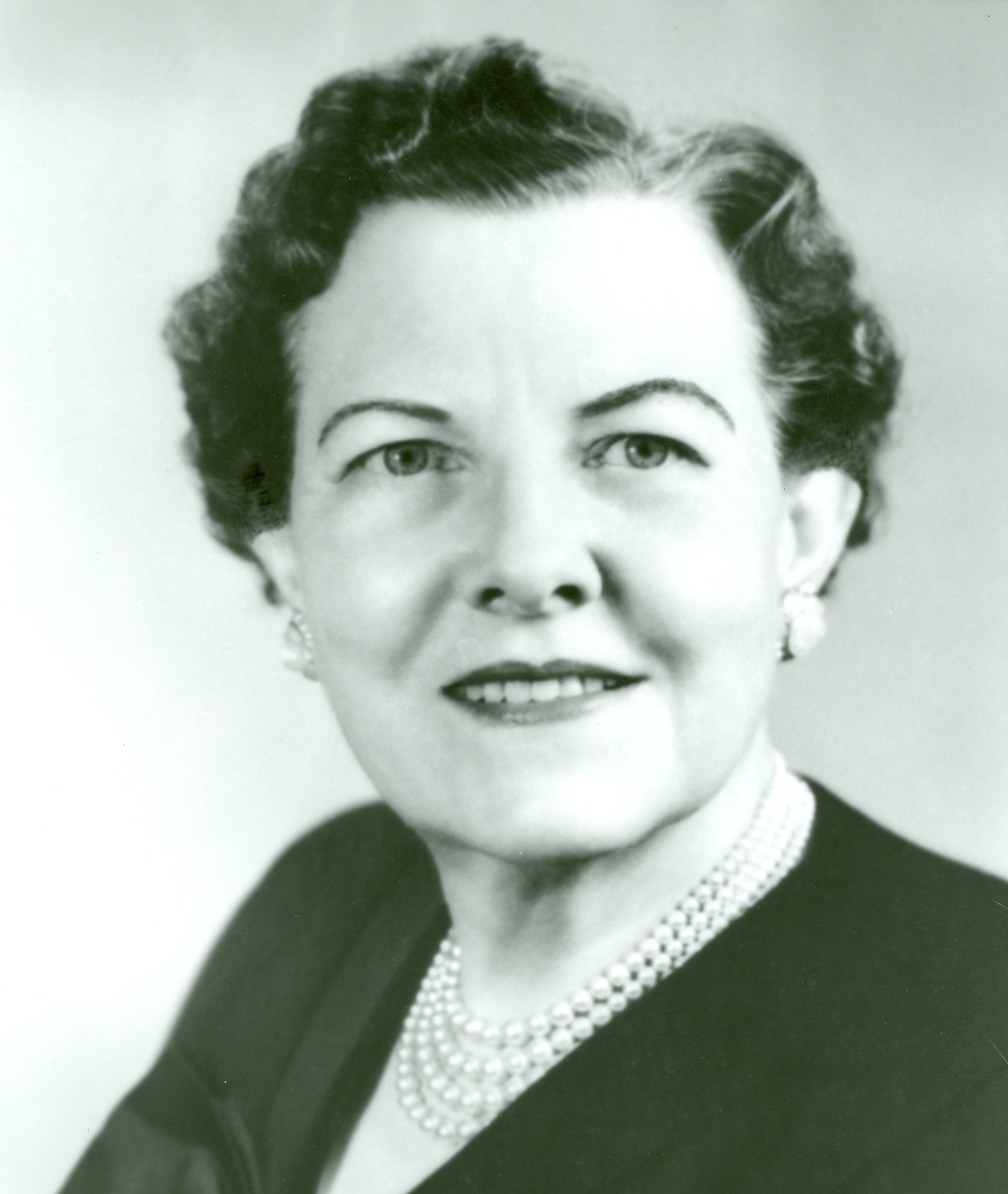

Member of the U.S. House of Representatives from Indiana's 6th district
- In office January 3, 1949 – January 3, 1959
- Preceded by: Noble J. Johnson
- Succeeded by: Fred Wampler

Personal details
- Born: Cecil Murray; November 21, 1894 Covington, Indiana, U.S.
- Died: December 5, 1984 (aged 90) Lafayette, Indiana, U.S.
- Resting place: Mount Hope Cemetery in Fountain County
- Party: Republican
- Spouse: Frost Revere Harden
- Children: Murray Harden

Cecil Murray Harden (November 21, 1894 – December 5, 1984) was an American educator who became a Republican politician and an advocate of women's rights. She served five terms in the U.S. Representative (January 3, 1949 to January 3, 1959) representing Indiana's 6th congressional district. Harden was the only Republican woman elected to represent Indiana in the U.S. Congress until 2012.

== Early life and education ==
Cecil Murray was born on November 21, 1894, at Covington in Fountain County, Indiana, to Jennie (Clotfelter) and Timothy J. Murray. Cecil's father was a real estate broker and a longtime leader of the local Democratic Party.

She attended local public schools and graduated from Covington High School in 1912. Murray enrolled at Indiana University in Bloomington, Indiana, but left IU to become a teacher in the Troy township schools, at later in her hometown of Covington.

=== Family ===
On December 22, 1914, Cecil Murray married Frost Revere Harden, "who eventually became an automobile dealer in Covington." Their only child, a son named Murray Harden (1915–1989), became a doctor in Lafayette, Indiana.

== Career ==
=== Local and state politics ===
Despite her father's ties to the Democratic Party, Harden became active in the local Republican Party. She first became interested in local politics in 1931, when President Herbert Hoover appointed her husband as Covington's postmaster. Harden became even more active in Republican politics in 1933, after President Franklin Delano Roosevelt took office and appointed a Democrat to replace her husband as the Covington postmaster.

Harden entered politics in 1932 as the Republican precinct vice chairman, a position she retained until 1940. Beginning in the 1930s and 1940s, Harden was active in Indiana politics. In 1938, she became vice chairman of the Fountain County Republican Party, a position she held until 1950, and served as the vice chair of an Indiana congressional district.

Harden joined the Republican National Speakers Bureau in 1940. She was elected Indiana's Republican National committeewoman in 1944, serving until 1959, and again from 1964 to 1972. Harden also served as a delegate-at-large to the Republican National Conventions in 1948, 1952, 1956, and 1968.

=== U.S. House of Representatives ===
In 1948, when Indiana Republican Noble J. Johnson resigned from the United States Congress to accept a federal judgeship, Harden won the Republican Party's nomination to run for his seat in the U.S. House of Representatives in the general election in the fall. In her first bid for elective office, Harden narrowly defeated Democrat John James (Jack J.) O'Grady by a margin of only 483 votes out of a total of 132,000 votes cast in the race. O'Grady, a native of Terre Haute, Indiana, was a U.S. Army veteran who had represented Vigo County, Indiana, in both houses of the Indiana legislature. Harden was elected to the 81st Congress and the four succeeding Congresses, serving from January 3, 1949, to January 3, 1959, a total of five consecutive terms in the U.S. House as a representative of Indiana's 6th congressional district. Harden voted in favor of the Civil Rights Act of 1957.

In her first term in Congress in 1949, Harden was initially assigned to the Veterans' Affairs Committee, but the next term she transferred to the House Committee on Expenditures in Executive Departments (later called Government Operations). During the 83rd Congress, Harden chaired the Inter-Governmental Relations subcommittee of Government Operations. She also served six years (1953–59) on the Committee on the Post Office and Civil Service. While serving on these congressional committees, Harden toured military installations to evaluate and looking for ways to improve the military's procurement procedures. In an effort to cut government costs under the Eisenhower administration, she also urged military and other government offices to consider using private companies to perform some of their work.

Harden, an advocate for women's rights, joined with Maine's U.S. Senator, Margaret Chase Smith, and Ohio's U.S. Representative, Frances Bolton, to urge the Republican Party to adopt platform planks of interest to women. In 1957, Harden and New Jersey's U.S. Representative, Florence Dwyer, offered "a bill to provide equal pay for women."

Harden served her Indiana constituents by promoting flood control in the Wabash River valley, helping to secure federal funding for flood control projects in her state. She was also critical of U.S. Atomic Energy Commission's plan in 1956 to close its heavy water plant in Dana, Indiana, which was within her congressional district. Harden claimed that 900 workers would become unemployed as a result of the closure.

Harden, who aligned her political interests with the Eisenhower administration, lost her bid for a sixth term in the U.S. House to Democrat Fred Wampler, a Terre Haute high school football coach, in 1958 by slightly more than a two-percent margin. Harden was one of Indiana's seven Republican congressional members who were defeated in the 1958 election (and one of the forty-seven seats in the U.S. House that the Republicans lost in the election). Her defeat was blamed, in part, on a recession that negatively affected industrial employment in Terre Haute.

=== Other service ===
Although her final congressional term ended in January 1959, Harden remained in Washington, D.C. Two months later, in March 1959, she was appointed to serve as special assistant for women's affairs to U.S. Postmaster General Arthur Summerfield. Harden remained at this post until President John F. Kennedy's Democratic administration replaced Eisenhower's Republican administration in March 1961.

Harden also continued to serve as a Republican national committeewoman for Indiana from 1964 until 1972, and as a delegate-at-large for the Republican National Conventions in 1968 and in 1972. In 1970, President Richard M. Nixon appointed Harden to the National Advisory Committee for the White House Conference on Aging, where she served in 1972 and 1973.

== Later years ==
Harden outlived her husband, Frost Harden, by nearly two decades. Following her retirement from politics in the early 1970s, Harden returned to her home in Covington, Indiana. She spent her final years in an assisted living facility.

== Death and burial ==
Cecil Harden died of cancer on December 5, 1984, at the age of ninety, in Lafayette, Indiana. Her remains are at Mount Hope Cemetery in Fountain County.

== Legacy ==
The "Cecil Murray Harden Papers, 1938–1984," are housed in the collections of the Indiana Historical Society in Indianapolis.

On December 14, 1974, President Gerald R. Ford signed a bill renaming Mansfield Lake in Parke County, Indiana, in Harden's honor. As U.S. Representative she had been involved in securing funds for the project. Under the Flood Control Act of 1938, the U.S. Army Corps of Engineers designed and built the lake by damming Big Raccoon Creek as part of flood control project for Big Raccoon Creek and the Lower Wabash River watersheds in Parke County. Construction began on the 2,060-acre (830-hectare) lake in October 1956; it was completed in July 1960. Indiana's Department of Natural Resources administers recreational uses of the lake in the Raccoon State Recreational Area.

== See also ==
- Women in the United States House of Representatives

== Notes ==
U.S. House of Representatives
Preceded by Noble J. Johnson	Member of the U.S. House of Representatives from Indiana's 6th congressional district 1949-1959	Succeeded by Fred Wampler
