= Margaret A. Tullidge =

American editor

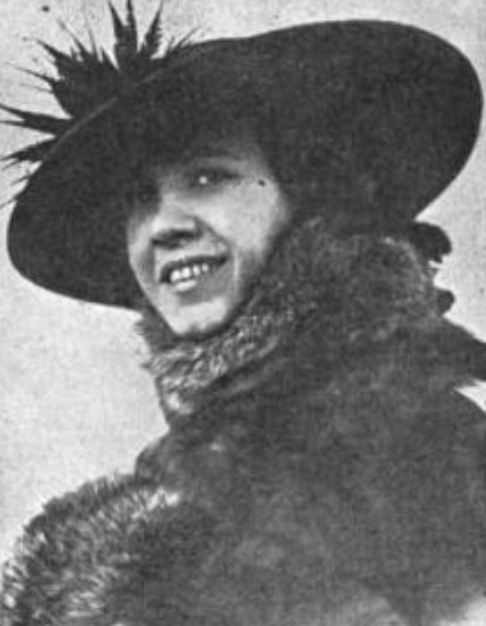
- Margaret Tullidge, from a 1921 publication
- Born: Margaret Agnes Tullidge; August 18, 1892; Philadelphia, Pennsylvania, U.S.
- Died: May 8, 1986 (aged 93); Los Angeles, California, U.S.
- Other names: Jane Tyler, Marget Sturr
- Occupations: Newspaper columnist, educator, editor, socialite
- Relatives: Charles R. Forbes (brother-in-law)

Margaret Agnes Tullidge Sturr (August 18, 1892 – May 8, 1986) was an American socialite, editor, columnist and educator.

== Early life and education ==
Tullidge was born in Philadelphia, the daughter of George Bowler Tullidge and Katherine O'Donnell Tullidge. Her father was a doctor. Her brother Edward Kilbourne Tullidge was a military surgeon who was expelled from Mexico in 1923, for his associations with revolutionaries in Tabasco, and her sister Katherine Tullidge Mortimer married politician Charles R. Forbes in 1925, after both were involved in a bribery and corruption scandal.

== Career ==
Tullidge taught domestic science in the Philadelphia public schools. During World War I she gave public demonstrations of canning, telling her audiences that "every woman, man and child can join the food army, even if they are not eligible to join the army in the battlefield". She also encouraged her audiences to serve nutritionally balanced meals.

Tullidge used the pen-name "Jane Tyler" as editor and columnist at The Philadelphia Inquirer. Her weekly column was called "What to Eat and How to Cook It". She was a member of the Philadelphia Club of Advertising Women. In 1922 she was one of the judges at a fudge contest at the Philadelphia Commercial Museum.

== Personal life ==
Tullidge married physician Robert Porch Sturr in 1922; at their wedding, she chose as her maid of honor Abigail Harding, sister of president Warren G. Harding; when Abigail Harding was unwell, another Harding sister, Mrs. H. H. Votaw, took her place. The Sturrs lived in Haddon Heights, New Jersey, and had two sons, Robert and George. She was separated from her husband when he died in 1950; her older son died in 1980. She died in Los Angeles in 1986, at the age of 93.
