= Jaime Areizaga-Soto =

American lawyer (born 1969)

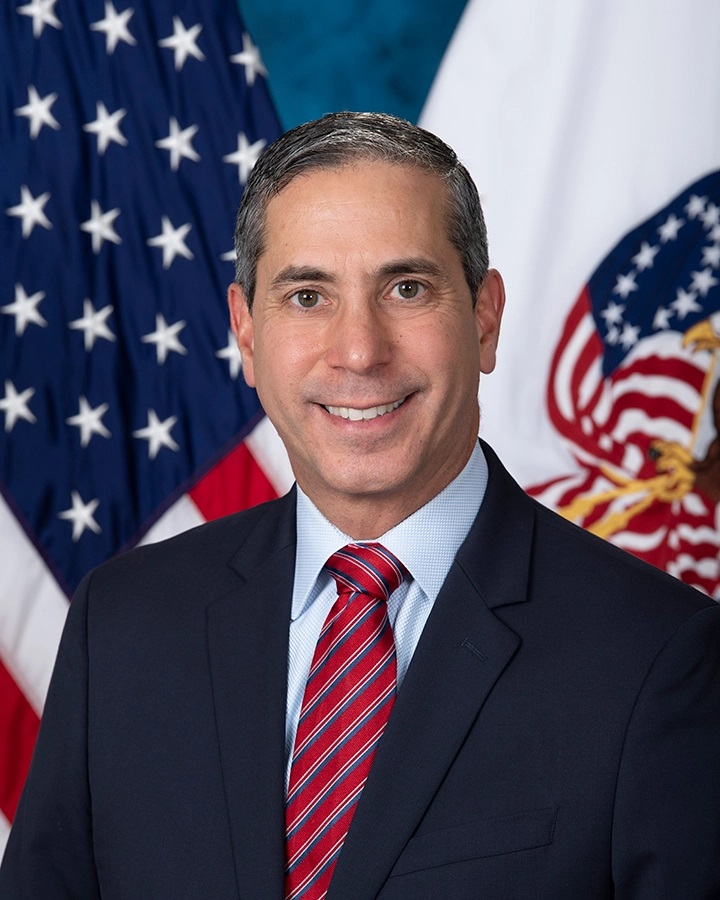

Chairman of the Board of Veterans' Appeals
- In office September 15, 2022 – January 15, 2025
- President: Joe Biden
- Preceded by: Cheryl L. Mason
- Succeeded by: Kenneth A. Arnold

Personal details
- Born: November 10, 1969 (age 56) Moca, Puerto Rico
- Party: Democratic
- Education: Georgetown University (BS); Stanford University (MA, JD)

Military service
- Branch/service: United States Army
- Years of service: 1997–present
- Rank: Mayor General
- Unit: District of Columbia Army National Guard; Judge Advocate General's Corps
- Awards: Legion of Merit; Meritorious Service Medal (1)

Jaime A. Areizaga-Soto is an American attorney and politician who most recently served as the chairman of the Board of Veterans' Appeals in the United States Department of Veterans Affairs from September 2022 through January 2025.

== Early life and education ==
Areizaga-Soto was born in Moca and raised in San Juan, Puerto Rico. The youngest of four siblings, his father worked for the Puerto Rico Department of Economic Development and his mother was an elementary school teacher. He earned a Bachelor of Science degree in foreign service from Georgetown University, followed by a joint Master of Arts in Latin American studies from Stanford University and Juris Doctor from Stanford Law School in 1994. General Areizaga-Soto graduated from the United States Army Command and General Staff College in Fort Leavenworth and has a master's in Security and Defense from the Inter-American Defense College in Fort Lesley J. McNair. Among his military awards are the Legion of Merit and the Meritorious Service Medal with one bronze Oak leaf cluster.

== Career ==
Areizaga-Soto began his career as an associate at Paul, Weiss, Rifkind, Wharton & Garrison. From 1996 to 1999, he was an associate at Hogan & Hartson. From 1999 to 2007, he was a member of the global project finance group at Clifford Chance. Areizaga-Soto later served as a White House fellow and attorney for the United States Agency for International Development in 2010 and 2011.

Areizaga-Soto served in the District of Columbia Army National Guard in the Judge Advocate, Headquarters Detachment, District Area Regional Command, Washington, District of Columbia. Served as Commander of the 352d Trial Defense Service Team and of the NGB Legal Support Office. In August 2021, he was promoted to the rank of Brigadier General, making him the first Latino Judge Advocate General's Corps General Officer in the Armed Forces. Brigadier General Areizaga-Soto was Special Assistant to the General Counsel, National Guard Bureau. From 2011 to 2013, Areizaga-Soto managed Latino outreach for the Democratic Party of Virginia. He also served as an advisor to State Senator Mary Margaret Whipple. In 2012 and 2013, he was deputy director of the Democratic National Committee for Hispanic affairs. He was also president of the Hispanic Bar Association of the District of Columbia in 2013 and 2014. From 2015 to 2018, he served as a commander in the National Guard Bureau. In 2016 and 2017, he was vice president of the Hispanic National Bar Association for membership. Areizaga-Soto also served as deputy Virginia secretary of veterans affairs.

On April 25, 2022, President Joe Biden nominated Areizaga-Soto to serve as the Chairman of the Board of Veterans Appeals, replacing Cheryl Mason. Areizaga-Soto was confirmed by the United States Senate on August 4, 2022, and he was sworn in on September 15, 2022. Although his term was not set to expire until 2028, he submitted his resignation on January 15, 2025, citing his mobilization for a two-year active-duty tour.

== Military awards and decorations ==
These are among MG Jaime Areizaga military awards and decoration

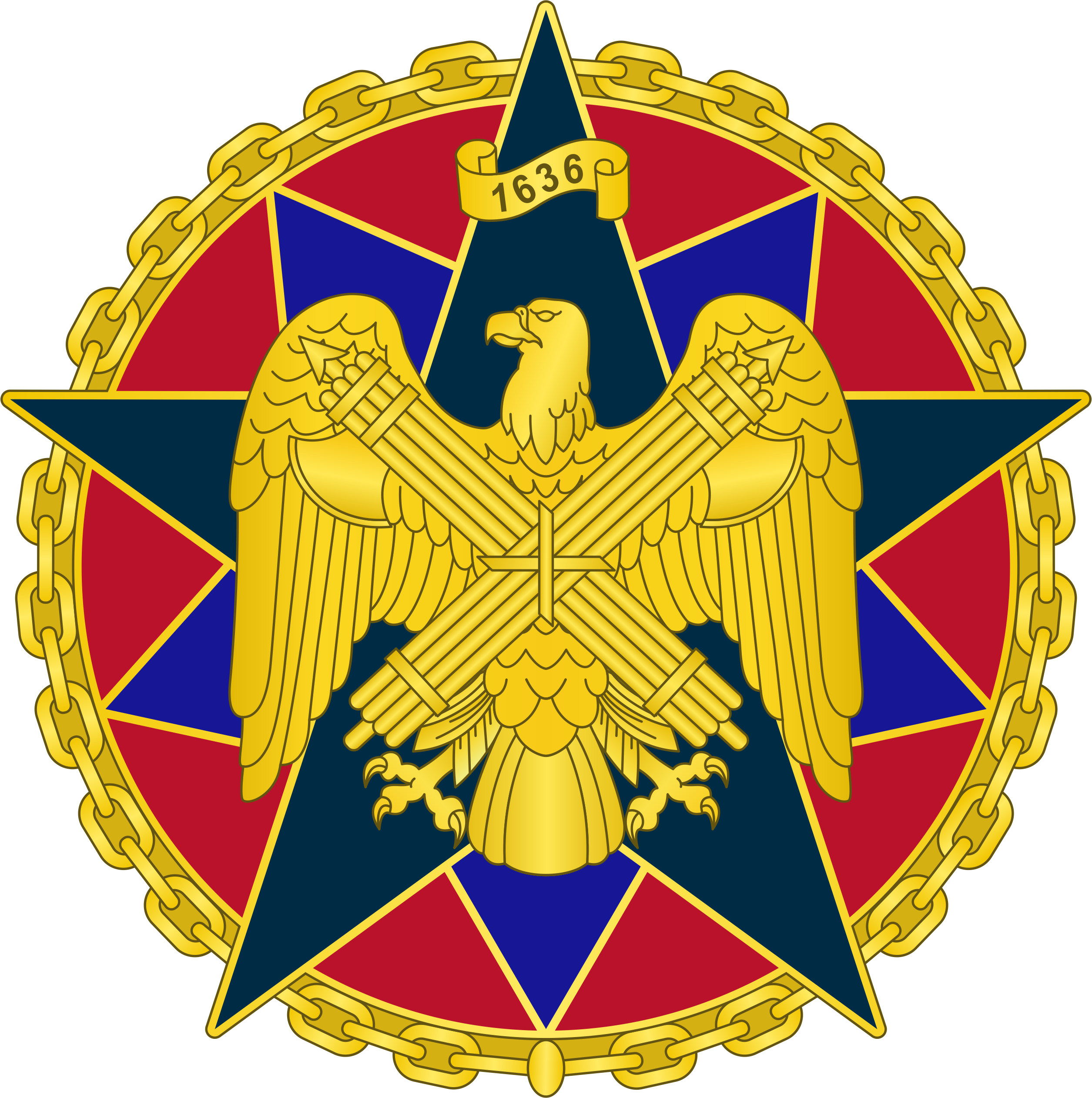
National Guard Bureau Organizational Badge
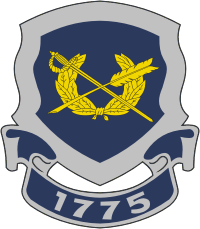
Regimental Insignia

Legion of Merit
Meritorious Service Medal (with 1 bronze Oak Leaf Cluster)
Army Commendation Medal (with 1 bronze Oak Leaf Cluster)
Air Force Commendation Medal
Army Achievement Medal (with 1 bronze Oak Leaf Cluster)
Joint Meritorious Unit Award
Army Superior Unit Award
Air Force Achievement Medal
Army Reserve Components Achievement Medal (with 1 bronze Oak Leaf Cluster)
National Defense Service Medal
Military Outstanding Volunteer Service Medal
Armed Forces Reserve Medal (with silver Hourglass)
Army Service Medal

Political offices
Preceded by Cheryl L. Mason	Chairman of the Board of Veterans' Appeals; September 15, 2022 - January 15, 2025	Succeeded by Kenneth A. Arnold
