= Michael J. Missal =

Inspector General of the US Department of Veterans Affairs

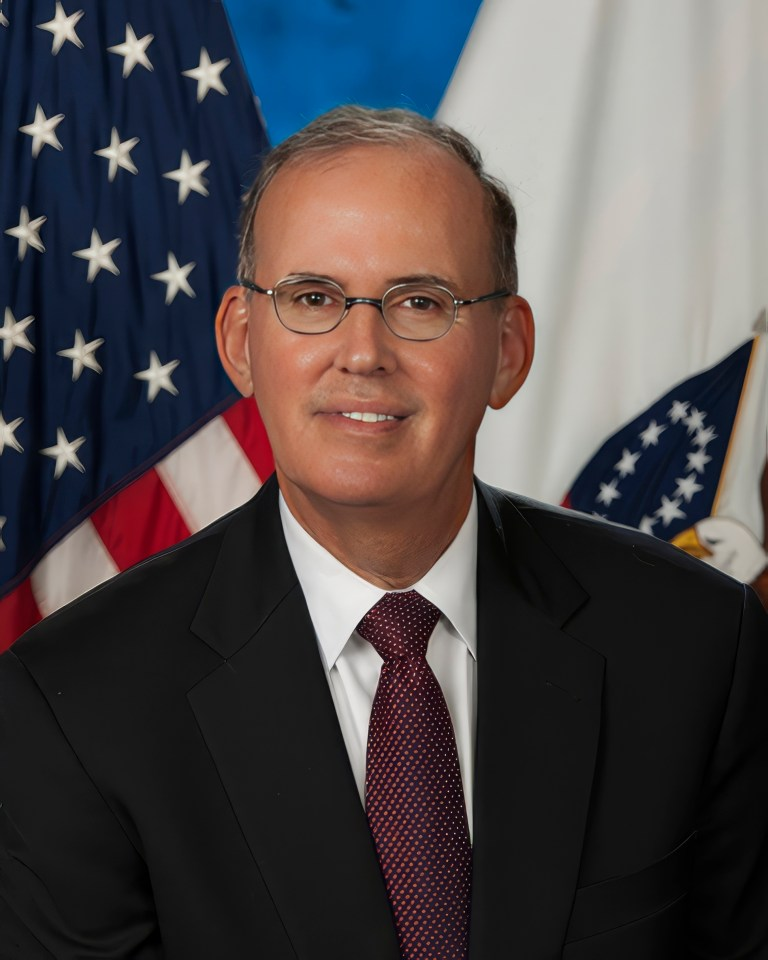
- Official portrait

Inspector General of the United States Department of Veterans Affairs
- In office May 2, 2016 – January 24, 2025
- President: Barack Obama; Donald Trump; Joe Biden; Donald Trump
- Preceded by: George J. Opfer
- Succeeded by: Cheryl L. Mason

Personal details
- Education: Washington and Lee University (BS); Catholic University Law School (JD)

Michael J. Missal is an American attorney who served as inspector general of the United States Department of Veterans Affairs from 2016 to 2025. He was confirmed by the Senate on April 19, 2016 and sworn in on May 2, 2016. On January 24, 2025, he was fired by President Donald Trump along with at least 17 other Inspectors General; however, the legality of the firing remains in question.

== Early life and education ==
Missal was born in Bristol, Connecticut. His father, Harold Missal, a decorated WWII veteran who helped liberate the Dachau concentration camp, served as a Connecticut state court judge for more than forty years. Missal graduated from Washington and Lee University and received his Juris Doctor degree from Catholic University Law School.

== Career ==
Missal served in the Carter administration as a staff assistant to assistant to the president Anne Wexler and then as a law clerk to counsel to the president Lloyd Cutler. After graduating from law school, he served as a law clerk for Chief Judge H. Carl Moultrie I of the Superior Court of the District of Columbia. He then joined the US Securities and Exchange Commission in the Division of Enforcement.

Prior to his appointment as inspector general, Missal was a partner at K&L Gates LLP, where he was a member of the K&L Gates Management Committee and also served as co-leader for the K&L Gates Policy and Regulatory Practice Area. He led several high-profile investigations, including an inquiry into the use of the “Killian” documents by 60 Minutes; the collapse of WorldCom for the federal bankruptcy court; and, as the DOJ appointed bankruptcy examiner, the report about the financial misconduct at New Century Financial.

== Inspector General ==
As Inspector General, Mr. Missal guides a staff of more than 1,100 auditors, investigators, inspectors, data analysts, lawyers, and other personnel across the nation to carry out the OIG’s mission of meaningful independent oversight of VA; to find waste, fraud, and abuse at VA. Some examples of fraud found by Mr. Missal and his staff, included the prosecution of Reta Mays, the report on the improper travel of former VA Secretary David Shulkin, the prosecution of Dr. Robert Levy, the payment of illegal bonuses to VA senior staff, and failures of the Veterans Crisis Line. Mr. Missal serves as the chair of the Investigations Committee of the Council of Inspectors General on Integrity and Efficiency (CIGIE) and is a member of the Pandemic Response Accountability Committee, CIGIE’s Executive Council, and Government Accountability Office’s Domestic Working Group. He has testified more than 25 times before Congress and briefs VA senior leaders, other federal oversight officials, and veterans service organizations on issues critical to the veteran community.
