= Military Railway Service (United States) =

United States Army reserve force

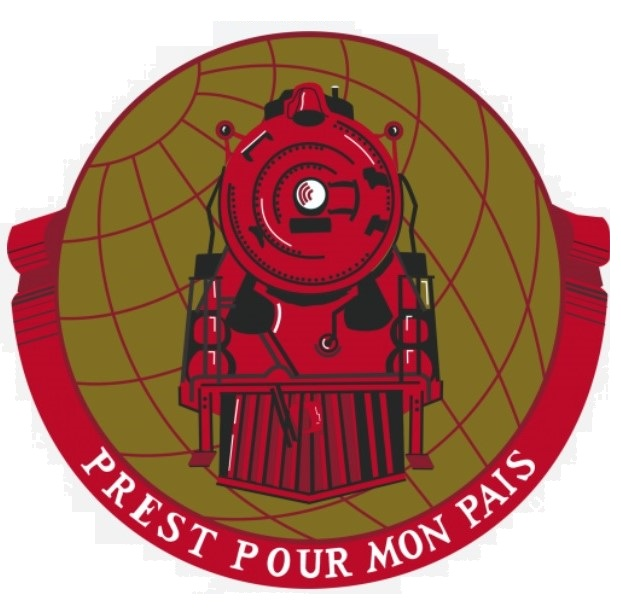
Military Railway Service insignia

The Military Railway Service was created in the 1920s as a reserve force of the United States Army. It had existed twice before: first as the United States Military Railroad during the American Civil War, and later as the United States Railroad Administration during World War I. In the original documentation in the creation of the service, all Class I railroad companies were to create a battalion for the war effort. Eleven Grand Divisions were formed and forty-six operating battalions were assigned; however, five were never activated.

== History ==
Each railway operating battalion was established with four companies. The Headquarters Company was used for signaling, dispatching, and supplying the battalion's section of the railway. The A Company was set up to handle the maintenance of tracks, the B Company handled the maintenance of the rolling stock, and the C Company was set up with roughly 50 men to operate the trains in their area. Grand Divisions were established with multiple operating battalions, a shop battalion, and a base depot company. The shop battalion worked on the engines themselves. During the war, there were two types of shop battalions, steam and diesel; most were steam battalions.

By 1942, the first units started to be shipped out. Besides units for the Persian Gulf Command and North Africa, the 761st Operating Battalion went to England and the 770th Operating Battalion to Alaska. In November 1942, jurisdiction of Military Railway Service shifted from the Corps of Engineers to the newly-created Transportation Corps.

The 1st and 2nd Military Railway Service (MRS) controlled supply by rail in the European Theater of Operations (ETO). The 1st was assigned to the Mediterranean with Italy, North Africa, and southern France as its main areas of operations. The 2nd was assigned to Northern France and Germany. The 3rd MRS was established to handle supplies sent to Russia through Iran (Persian Corridor).

The 1st MRS was led by Brigadier General Carl R. Gray Jr., an executive from the Chicago, St. Paul, Minneapolis & Omaha Railroad, who was the son of Carl R. Gray Sr., the former president of multiple railways in the United States, including the Union Pacific. The battalions under his command included the 701st, 703rd, 704th, 713th, 715th, 719th, 727th, 753rd, 759th, and the 760th. The 3rd MRS was set up using the 702nd Grand Division with the 711th and 730th Operating, 754th Shop, and 762nd Diesel Shop battalions as its core units. Initial command was under the 702nd, but by April 1944 it was replaced by the 3rd MRS directly. The 702nd and initial 3rd MRS commander was Colonel Paul F. Yount, but in May 1944, he was sent east to assist the China Burma India Theater and Colonel Frank S. Besson Jr. was tasked to take over the 3rd MRS.

== List of Railway Grand Divisions and their sponsors ==
Unit	Sponsor	Date of Activation
701st	New York Central Railroad	01/11/1943
702nd	Union Pacific Railroad	10/15/1942
703rd	Atlantic Coast Line Railroad	08/01/1943
704th	Great Northern Railway	11/30/1942
705th	Southern Pacific Lines	05/19/1943
706th	Pennsylvania Railroad	08/06/1943
707th	Southern Railway	06/10/1943
708th	Baltimore and Ohio Railroad	04/06/1943
709th	Association of American Railroads	03/15/1944
710th	Atchison, Topeka and Santa Fe Railway	12/14/1943
774th	None (Organized in Italy)	1944

== List of Railway Operating Battalions ==
Unit	Sponsor	Date of Activation
711th	Training Battalion. Built and maintained the 50 mile Claiborne-Polk Military Railroad	05/01/1941
712th	Reading Railroad	10/25/1942
713th	Atchison, Topeka and Santa Fe Railway	04/15/1942
714th	Chicago, St. Paul, Minneapolis and Omaha Railway	10/31/1942
715th	Illinois Central Railroad	10/31/1942
716th	Southern Pacific Lines	12/21/1943
717th	Pennsylvania Railroad	12/01/1943
718th	Cleveland, Cincinnati, Chicago and St. Louis Railway	12/14/1943
719th	Texas and New Orleans Railroad	09/01/1943
720th	Chicago and North Western Railway	08/26/1943
721st	New York Central Railroad	04/14/1943
722nd	Seaboard Air Line Railroad	12/14/1943
723rd	Union Pacific Railroad	12/28/1943
724th	Pennsylvania Railroad	12/28/1943
725th	Chicago, Rock Island and Pacific Railroad	02/17/1943
726th	Wabash Railroad	06/26/1943
727th	Southern Railway	03/15/1942
728th	Louisville and Nashville Railroad	01/11/1943
729th	New York, New Haven and Hartford Railroad	01/11/1943
730th	Pennsylvania Railroad	05/15/1942
731st	Union Pacific Railroad	Did not Activate
732nd	Great Northern Railway	01/12/1944
733rd	Central of Georgia Railway	11/23/1943
734th	Texas and New Orleans Railroad	02/23/1944
735th	ARR/Erie Railroad	02/10/1944
736th	New York Central	Did not Activate
737th	New York Central	09/30/1944
738th	Chicago Great Western Railway	Did not Activate
739th	Lehigh Valley Railroad	Did not Activate
740th	Chesapeake and Ohio Railway	12/14/1943
741st	Gulf, Mobile and Ohio Railroad	01/12/1944
742nd	Pennsylvania Railroad	Did not Activate
743rd	Illinois Central Railroad	01/12/1944
744th	Chicago, Milwaukee, St. Paul and Pacific Railroad	12/21/1943
745th	Chicago, Burlington and Quincy Railroad	05/19/1943
746th	Missouri–Kansas–Texas Railroad	05/04/1944
747th	Atchison, Topeka and Santa Fe Railway	Did not Activate
748th	Texas and Pacific Railway	05/12/1943
749th	New York, New Haven and Hartford Railroad	02/23/1943
750th	St. Louis – San Francisco Railway	03/21/1944
751st	Denver and Rio Grande Western Railroad	Did not Activate
752nd	Boston and Maine Railroad	05/04/1944
759th	Missouri Pacific Railroad	09/01/1942
761st	Railway Transportation Company	07/22/1942
770th	None	08/09/1942
790th	None	07/08/1943
791st	No sponsorship (activated at Andimeshk, Iran)	07/01/1943

== List of Railway Shop Battalions ==
Unit	Sponsor	Date of Activation
753d	Cleveland, Cincinnati, Chicago and St. Louis Railway	04/15/1942
754th	Southern Pacific Lines	10/25/1942
755th	Norfolk & Western Railway	11/30/1942
756th	Pennsylvania Railroad	01/11/1943
757th	Chicago, Milwaukee, St. Paul and Pacific Railroad	06/10/1943
758th	Atchison, Topeka & Santa Fe Railway	04/06/1943
760th	No sponsorship	06/16/1942
762d	No sponsorship	10/15/1942
763d	Delaware, Lackawanna and Western Railroad; Lehigh Valley Railroad	07/27/1943
764th	Boston & Maine Railroad	10/25/1943
765th	Erie Railroad	05/01/1944
766th	Association of American Railroads	07/17/1944

Note: The 760th and 762d were RSB (Diesel); all others were RSB (Steam).

== See also ==
- Military railways
