= Bob Nimmo =

American politician (1922–2005)

Administrator of Veterans Affairs
- In office July 15, 1981 – January 5, 1983
- President: Ronald Reagan
- Preceded by: Max Cleland
- Succeeded by: Harry Walters

Member of the California Senate from the 17th district
- In office December 6, 1976 - November 30, 1980
- Preceded by: Donald L. Grunsky
- Succeeded by: Henry J. Mello

Member of the California State Assembly from the 29th district
- In office January 8, 1973 - November 30, 1976
- Preceded by: William M. Ketchum
- Succeeded by: Carol Boyd Hallett

Personal details
- Born: February 5, 1922 Balboa, California, U.S.
- Died: November 7, 2005 (aged 83) Atascadero, California, U.S.
- Party: Republican
- Education: California Polytechnic State University, San Luis Obispo

Military service
- Branch/service: United States Army; United States Army Air Corps
- Battles/wars: World War II

Robert Nimmo (February 5, 1922 – November 7, 2005) was an American military officer and politician who served as the Administrator of Veterans Affairs from 1981 to 1983. He previously served in both chambers of the California State Legislature.

== Early life and education ==
Nimmo was born in Balboa Peninsula, Newport Beach. He attended California Polytechnic State University.

== Career ==
Nimmo left college to join the United States Army Air Corps in 1940. He flew missions over France and Germany in World War II, but was shot down over Poland and interned in Sweden for three months. After returning to the U.S. he served as a flight instructor until the end of the war.

After the war Nimmo joined the California National Guard, where he served until 1970. He commanded Camp San Luis Obispo and served as the United States Property & Fiscal Officer, and retired as a colonel.

A Republican, Nimmo served in the California State Assembly (1973 to 1976) and California State Senate (1976 to 1980).

In 1981, President Ronald Reagan appointed Nimmo to head the Veterans' Administration, and he served until 1982. Nimmo was known for his preference for cutting funding for VA programs. He referred to veterans groups as "greedy", and to Agent Orange as not much worse than a "little teenage acne", although his supporters argued that these quotes were taken out of context. His Deputy, Chuck Hagel, resigned in 1982 over disagreements with Nimmo.

As VA Administrator, Nimmo was also accused of excessive expenditures on redecorating his office, leasing an expensive sedan as his official vehicle, and improperly using the employee designated as his driver. Nimmo reimbursed the government more than $6,000 to compensate for the driver's unauthorized overtime.

After returning to California, Nimmo remained active in civic causes and local government, including service on the Atascadero City Council and a term as the city's mayor (June 26, 1990 to June 1994).

Political offices
Preceded by Max Cleland	Administrator of Veterans Affairs; 1981–1983	Succeeded by Harry Walters
