= Frank T. Hines =

United States Army General

Frank Hines
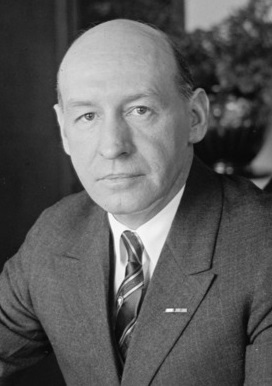
- Hines in 1924

United States Ambassador to Panama
- In office November 1, 1945 – February 20, 1948
- President: Harry Truman
- Preceded by: Avra Warren
- Succeeded by: Monnett Davis

Administrator of Veterans Affairs
- In office July 21, 1930 – August 15, 1945
- President: Herbert Hoover; Franklin Roosevelt; Harry Truman
- Preceded by: Position established
- Succeeded by: Omar Bradley

Director of the Veterans Bureau
- In office March 2, 1923 – July 21, 1930
- President: Warren Harding; Calvin Coolidge; Herbert Hoover
- Preceded by: Charles Forbes
- Succeeded by: Position abolished

Personal details
- Born: April 11, 1879 Salt Lake City, Utah, U.S.
- Died: April 3, 1960 (aged 80) Washington, D.C., U.S.
- Education: Utah State University, Logan

Military service
- Allegiance: United States
- Branch/service: United States Army; Organized Reserve Corps
- Years of service: 1898–1920 (Army); 1920–1943 (Reserve)
- Rank: Brigadier General
- Battles/wars: Spanish–American War; World War I

Frank Thomas Hines (April 11, 1879 – April 3, 1960) was a United States military officer and head of the U.S. Veterans Bureau (later Veteran's Administration) from 1923 to 1945. Hines took over as head of the Veterans Bureau after a series of scandals discredited the agency. He was considered a "man of stern honesty." In response to the scandals, the field service was "centralized to establish strict controls and accountability."

== Early life ==
Hines was born in Salt Lake City, Utah Territory, on April 11, 1879, the son of Frank L. Hines and Martha J. Hines. He graduated from high school in Salt Lake City in 1896, and worked at the mines in Mercur. He studied engineering at the Utah State Agricultural College for two years before deciding on a military career.

== Military career ==
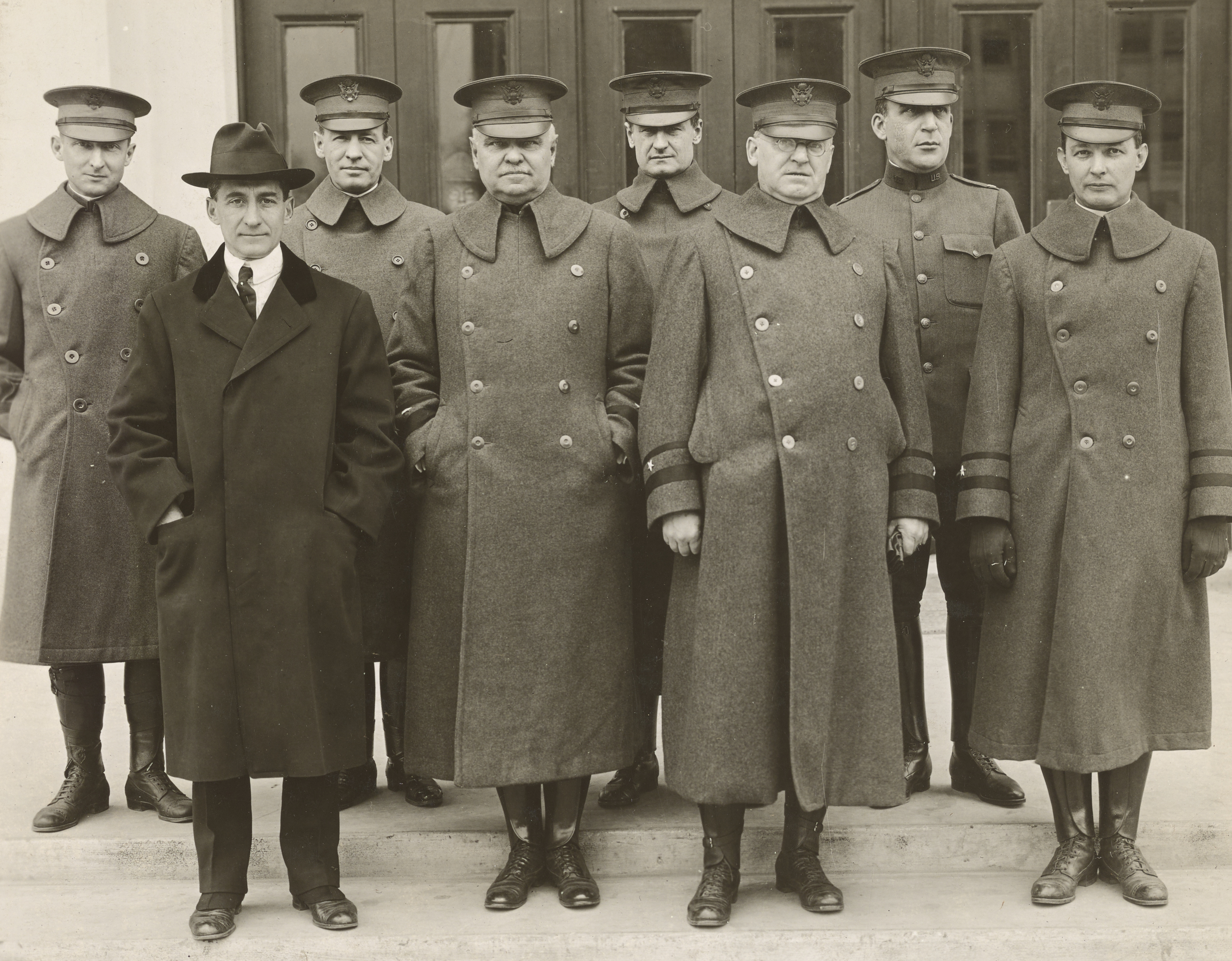
Major General George W. Goethals and members of his staff, December 7, 1918. Front row, left to right: Mr. Gerard Swope, Major General George W. Goethals, Brigadier General Herbert Lord, Brigadier General William H. Rose. Back row, left to right: Edwin W. Fullam, Brigadier General Frank T. Hines, Brigadier General Robert E. Wood, Colonel F. B. Wells.

He joined the Utah Light Artillery in 1898 and served in the United States military during the Spanish–American War, becoming a second lieutenant. He was a captain by World War I, was promoted three times in 1918, and as a brigadier general served as chief of the Embarkation Service with responsibility for transporting more than 2 million soldiers to Europe in 18 months and shipping them home in 8 months.

He retired from the army in 1920 and became president of the Baltic Steamship Company. After leaving active duty, Hines was appointed a brigadier general in the Organized Reserve Corps. He held this rank as an active reservist until reaching the mandatory retirement age of 64 in 1943, when he became a member of the inactive reserve.

== Political career ==
Hines served as the administrator of the Veterans Bureau from his appointment by President Harding in 1923 to 1930, then as the first administrator of its successor, the Veteran's Administration, from 1930 to 1945, when President Truman replaced him with Gen. Omar Bradley.

He opposed the payment of the Veterans Bonus to World War I veterans. On April 26, 1932, during the hearings on Payment of Adjusted-Compensation Certificates before the House Committee on Ways and Means he testified: that the trust fund had already been nearly exhausted by the previous year's act increasing the loan restriction on adjusted compensation accounts to 50%; that full payment now would cost the Government $1,600,000,000; and that in any case the accounts represented the only assets many veterans possessed, leaving nothing to families if the veteran should die. "We should make every possible effort to see that they get employment. There is no question about that. But whether we would be doing the veterans a real service by cashing in these certificates, even if we were in a position to do it, would seem to me very doubtful."

He then served as United States Ambassador to Panama and negotiated an agreement for the United States to lease bases there, where troops had been stationed during the war. The Panama Assembly rejected the agreement by a unanimous vote. Hines resigned in 1947, effective March 1, 1948, to become an executive with Acacia Life Insurance Company.

== Personal life and family ==
Hines was a member of the Church of Jesus Christ of Latter-day Saints (LDS Church).

On October 4, 1900, he married Nellie M. Vier. They had two children: Viera and Frank.

== Death and legacy ==
Until shortly before his death he served as a director of Acacia Life. Hines died of pneumonia on April 3, 1960, in Mount Alto Veterans Hospital in Washington, D.C. He is buried in Arlington National Cemetery.

== Awards and honors ==
General Hines was a recipient of the Army Distinguished Service Medal as well as the Navy Distinguished Service Medal.

He also received the Spanish War Service Medal and the World War I Victory Medal. His foreign decorations included the Czechoslovak War Cross, British Order of the Bath (Companion), Belgian Order of Leopold II (Grand Officer), French Legion of Honour (Officer), and Japanese Order of the Sacred Treasure (Second Class).

=== Army Distinguished Service Medal citation ===
The President of the United States of America, authorized by Act of Congress, July 9, 1918, takes pleasure in presenting the Army Distinguished Service Medal to Brigadier General Frank T. Hines, United States Army, for exceptionally meritorious and distinguished services to the Government of the United States, in a duty of great responsibility during World War I, as Chief of Embarkation in organizing and administering the Embarkation Service.

General Orders: War Department, General Orders No. 144 (1918)

=== Navy Distinguished Service Medal Citation ===
The President of the United States of America takes pleasure in presenting the Navy Distinguished Service Medal to Brigadier General Frank T. Hines, United States Army, for distinguished service in the line of his profession as Chief of Embarkation Service, War Department, Washington, D.C. General Hines acted in direct liaison with the Navy Department, and in addition personally co-operated with the Commander of the Cruiser and Transport Force in furthering the transportation of troops, and his zeal and ability greatly contributed to the successful operation.

Authority: The Navy Book of Distinguished Service (Harry Roy Stringer, 1921)

== Dates of rank ==
No pin insignia in 1898	Enlisted, Utah Light Artillery: 9 May 1898
No pin insignia in 1899	Second lieutenant, Utah Light Artillery: 23 March 1899
	Mustered out of service: 16 August 1899
No pin insignia in 1901	Second lieutenant, United States Army: 1 July 1901
	First lieutenant, United States Army: 17 December 1904
	Captain, United States Army: 4 December 1908
	Major, Temporary: 5 August 1917
	Lieutenant colonel, National Army: 11 February 1918
	Colonel, National Army: 22 March 1918
	Brigadier general, National Army: 18 April 1918
	Brigadier general, Regular Army: 7 January 1920; Resigned on 31 August 1920.
	Brigadier general, Officers Reserve Corps: 7 September 1920
	Brigadier general, Retired List: 31 May 1944

Political offices
Preceded by Charles Forbes	Director of the Veterans Bureau; 1923–1930	Position abolished
New office	Administrator of Veterans Affairs; 1930–1945	Succeeded by Omar Bradley
Diplomatic posts
Preceded by Avra Warren	United States Ambassador to Panama; 1945–1948	Succeeded by Monnett Davis
