= Harvey V. Higley =

American businessman (1892–1986)

Harvey Higley

Administrator of Veterans Affairs
- In office July 22, 1953 – November 13, 1957
- President: Dwight Eisenhower
- Preceded by: Carl Gray
- Succeeded by: Sumner Whittier

Personal details
- Born: Harvey Vanzandt Higley; February 12, 1893 Cheshire, Ohio, US
- Died: October 15, 1986 (aged 93) Marinette, Wisconsin, US
- Party: Republican
- Education: University of Wisconsin, Madison (BS)

Harvey Vanzandt Higley (October 26, 1892 – October 15, 1986) was an American businessman, civil servant and political operative.

== Early life, family and education ==
Higley was born in Cheshire, Ohio. He studied chemistry at the University of Wisconsin–Madison, graduating in October 1915. He served in World War I.

== Career ==
He worked for the Ansul Chemical Company of Marinette, Wisconsin, which specialized in making fire retardant chemicals. Higley eventually became the company's president (1938–48) and chairman of the board.

Higley was also active in politics and veteran's affairs. He joined the American Legion and served as Wisconsin State Commander from 1941 to 1942.

From 1947 to 1953, he was chairman of the Republican Party of Wisconsin. In July 1953, President Dwight D. Eisenhower appointed Higley to be the Administrator of Veterans Affairs, where he helped to establish Veterans Day as a federal holiday.

== Later life and demise ==
Higley retired in November 1957. He subsequently returned to Wisconsin.

He died on October 15, 1986.

Political offices
Preceded by Carl Gray	Administrator of Veterans Affairs; 1953–1957	Succeeded by Sumner Whittier
