= Sumner G. Whittier =

American politician (1911-2010)

Sumner Whittier
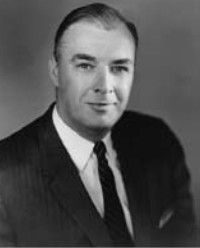

5th Administrator of Veterans Affairs
- In office December 18, 1957 – January 20, 1961
- President: Dwight Eisenhower
- Preceded by: Harvey Higley
- Succeeded by: John Gleason

58th Lieutenant Governor of Massachusetts
- In office January 8, 1953 – January 3, 1957
- Governor: Christian Herter
- Preceded by: Jeff Sullivan
- Succeeded by: Robert Murphy

Member of the Massachusetts Senate from the 4th Middlesex district
- In office January 1943 – January 1953
- Preceded by: Angier Goodwin
- Succeeded by: Fred Lamson

Personal details
- Born: Sumner Gage Whittier; July 4, 1911 Everett, Massachusetts, U.S.
- Died: January 8, 2010 (aged 98) Baltimore, Maryland, U.S.
- Party: Republican
- Education: Boston University (BA)

Sumner Gage Whittier (July 4, 1911 – January 8, 2010) was an American politician who served two two-year terms as the 58th lieutenant governor of Massachusetts from 1953 to 1957.

== Career ==
Whittier was an Alderman in the City of Everett, a member of the Massachusetts House of Representatives, and a Massachusetts Senator. He graduated from Boston University in 1936.

Whittier was the Republican candidate for Governor in 1956, but lost to Democrat Foster Furcolo. He was then appointed by President Dwight D. Eisenhower to head the U.S. Veterans Administration, a position he held until 1961. Thereafter he headed SSI at the Social Security Administration in Baltimore and worked there until age 80.

== Personal life ==
Whittier lived in Ellicott City, Maryland. He died on January 8, 2010. The Sumner G. Whittier School in Everett is named in his honor.

== See also ==
- Massachusetts legislature: 1941–1942, 1943–1944, 1945–1946, 1947–1948, 1949–1950, 1951–1952

Political offices
Preceded by Jeff Sullivan	Lieutenant Governor of Massachusetts; 1953–1957	Succeeded by Robert Murphy
Preceded by Harvey Higley	Administrator of Veterans Affairs; 1957–1961	Succeeded by John Gleason
Party political offices
Preceded by Laurence Curtis	Republican nominee for Lieutenant Governor of Massachusetts; 1952, 1954	Succeeded by Charles Gibbons
Preceded by Christian Herter	Republican nominee for Governor of Massachusetts; 1956	Succeeded by Charles Gibbons
