= Fred Wampler (politician) =

American politician (1909–1999)

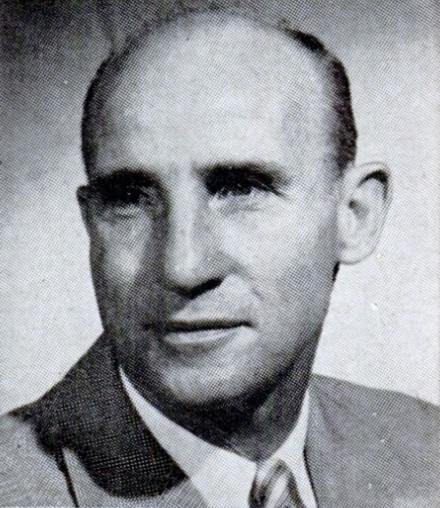

Member of the U.S. House of Representatives from Indiana's 6th district
- In office January 3, 1959 – January 3, 1961
- Preceded by: Cecil M. Harden
- Succeeded by: Richard L. Roudebush

Personal details
- Born: October 15, 1909 Carrier Mills, Illinois
- Died: June 8, 1999 (aged 89)
- Resting place: Roselawn Memorial Park, Terre Haute
- Education: Indiana State University

Fred Wampler (October 15, 1909 – June 8, 1999) was an American World War II and Korean War veteran who served one term as a U.S. representative from Indiana from 1959 to 1961.

== Biography ==
Born in Carrier Mills, Illinois, Wampler earned a B.A. from Indiana State University in Terre Haute, Indiana (at the time, Indiana State Teachers College), and an M.A. in 1940 from Indiana University. An excellent collegiate athlete, he was awarded 12 letters by Indiana State from 1928 to 1931, he entered the local high school teaching and coaching ranks following graduation. Over the next 21 years he was a teacher, the head football coach and assistant coach in tennis, golf and basketball at his alma mater, Gerstmeyer High School in Terre Haute, where he had lettered in four sports (baseball, basketball, football and track) as a student. From 1947 to 1949, during off seasons, he was a radio sports director and announcer.

=== World War II ===
A veteran of both World War II and the Korean War, he served in the United States Navy, (1944–46 and 1950–54); and in the United States Naval Reserve, (1946–49 and 1954–60) for a total of 15 years.

=== Congress ===
Wampler was elected as a Democrat to the Eighty-sixth Congress (January 3, 1959 – January 3, 1961). He was an unsuccessful candidate for reelection to the Eighty-seventh Congress in 1960 and for election to the Eighty-eighth Congress in 1962.

=== Later career and death ===
He was appointed to the Indiana-Illinois Wabash Valley Interstate Commission, serving from 1961 to 1962, and was regional coordinator, U.S. Department of the Interior, from 1963 to 1970. He also served as state and federal funding coordinator for the Ohio State Department of Natural Resources and Transportation from 1971 to 1976.

He died at age 90 in Mason, Ohio, and was interred in Roselawn Memorial Park, Terre Haute, Indiana.

U.S. House of Representatives
Preceded by Cecil M. Harden	Member of the U.S. House of Representatives from Indiana's 6th congressional district 1959-1961	Succeeded by Richard L. Roudebush
