= Carl Raymond Gray =

American railroad executive

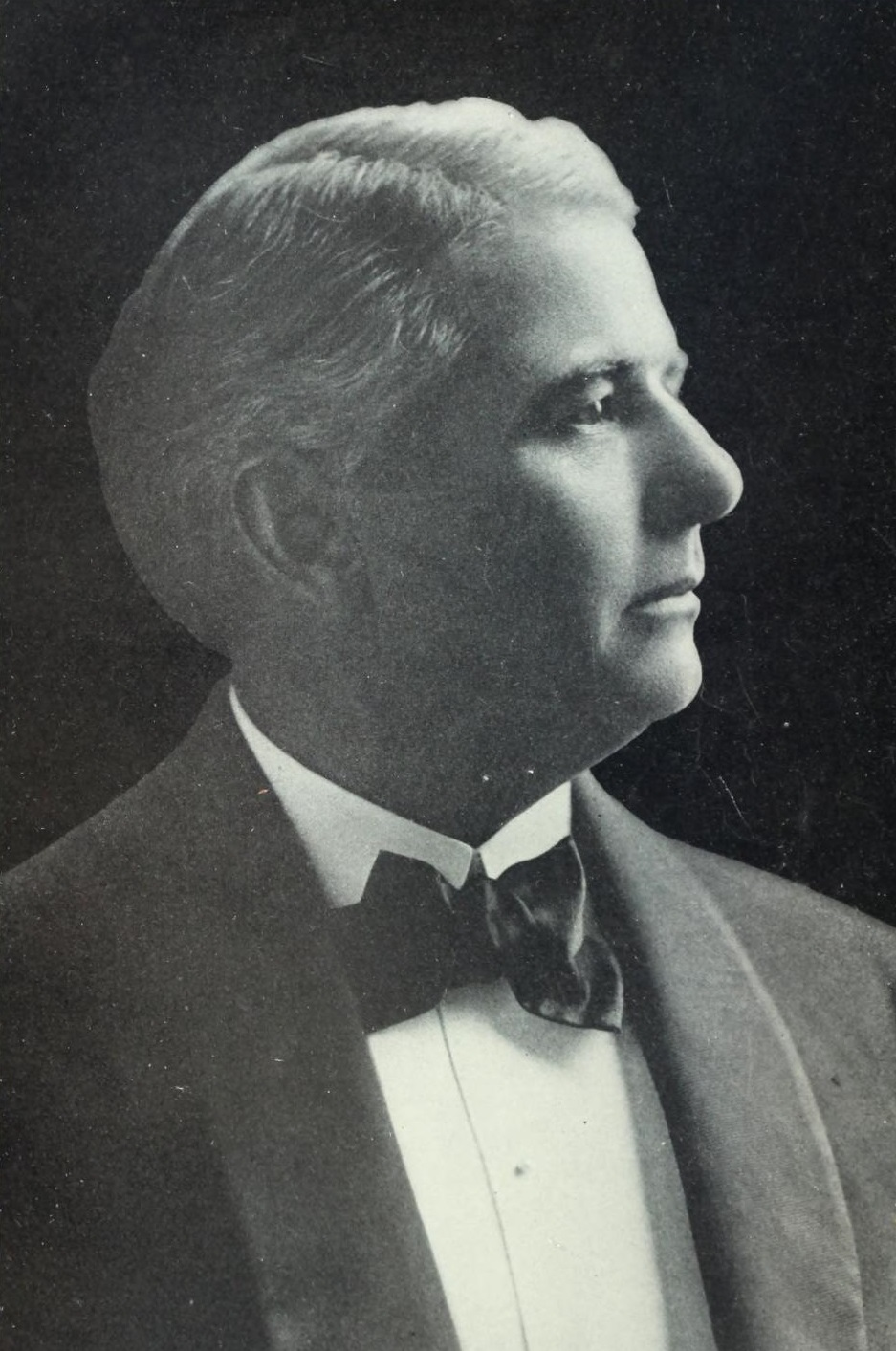
Portrait of Carl R. Gray

Carl Raymond Gray (1867–1939) was an American railroad executive in the early 20th century. He was President of the Great Northern Railway (U.S.) from 1912 to 1914, and of the Western Maryland Railway from 1914 to 1919, and lastly of the Union Pacific Railroad from 1920 to 1937.

== Biography ==
During his tenure, the Union Pacific Railroad was one of a very few American railroads that paid dividends on the company's common stock during the Great Depression. Gray was instrumental in developing the Union Pacific Railroad's burgeoning streamliner passenger train fleet, which included the famous M-10000 series of trainsets.

Gray was responsible for the construction and dedication of the Union Station in Omaha, Nebraska, which he declared to be, "Dedicated by the railways of Omaha to serve, comfort and convenience of the people."

He was father to General Carl R. Gray Jr. (1889–1955), also a railroad executive, who later served as Administrator of Veterans Affairs.

== See also ==
- List of railroad executives

Preceded by C.B Seger	President of the Union Pacific Company; 1920 – 1937	Succeeded by William Jeffers
