= Emma M. Cramer =

American politician

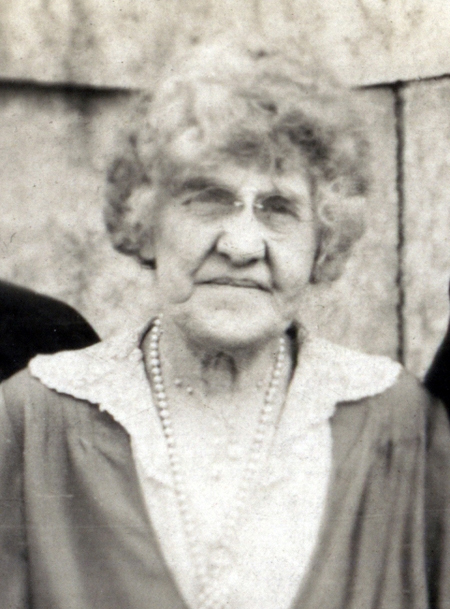

Member of the Ohio House of Representatives from the Scioto County district
- In office January 1, 1928 – December 31, 1932

Personal details
- Born: June 21, 1859 Portsmouth, Ohio, United States
- Died: June 15, 1952 (aged 92) Portsmouth, Ohio, United States
- Party: Republican

Emma M. Cramer (1859–1952) was a member of the Ohio House of Representatives from Scioto County. She was born in 1859 to Albert C. and Louise (née Crone) Cramer. She dedicated much of her life to the service of Portsmouth, Ohio. Cramer was a teacher at Portsmouth High School until she retired in 1933. During her teaching career, she was also involved in many civic organizations, including the Portsmouth City Council, the Republican Women's Society of Scioto County, and the Portsmouth Board of Education.
