= Richard L. Roudebush =

American politician (1918–1995)

Richard Roudebush
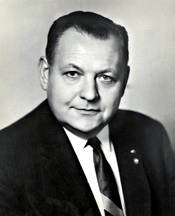

Administrator of Veterans Affairs
- In office October 12, 1974 – January 20, 1977
- President: Gerald Ford
- Preceded by: Donald Johnson
- Succeeded by: Max Cleland

Member of the U.S. House of Representatives from Indiana
- In office January 3, 1961 – January 3, 1971
- Preceded by: Fred Wampler
- Succeeded by: Bud Hillis
- Constituency: 6th district (1961–1967); 10th district (1967–1969); 5th district (1969–1971)

Personal details
- Born: Richard Lowell Roudebush; January 18, 1918 Noblesville, Indiana, U.S.
- Died: January 28, 1995 (aged 77) Sarasota, Florida, U.S.
- Party: Republican
- Education: Butler University (BA)

Richard Lowell Roudebush (January 18, 1918 – January 28, 1995) was an American politician who served five terms as a U.S. representative from Indiana from 1961 to 1971.

== Early life and education ==
Born on a farm in Hamilton County, near Noblesville, Indiana, Roudebush attended Hamilton County schools. He graduated from Butler University, Indianapolis, in 1941.

=== World War II ===
He served in the United States Army from November 18, 1941, to August 12, 1944, as a demolition specialist for the Ordnance Department in Middle Eastern, North African, and Italian campaigns. He was a farmer and a partner in a livestock commission company. He served as National Commander of the Veterans of Foreign Wars in 1957–1958, and as chairman of the Indiana Veterans Commission from 1954 to 1960.

== Congress ==
Roudebush was elected as a Republican to the Eighty-seventh and to the four succeeding Congresses (January 3, 1961 – January 3, 1971). Roudebush voted in favor of the Civil Rights Acts of 1964, and 1968, as well as the 24th Amendment to the U.S. Constitution and the Voting Rights Act of 1965. He was not a candidate for reelection in 1970, but was an unsuccessful candidate for election to the United States Senate against incumbent Democrat Vance Hartke in the closest Senate election in Indiana history.

== Later career and death ==
He later served as the Administrator of Veterans Affairs from 1974 to 1977.

He died in Sarasota, Florida on January 28, 1995, and was buried in Arlington National Cemetery. The Richard L. Roudebush V.A. Medical Center in Indianapolis was named in his honor.

== See also ==
- List of members of the House Un-American Activities Committee

== Sources ==
- United States Congress. "Richard L. Roudebush (id: R000464)". Biographical Directory of the United States Congress.
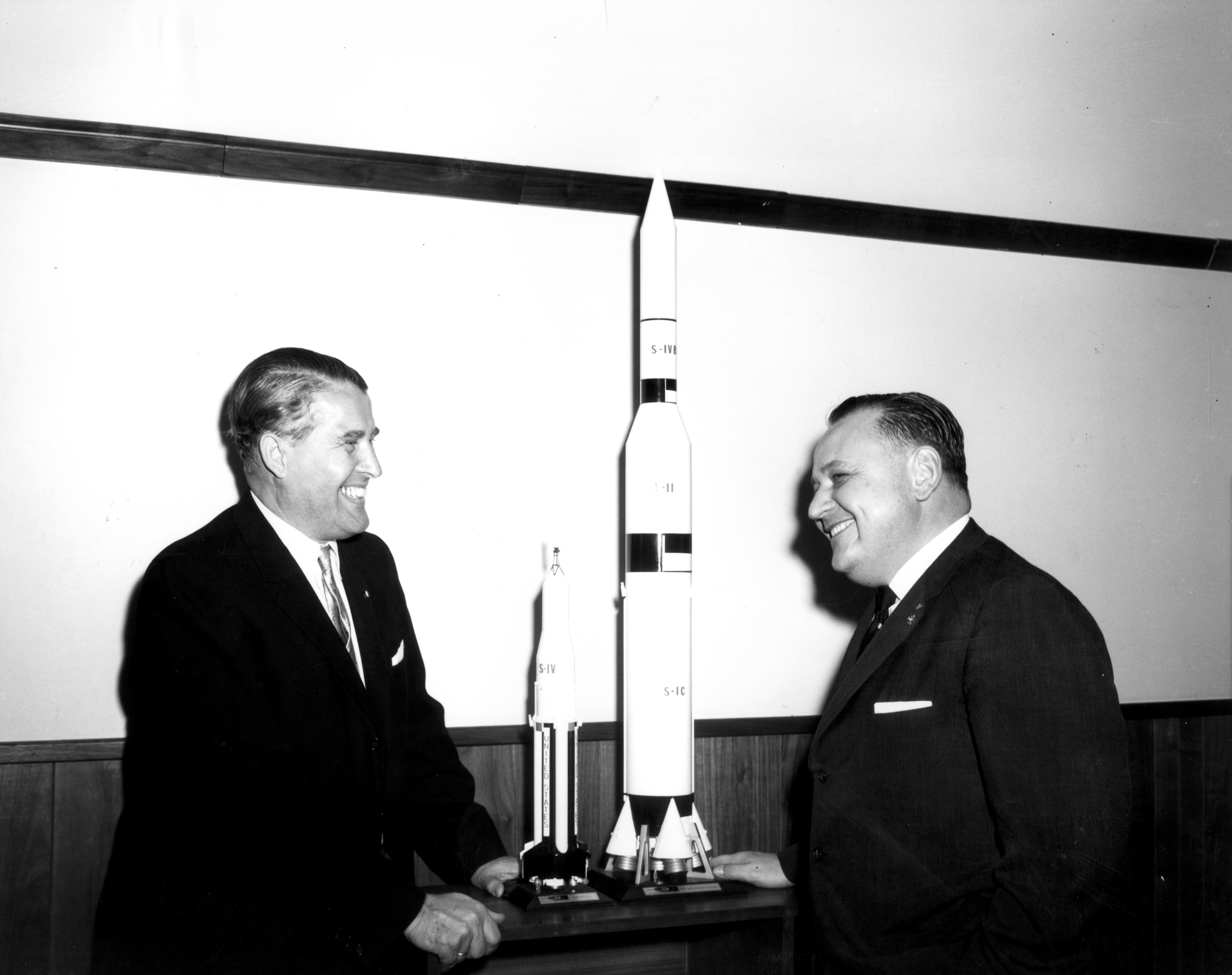
Wernher von Braun and Roudebush (L) discuss Apollo models.

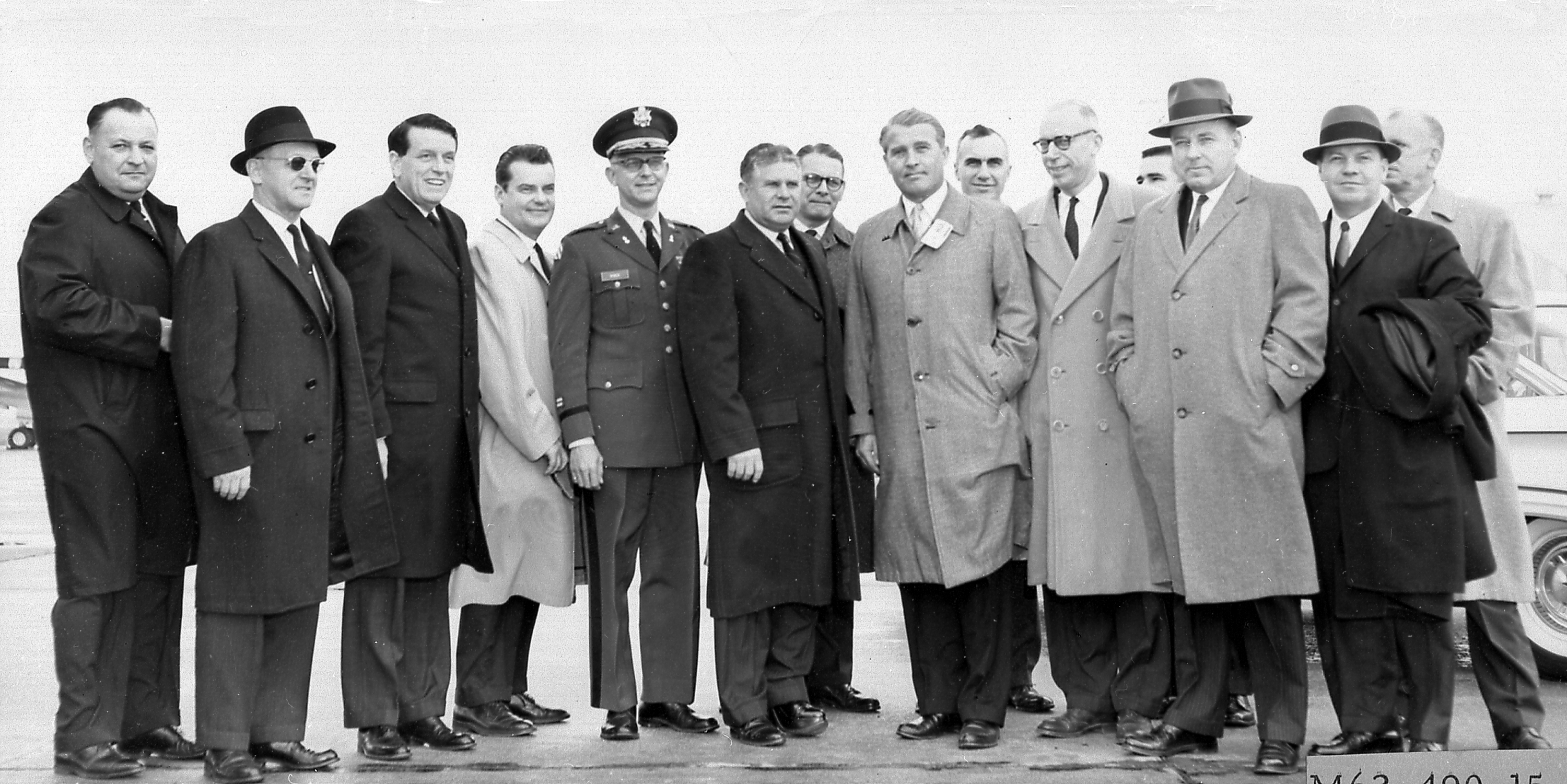
Representative Roudebush and other members of the House Committee on Science and Astronautics visit the Marshall Space Flight Center on March 9, 1962, to gather first-hand information of the nation's space exploration program.

U.S. House of Representatives
Preceded by Fred Wampler	Member of the U.S. House of Representatives from Indiana's 6th congressional district 1961–1967	Succeeded by William Bray
Preceded by Ralph Harvey	Member of the U.S. House of Representatives from Indiana's 10th congressional district 1967–1969	Succeeded by David Dennis
Preceded by Edward Roush	Member of the U.S. House of Representatives from Indiana's 5th congressional district 1969–1971	Succeeded by Bud Hillis
Party political offices
Preceded by D. Russell Bontranger	Republican nominee for U.S. Senator from Indiana (Class 1); 1970	Succeeded by Dick Lugar
Political offices
Preceded by Donald Johnson	Administrator of Veterans Affairs; 1974–1977	Succeeded by Max Cleland
