= USS Carl R. Gray =

Tugboat of the United States Navy

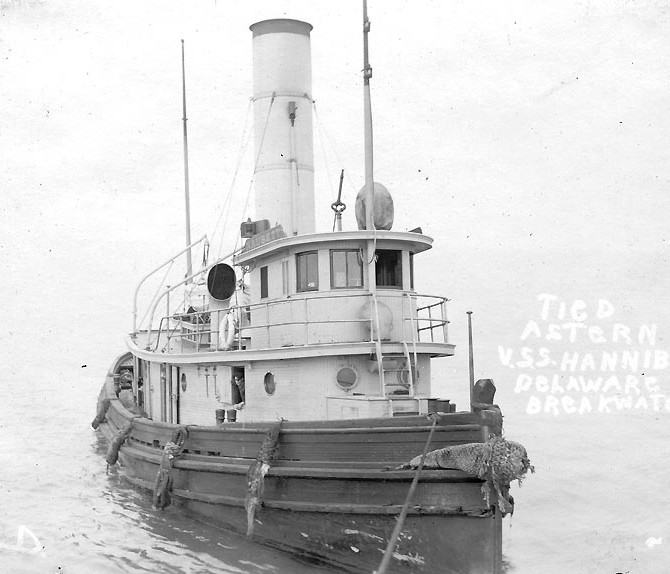
- USS Nausett at Delaware Breakwater, during the 1920s.

History

United States
- Name: USS Carl R. Gray
- Namesake: Former name retained.
- Ordered: as the civilian tug Carl R. Gray
- Laid down: date unknown
- Launched: in 1918 at Baltimore, Maryland
- Acquired: 5 October 1918
- Commissioned: 5 October 1918
- Decommissioned: 28 February 1933 at the Philadelphia Navy Yard
- Renamed: USS Nausett (YT 35), 24 November 1920
- Stricken: 13 March 1933
- Homeport: Philadelphia, Pennsylvania
- Fate: Sold in May 1933

General characteristics
- Type: tugboat
- Displacement: 115 tons
- Length: 88 ft 10 in (27.08 m)
- Beam: 22 ft 6 in (6.86 m)
- Draught: 9 ft 6 in (2.90 m)
- Speed: unknown
- Complement: unknown
- Armament: unknown

USS Carl R. Gray (No. 2671) -- later renamed USS Nausett (YT 35) -- was a tugboat, purchased by the U.S. Navy and commissioned on 5 October 1918, Boatswain J. Zucker .

== East Coast Service ==
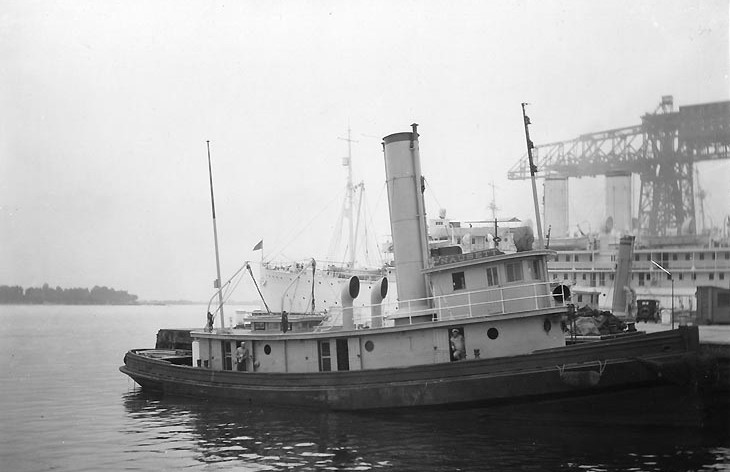
USS Nausett at the Philadelphia Navy Yard, Pennsylvania, on 5 June 1926. The hospital ship Mercy (AH-4) is partially visible in the background.

She was placed in commission as USS Carl R. Gray (ID # 2671) for service as a harbor tugboat with the Fifth Naval District.

In August 1919 she was transferred to the Fourth Naval District and on 24 November 1920 she was renamed and redesignated, becoming Nausett (YT-35). For the rest of her Naval career the tug served in the vicinity of the Philadelphia Navy Yard, Pennsylvania.

== Decommissioned ==
On 28 February 1933 she was decommissioned. She was stricken from the Navy Register on 13 March 1933 and sold.
