= John S. Gleason Jr. =

American banker (1915–1993)

John Gleason

6th Administrator of Veterans Affairs
- In office January 30, 1961 – January 1, 1965
- President: John F. Kennedy; Lyndon B. Johnson
- Preceded by: Sumner G. Whittier
- Succeeded by: William J. Driver

National Commander of the American Legion
- In office 1957–1958
- Preceded by: Dan Daniel
- Succeeded by: Preston Moore

Personal details
- Born: John Simon Gleason Jr. February 11, 1915 Chicago, Illinois, U.S.
- Died: May 2, 1993 (aged 78) Hines, Illinois, U.S.
- Party: Democratic
- Spouse: Mary Jane Harrigan
- Education: University of Notre Dame (BA); Harvard University (MBA)

Military service
- Allegiance: United States
- Branch/service: United States Army
- Years of service: 1941–1946 (Active); 1946–1973 (Reserve)
- Rank: Lieutenant Colonel (Active); Brigadier General (Reserve)
- Battles/wars: World War II; Asiatic-Pacific Theater • New Guinea campaign • Luzon Campaign
- Awards: Silver Star; Legion of Merit; Bronze Star (2 OLCs)

John S. Gleason Jr. (February 11, 1915 – May 2, 1993) was an American banker convicted of fraud in 1977. He previously served as the sixth Administrator of Veterans Affairs, from 1961 to 1965, and the National Commander of The American Legion from 1957 to 1958. He was a decorated World War II veteran, having received the Silver Star Medal, the Legion of Merit, and three Bronze Star Medals. After the war, he served as a senior officer in the United States Army Reserve.

== Early life and education ==
John Simon Gleason Jr. was born on February 11, 1915, in Chicago, Illinois. His father was employed at the First National Bank of Chicago where he would work when he grew older. He attended college at Notre Dame, graduating in 1940. Later in life, Gleason attended Harvard Business School, earning a second degree.

== Military service ==
Gleason interrupted his business career to enlist in the United States Army. By the end of World War II, he was a lieutenant colonel and had fought in the New Guinea and the Luzon campaigns with the 33d Infantry Division. Remaining active in the reserve during the Cold War, he was promoted to brigadier general.

== The American Legion ==
In 1946, Gleason organized the First National Bank of Chicago Post, No. 985, of The American Legion's Department of Illinois and was elected its first commander. His tenure as the National Commander of The American Legion from 1957 to 1958 is noted for its avocation of anti-communist education of young Americans.

== Career ==
In 1961, Gleason was appointed to the position of Administrator of Veterans Affairs. As such, he gave the national Veterans Day speech in 1964. In 1965, he returned to First National Bank of Chicago as vice president of business development. From 1970 to 1976, Gleason was chief executive officer of Mercantile Bank.

== Bank fraud ==
In 1977, Gleason plead guilty to charges of bank fraud for having used $500,000 of the Mercantile Bank's funds for personal use. He was convicted and sentenced to three years in prison, serving 18 months.

== Later life ==
Gleason later became a Roman Catholic deacon, serving as the first lay chaplain at Metropolitan Correctional Center. He also served as Chairman of the Board of Trustees of St. Francis Hospital in Evanston.

== Personal life ==
Gleason married Mary Jane Harrigan (1917-1998). The couple had six children: John S. "Jack" III, Daniel, Richard, Thomas, David, and Martin.

== See also ==
- List of administrators of Veterans Affairs
- List of people from Chicago
- List of members of the American Legion

Non-profit organization positions
| Preceded by Dan Daniel | National Commander of The American Legion; 1957–1958 | Succeeded by Preston Moore |
Political offices
| Preceded by Sumner G. Whittier | Administrator of Veterans Affairs; 1961–1965 | Succeeded by William J. Driver |
