= Cheryl L. Mason =

American lawyer and author

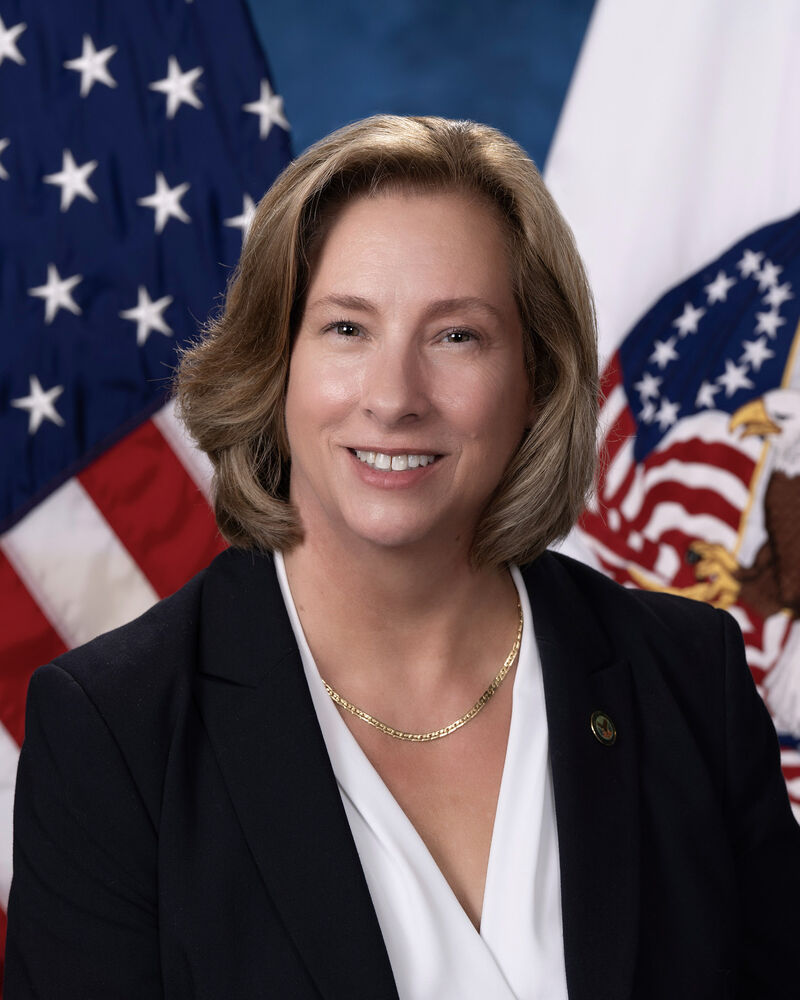
- Official portrait, 2025

Inspector General of the United States Department of Veterans Affairs
- Incumbent
- Assumed office August 4, 2025
- President: Donald Trump
- Preceded by: Michael J. Missal

Chairman of the Board of Veterans' Appeals
- In office November 8, 2017 – August 4, 2022
- President: Donald Trump; Joe Biden
- Preceded by: James P. Terry
- Succeeded by: Jaime Areizaga-Soto

Personal details
- Born: Portsmouth, Ohio
- Spouse(s): Brett S. Mason, Lt Col USAF(ret)
- Education: Ohio Northern University (BA); Creighton University (JD)

Cheryl Lee Mason is an American attorney and Inspector General for the Department of Veterans Affairs appointed by President Donald Trump.

== First Trump administration ==
From November 2017 until August 2022, she served as the fourth Senate-confirmed first woman and military spouse Chairman of the Board of Veterans' Appeals. In 2020, she was named a PREVENTS Task Force Ambassador, Along with Lead Ambassador Second Lady Karen Pence. PREVENTS was the first national public health campaign to address suicide prevention. Previously Mason served as Deputy Vice Chairman, Chief Veterans Law Judge, and Veterans Law Judge at the Board.

== Second Trump administration ==
Mason was nominated for Assistant Secretary of Veterans’ Affairs for Accountability and Whistleblower Protection on March 10, 2025. The nomination was withdrawn on May 6, 2025. On the same day, Mason was nominated for Inspector General of the Department of Veterans’ Affairs. The Senate Veterans Affairs Committee (SVAC) held a hearing on the nomination on June 4, 2025 and subsequently favorably reported on the nomination on June 11, 2025. The Senate invoked cloture and confirmed the nomination on July 31, 2025. She Assumed Office on August 4, 2025.

== Early life and education ==
A graduate of Ohio Northern University and Creighton University School of Law, Mason served as an intern for U.S. Representative Bob McEwen. After law school, she worked in private practice in Omaha, Nebraska. Mason became a paralegal coordinator for Central Texas College and an instructor at Central Texas College's branch at Kaiserslautern Military Community in Germany. She was an attorney with the Federal Labor Relations Authority and was a Department of the Air Force (DAF) Civilian with the United States Air Forces in Europe at Ramstein Air Base in Germany. Mason also served as a contract attorney investigator for the United States Department of Justice Civil Rights Division specializing in the Americans with Disabilities Act.

== Awards and honors ==
- Hiring Our Heroes Bonnie Amos Lifetime Achievement Impact Award 2022.
- Disabled American Veterans' Outstanding Federal Executive 2021.
- Department of Veterans Affairs Exceptional Service Award 2020
- FedHealthIT 2020 Leading for Impact: Women in Leadership Award.
- Hiring our Heroes Military Spouse Employment and Mentoring Award 2019
- Ohio Northern University Distinguished Alumni Award 2009.

== Published Works ==
• Mason, Cheri (2024). Dare to Relate: Leading with a Fierce Heart. Manuscripts Press. ISBN 979-8-88926-022-6

Political offices
Preceded by James P. Terry	Chairman of the Board of Veterans' Appeals; 2017-2022	Succeeded by Jaime Areizaga-Soto
Preceded by Michael J. Missal	Inspector General of the United States Department of Veterans Affairs; 2025-present	Incumbent
