= Donald E. Johnson =

Donald Johnson
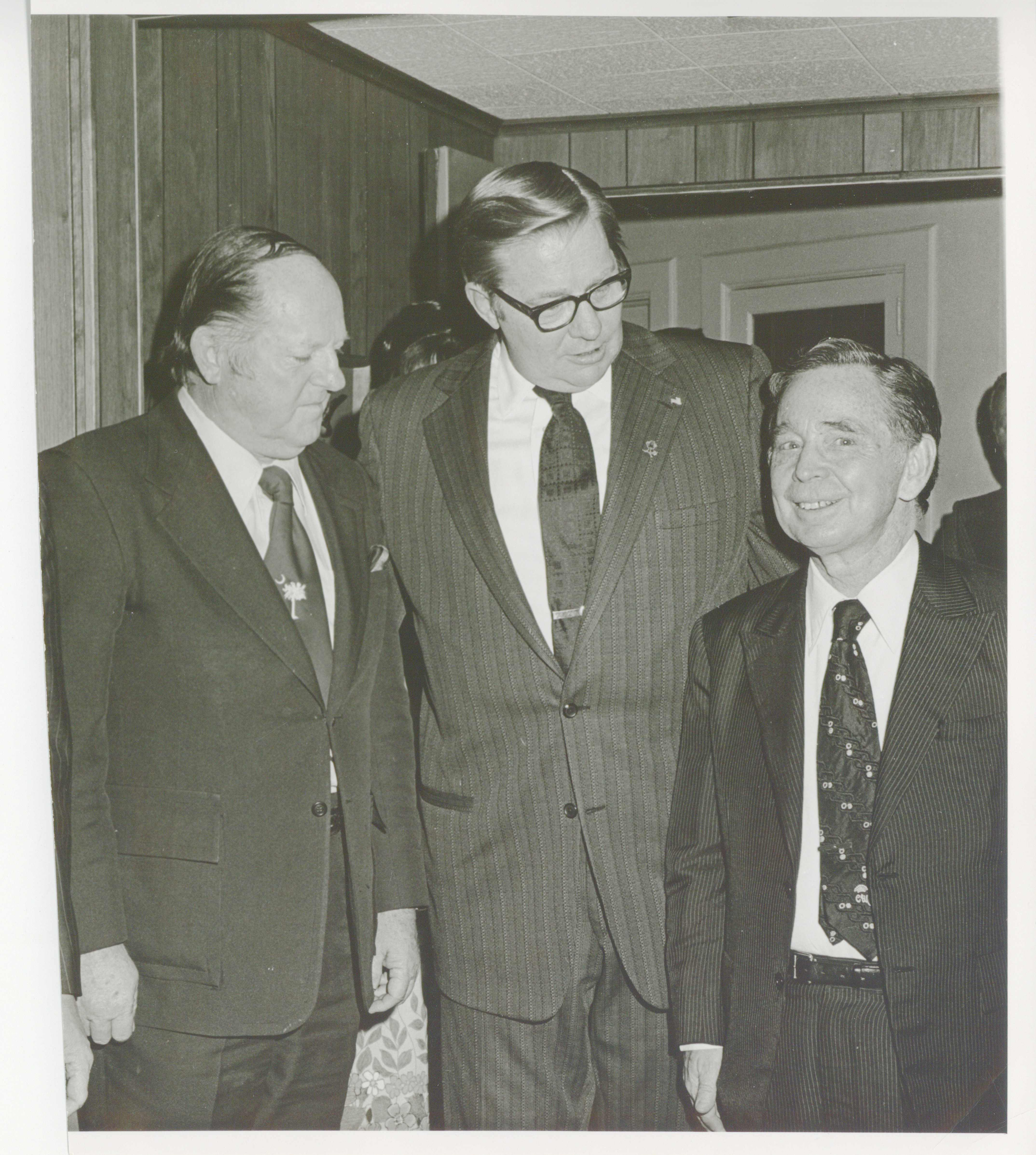
- Johnson (middle)

8th Administrator of Veterans Affairs
- In office June 23, 1969 – October 12, 1974
- President: Richard Nixon
- Preceded by: William J. Driver
- Succeeded by: Richard L. Roudebush

Personal details
- Born: June 5, 1924; Cedar Rapids, Iowa, U.S.
- Died: August 10, 1999 (aged 75); Fredericksburg, Virginia, U.S.
- Political party: Republican
- Education: Iowa State University (BS)

Donald E. Johnson (June 5, 1924 – August 10, 1999) was an American businessman who served as the Administrator of Veterans Affairs from 1969 to 1974.

He died of cancer on August 10, 1999, in Fredericksburg, Virginia at age 75.

Political offices
Preceded by William J. Driver	Administrator of Veterans Affairs; 1969–1974	Succeeded by Richard L. Roudebush
