= Harry N. Walters =

American businessman (1936–2019)

Harry Walters

Administrator of Veterans Affairs
- In office January 5, 1983 – March 21, 1986
- President: Ronald Reagan
- Preceded by: Bob Nimmo
- Succeeded by: Thomas Turnage

Assistant Secretary of the Army for Manpower and Reserve Affairs
- In office June 1981 – January 5, 1983
- President: Ronald Reagan
- Preceded by: Robert Nelson
- Succeeded by: Delbert Spurlock

Personal details
- Born: June 4, 1936 Fostoria, Ohio, U.S.
- Died: August 19, 2019 (aged 83) Coral Springs, Florida, U.S.
- Party: Republican
- Education: United States Military Academy (BS)

Harry N. Walters (June 4, 1936 – August 19, 2019) was a United States businessman who served as Assistant Secretary of the Army (Manpower and Reserve Affairs) from 1981 to 1983 and Administrator for the U.S. Veterans Administration from 1983 to 1986.

== Biography ==
Harry N. Walters was born on June 4, 1936. He was educated at the United States Military Academy, graduating in 1959. During his time at West Point, he played for the Army Black Knights football team as a fullback blocking for Pete Dawkins. He then served in the United States Army from 1959 to 1963.

Following his army service, Walters joined Kimberly-Clark, first in Neenah, Wisconsin, and then in New York City. He left Kimberly-Clark in 1975 to become executive vice president of the Standard Paper Manufacturing Company in Richmond, Virginia. He then spent 1976–77 as a management consultant with Howard Paper Mills, Inc. in Dayton, Ohio. In 1977, he became the chief executive officer of the Potsdam Paper Corporation.

In May 1981, President of the United States Ronald Reagan nominated Walters to be Assistant Secretary of the Army (Manpower and Reserve Affairs). Following Senate confirmation, he held this office until 1983 when he was nominated to be Administrator of the U.S. Veteran's Administration. He received Senate confirmation and served as Administrator from 1983 to 1986.

In 1986, Walters became CEO of the Great Lakes Carbon Corporation, holding that position until 1993. At the request of the White House, he oversaw the National Victory Celebration held in Washington, D.C., on June 6, 1991, celebrating American victory in the Gulf War. From 2001 to 2003, he was a commissioner on the President's Task Force to Improve Healthcare for American Veterans.

In 2006, Walters was influential in establishing, along with the American Legion, Veterans of Foreign Wars (VFW), Disabled American Veterans (DAV), AMVETS, and Paralyzed Veterans of America (PVA), a "Commission on the Future for America's Veterans." The Commission was funded and managed independent of government influence and at its conclusion in 2009 proposed a completely new approach for how the Department of Veterans Affairs (DVA) could be structured – suggesting that it become a "government corporation."

He died on August 19, 2019, in Coral Springs, Florida.

Political offices
Preceded by Robert Nelson	Assistant Secretary of the Army for Manpower and Reserve Affairs; 1981–1983	Succeeded by Delbert Spurlock
Preceded by Bob Nimmo	Administrator of Veterans Affairs; 1983–1986	Succeeded by Thomas Turnage
