= William J. Driver (administrator) =

American governmental official

William Driver
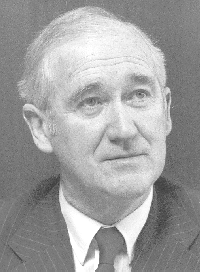
- Official portrait, 1980

8th Commissioner of the Social Security Administration
- In office January 3, 1980 – January 19, 1981
- President: Jimmy Carter
- Preceded by: Herbert Doggette (acting)
- Succeeded by: Herbert Doggette (acting)

7th Administrator of Veterans Affairs
- In office January 1, 1965 – May 31, 1969
- President: Lyndon B. Johnson; Richard Nixon
- Preceded by: John S. Gleason Jr.
- Succeeded by: Donald E. Johnson

Personal details
- Born: May 9, 1918; Rochester, New York, U.S.
- Died: June 25, 1985 (aged 67); Arlington County, Virginia, U.S.
- Political party: Democratic
- Education: Niagara University (BA); George Washington University (MPA, LLB)

William J. Driver (May 9, 1918 – June 25, 1985) was an American administrator who served as the Administrator of Veterans Affairs from 1965 to 1969 and as the 8th Commissioner of the Social Security Administration from 1980 to 1981.

He died of kidney failure on June 25, 1985, in Arlington County, Virginia at age 67.

Political offices
Preceded by John S. Gleason Jr.	Administrator of Veterans Affairs; 1965–1969	Succeeded by Donald E. Johnson
Preceded by Herbert Doggette; Acting	Commissioner of the Social Security Administration; 1980–1981	Succeeded by Herbert Doggette; Acting
