= Thomas K. Turnage =

American government official (1923–2000)

Thomas Turnage
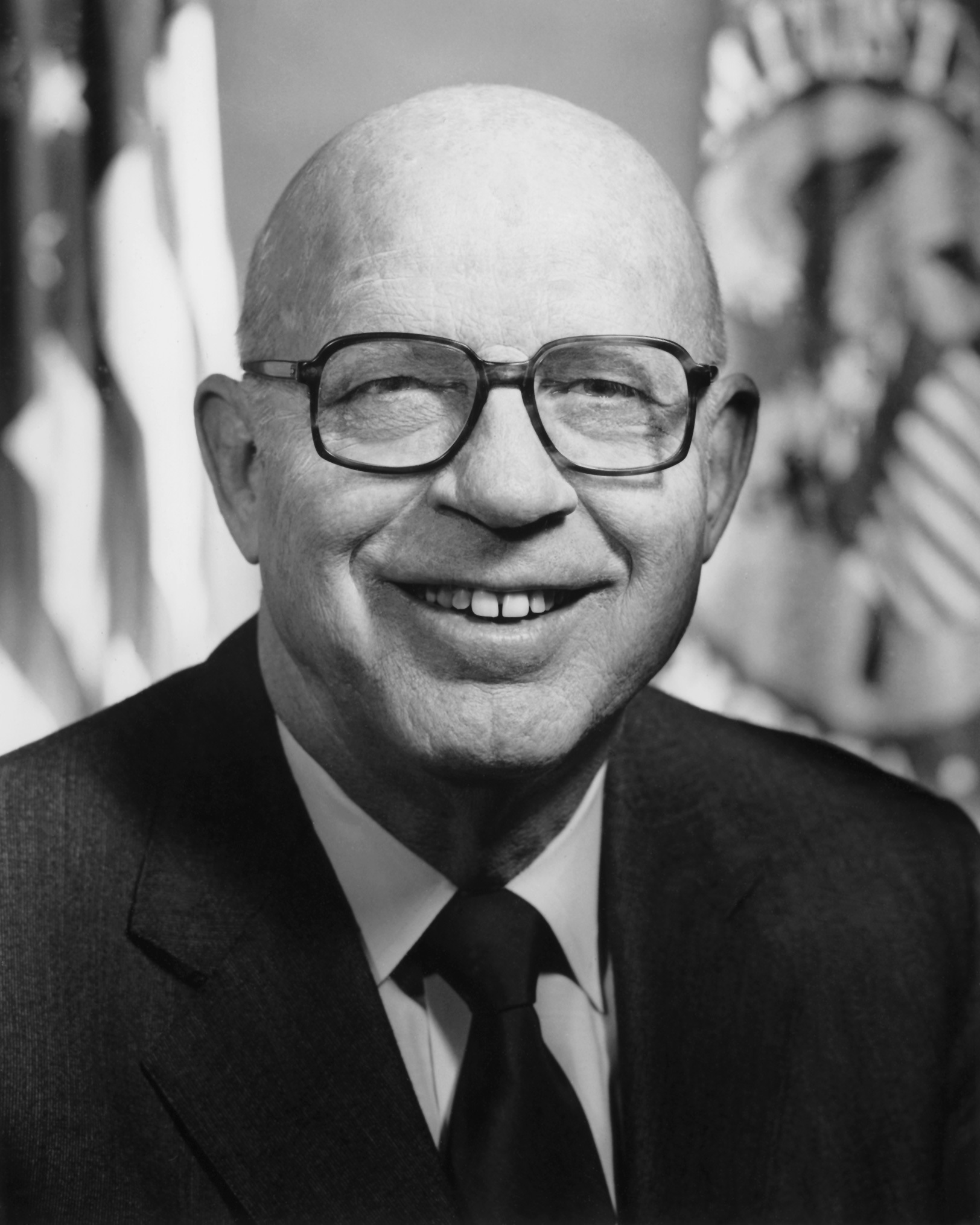

Administrator of Veterans Affairs
- In office 1986–1989
- President: Ronald Reagan
- Preceded by: Harry N. Walters
- Succeeded by: Ed Derwinski

6th Director of the Selective Service System
- In office October 30, 1981 – March 23, 1986
- President: Ronald Reagan
- Preceded by: Bernard D. Rostker; James G. Bond (acting)
- Succeeded by: Samuel K. Lessey Jr. Wilfred L. Ebel (acting)

Personal details
- Born: June 27, 1923 Conroe, Texas, U.S.
- Died: December 10, 2000 (aged 77) Rancho Mirage, California, U.S.
- Spouse: Jane Adams
- Education: University of California, Los Angeles (BS); George Washington University (MA)

Military service
- Allegiance: United States
- Branch/service: United States Army
- Years of service: 1942–1981
- Rank: Major General
- Commands: 40th Infantry Division
- Battles/wars: World War II; Korean War
- Awards: Distinguished Service Medal; Defense Superior Service Medal; Legion of Merit (2); Bronze Star Medal; Meritorious Service Medal

Thomas K. Turnage (June 27, 1923 – December 10, 2000) served as the last Administrator of Veterans Affairs before the creation of the United States Department of Veterans Affairs. He previously served as the 6th Director of the Selective Service System from October 1981 to March 1986. Turnage was also a retired major general in the California Army National Guard who commanded the 40th Infantry Division from August 1974 to August 1975 and again from December 1977 to November 1979.

== Early life and education ==
Born in Conroe, Texas, Turnage attended schools in Houston, graduating from Jackson Junior High School in 1937 and Austin Senior High School in 1940. He then attended the Allen Military Academy in Bryan, Texas, graduating in May 1942 and receiving a commission as a second lieutenant in the United States Army Reserve. Turnage continued his education at Texas A&M College until called to active duty in July 1943.

After World War II, Turnage enrolled at the University of California, Los Angeles and earned a B.S. degree in marketing in 1950. He later earned an M.A. degree in international relations from The George Washington University in 1965. Turnage graduated from courses at the Army Command and General Staff College in 1957, Army War College in 1965 and the Harvard Kennedy School in 1983.

== Military career ==
Assigned to the 386th Infantry Regiment, 97th Infantry Division, Turnage served as a platoon leader in Europe in 1945. After the end of the war in the Pacific, he served as a company commander in Japan and Korea until 1946. Released from active duty in November 1946, Turnage remained in the Army Reserve until joining the California Army National Guard in May 1949.

Turnage next served as a company commander in the 223rd Infantry Regiment, 40th Infantry Division. He deployed overseas again when the division was activated for service during the Korean War. Returning to California in 1952, Turnage served as an infantry battalion commander and then in positions of increasing responsibility within the Army National Guard. He helped supervise the military response to the 1965 Watts neighborhood riots in Los Angeles.

Turnage was promoted to brigadier general on December 10, 1968. He earned the nickname "Terrible Tom" while working to establish efficient operations at California Army National Guard headquarters. Turnage was promoted to major general on June 25, 1974 prior to assuming command of the 40th Infantry Division in August. His final military assignment was as special assistant to the Deputy Assistant Secretary in the Office for Reserve Affairs at the Pentagon.

== Later career ==
President Ronald Reagan nominated Turnage to be the Director of Selective Service on July 31, 1981. Turnage appeared for a hearing before the Senate Committee on Armed Services on September 24, 1981 and was confirmed by unanimous consent of the full Senate the following day. He retired from military service prior to taking the oath of office on October 30, 1981.

President Reagan nominated Turnage to be the Administrator of Veterans Affairs on March 10, 1986. His confirmation hearing before the Senate Committee on Veterans Affairs was held on March 18, 1986. He was confirmed by voice vote of the full Senate three days later. As administrator, Turnage was instrumental in shaping the October 1988 legislation that created the cabinet-level Department of Veterans Affairs.

== Personal life ==
Turnage married actress Betty Jane "B.J." (Bierce) Smith in 1945. Her first husband, a 1938 U.S. Naval Academy graduate, was missing in action after the 1942 sinking of the USS Wasp and had been declared dead a year later. Turnage was on leave between his return from the war in Europe and his fourteen-month postwar redeployment to the Western Pacific. The couple had a son, daughter and four grandchildren.

After leaving federal government service in 1989, Turnage and his wife moved to Rancho Mirage, California. He died from cancer at his home and was interred at Arlington National Cemetery on December 28, 2000.
