= U.S. Department of Veterans Affairs, Office of Inspector General =

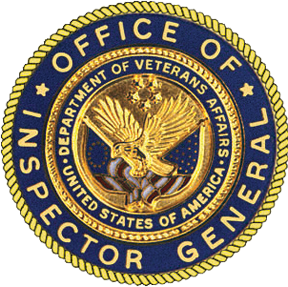
- Formed: 1978
- Headquarters: Washington, D.C.
- Parent agency: U.S. Department of Veterans Affairs
- Inspector General: Cheryl L. Mason
- Website: www.va.gov/oig/

The U.S. Department of Veterans Affairs Office of Inspector General (VA OIG) is one of the Inspector General offices created by the Inspector General Act of 1978. The Inspector General for the Department of Veterans Affairs is charged with investigating and auditing department programs to combat waste, fraud, and abuse.

== History of Inspectors General ==
| Inspector General | Appointment Date |
|---|---|
| Cheryl L. Mason | August 4, 2025 |
| David Case (Acting) | January 24, 2025 |
| Michael J. Missal | May 2, 2016 |
| Linda Halliday (Acting) | July 6, 2015 |
| Richard J. Griffin (Acting) | January 1, 2014 |
| George J. Opfer | November 17, 2005 |
| Jon A. Wooditch (Acting) | June 22, 2005 |
| Richard J. Griffin | November 11, 1997 |
| William Merriman (Acting) | January 3, 1996 |
| Stephen A. Trodden | August 4, 1990 |
| Renald P. Morani | January 1, 1988 |
| Frank S. Sato | July 31, 1981 |
| Morris B. Silverstein (Acting) | January 21, 1981 |
| Allan L. Reynolds | May 1, 1979 |
| John J. Williams (Acting Deputy IG) | November 9, 1977 |
