= Administrator of Veterans Affairs =

Head of the VA before it was a department

The administrator of veterans affairs was the head of the Veterans Administration, a United States government agency responsible for military veterans benefits. The administrator was appointed by the president. In 1989, the Veterans Administration was replaced by the United States Department of Veterans Affairs, with the secretary of veterans affairs (a member of the cabinet) as its head. The last VA administrator, Ed Derwinski, went on to become the first secretary of veterans affairs.

== List of officeholders ==
=== Directors of the Veterans Bureau ===
Before the VA was established on July 21, 1930, its functions were carried out by the U.S. Veterans’ Bureau, the Bureau of Pensions of the Interior Department, and the National Home for Disabled Volunteer Soldiers. The director of the Veterans' Bureau corresponds somewhat with the later position of administrator.

Image	Name	Start	End	President(s)
	Charles Forbes	August 9, 1921	February 28, 1923	Warren G. Harding (1921–1923)
	Frank Hines	March 2, 1923	July 21, 1930	Warren G. Harding (1921–1923)
	Frank Hines	March 2, 1923	July 21, 1930	Calvin Coolidge (1923–1929)
	Frank Hines	March 2, 1923	July 21, 1930	Herbert Hoover (1929–1933)

=== Administrators of Veterans Affairs ===
Image	Name	Start	End	President(s)
	Frank Hines	July 21, 1930	August 15, 1945	Herbert Hoover (1929–1933)
	Frank Hines	July 21, 1930	August 15, 1945	Franklin D. Roosevelt (1933–1945)
	Frank Hines	July 21, 1930	August 15, 1945	Harry S. Truman (1945–1953)
	Omar Bradley	August 15, 1945	November 30, 1947	Harry S. Truman (1945–1953)
	Carl Gray	January 1, 1948	June 30, 1953	Harry S. Truman (1945–1953)
	Harvey Higley	July 22, 1953	November 13, 1957	Dwight D. Eisenhower (1953–1961)
	Sumner Whittier	December 18, 1957	January 20, 1961	Dwight D. Eisenhower (1953–1961)
	John Gleason	January 30, 1961	January 1, 1965	John F. Kennedy (1961–1963)
	John Gleason	January 30, 1961	January 1, 1965	Lyndon B. Johnson (1963–1969)
	William Driver	January 1, 1965	May 31, 1969	Lyndon B. Johnson (1963–1969)
	William Driver	January 1, 1965	May 31, 1969	Richard Nixon (1969–1974)
	Donald Johnson	June 23, 1969	October 12, 1974	Richard Nixon (1969–1974)
	Donald Johnson	June 23, 1969	October 12, 1974	Gerald Ford (1974–1977)
	Richard Roudebush	October 12, 1974	January 20, 1977	Gerald Ford (1974–1977)
	Max Cleland	January 20, 1977	January 20, 1981	Jimmy Carter (1977–1981)
	Bob Nimmo	July 15, 1981	January 5, 1983	Ronald Reagan (1981–1989)
	Harry Walters	January 5, 1983	March 21, 1986	Ronald Reagan (1981–1989)
	Thomas Turnage	March 21, 1986	January 20, 1989	Ronald Reagan (1981–1989)
	Ed Derwinski	January 21, 1989	March 15, 1989	George H. W. Bush (1989–1993)
