= Carl R. Gray Jr. =

United States Army general

3rd Administrator of Veterans Affairs
- In office January 1, 1948 – June 30, 1953
- President: Harry S. Truman; Dwight D. Eisenhower
- Preceded by: Omar Bradley
- Succeeded by: Harvey V. Higley

Personal details
- Born: Carl Raymond Gray Jr. April 14, 1889 Wichita, Kansas, U.S.
- Died: December 2, 1955 (aged 66) Saint Paul, Minnesota, U.S.
- Party: Democratic
- Parent: Carl Raymond Gray (father)

Military service
- Allegiance: United States
- Branch/service: United States Army
- Years of service: 1917–1953
- Rank: Major General
- Unit: United States Army Corps of Engineers
- Commands: 1st Military Railway Service
- Battles/wars: World War I; World War II; Italian campaign; Southern France campaign; Western Allied invasion of Germany
- Awards: Army Distinguished Service Medal; Legion of Merit (2); Bronze Star; Army Commendation Ribbon; Knight Commander of the Order of the British Empire; Grand Officer of the Order of the Crown of Italy; Croix de Guerre with 2 Bronze Palms; Officer of the Order of the Crown; War Merit Cross

Carl Raymond Gray Jr. (April 14, 1889 – December 2, 1955) was an American United States Army general who served as the Administrator of Veterans Affairs from 1948 to 1953. Professionally a railroad executive, he was called to active duty and confirmed by the Senate as a major general in May 1942. He would command the Military Railways in North Africa, then Italy, then southern France through February 1945, and then Director-General of Military Railway Service, US European Theater of Operations through October 1945.

Political offices
Preceded by Omar Bradley	Administrator of Veterans Affairs; 1948–1953	Succeeded by Harvey V. Higley
