= Pandemic Response Accountability Committee =

U.S. committee overseeing COVID-19 spending

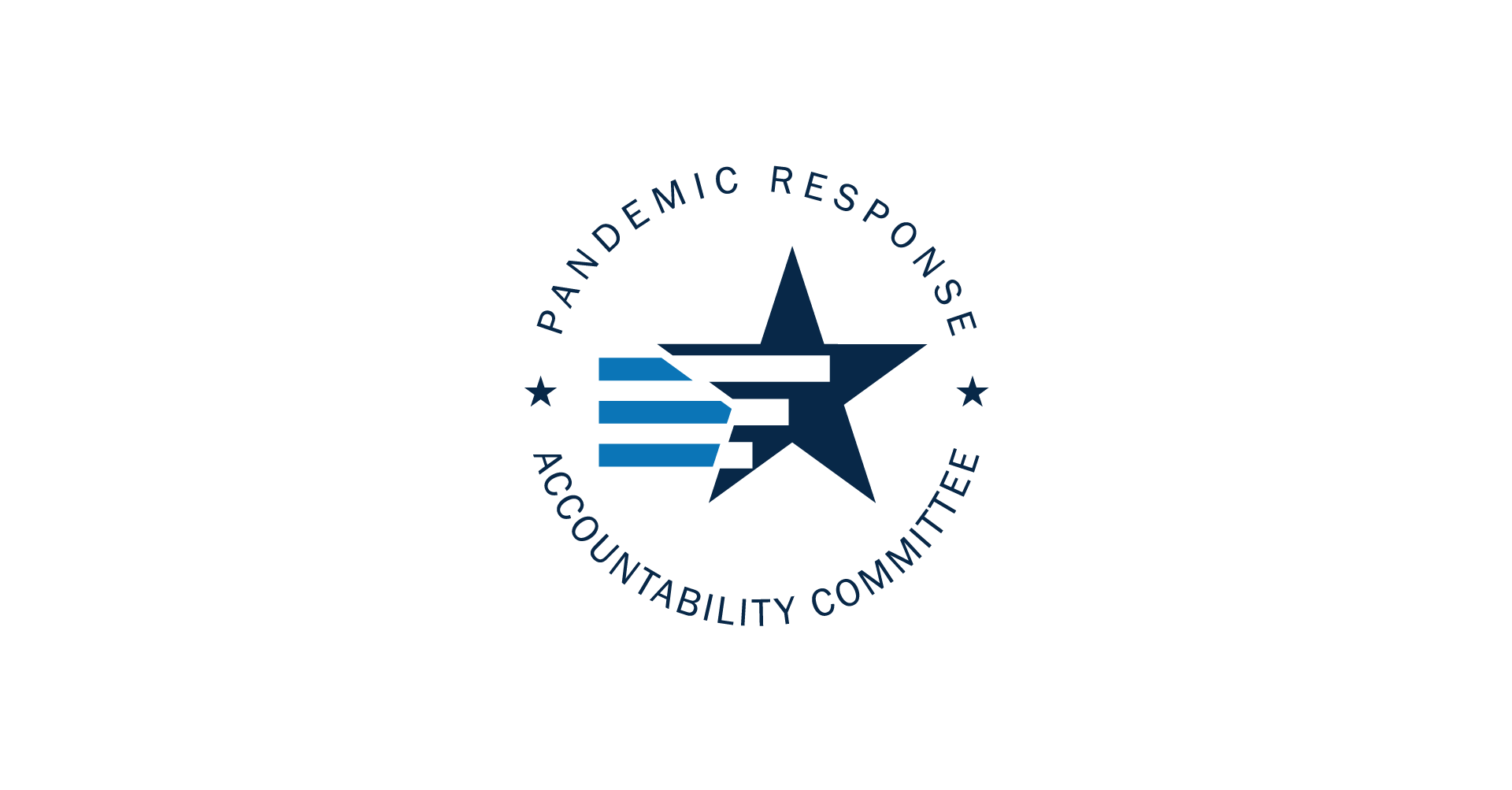

Committee overview
- Jurisdiction: United States
- Committee executives: Michael E. Horowitz, Chair; Paul K. Martin, Vice Chair
- Parent body: Council of the Inspectors General on Integrity and Efficiency
- Website: www.pandemicoversight.gov

The Pandemic Response Accountability Committee (PRAC) is an independent oversight committee within the Council of the Inspectors General on Integrity and Efficiency, created by the Coronavirus Aid, Relief, and Economic Security (CARES) Act of 2020 to ensure that the $2.2 trillion of the CARES act, plus 5 other pandemic-related pieces of legislation totaling over $5 trillion in government funds, were not misspent.

== Creation ==
The provision creating the PRAC, Section 15010, was offered by Rep. Carolyn Maloney (D-NY), Chair of the United States House Committee on Oversight and Reform, and Sen. Gary Peters (D-MI), Ranking Member of the United States Senate Committee on Homeland Security and Governmental Affairs. The CARES Act also specified a new position of Special Inspector General for Pandemic Recovery within the United States Department of the Treasury. President Donald Trump signed the legislation into law on March 27, 2020, but objected to stipulations that involved congressional oversight citing constitutional concerns regarding separation of powers.

The PRAC was created within the Council of the Inspectors General on Integrity and Efficiency (CIGIE). On April 1, 2020, the CIGIE released a statement that, "The PRAC will promote transparency and support independent oversight of the funds provided by the CARES Act and two prior emergency spending bills, the Coronavirus Preparedness and Response Supplemental Appropriations Act and the Families First Coronavirus Response Act" and, more generally, "prevent and detect fraud, waste, abuse, and mismanagement [and] mitigate major risks that cut across program and agency boundaries."

== History ==
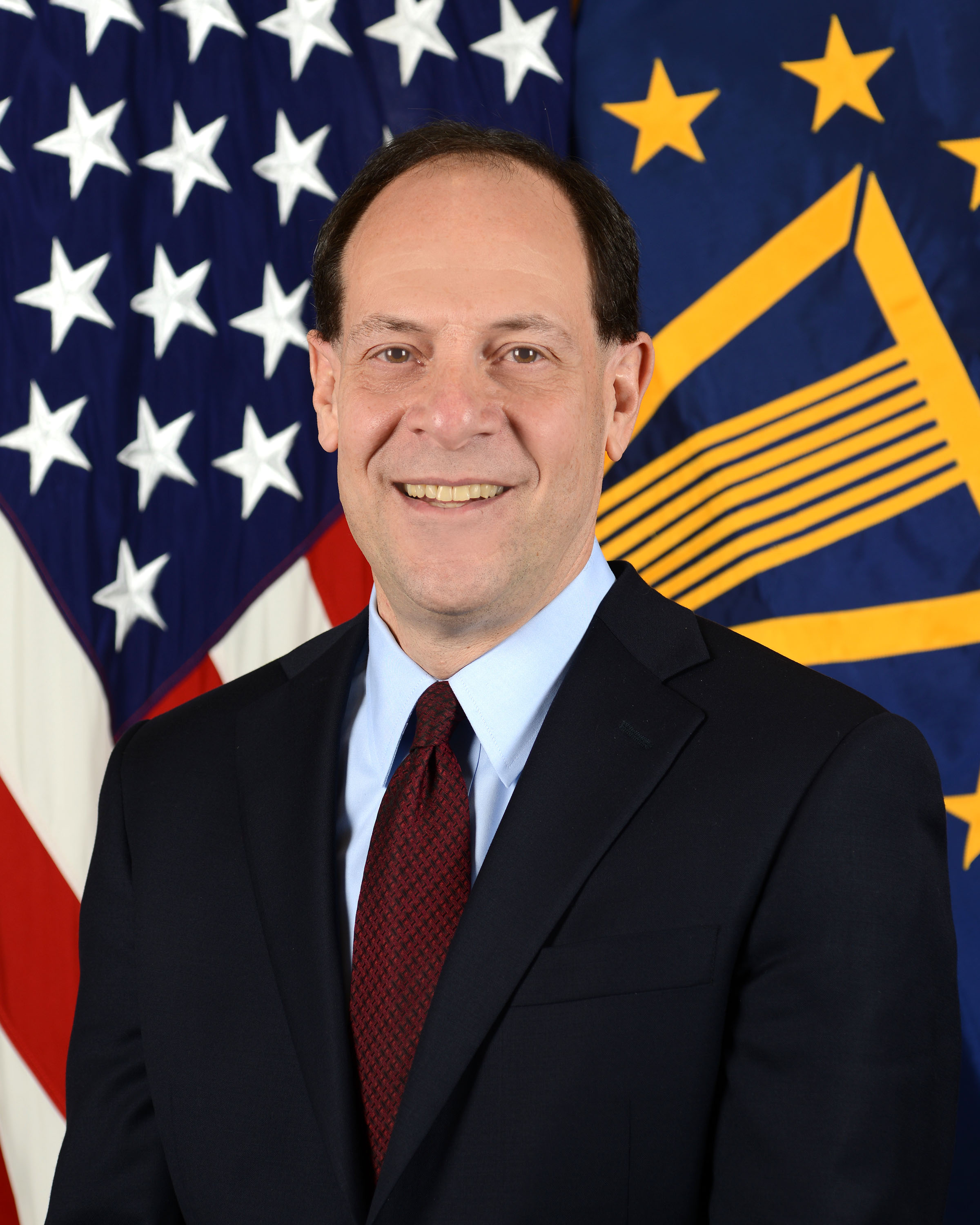
Glenn A. Fine was the first chair of the PRAC. President Trump's dismissal of Fine as Acting IG for the Defense Department made him ineligible to serve on the PRAC eight days after his appointment.

On March 30, 2020, Michael E. Horowitz, chair of the CIGIE and Inspector General of the United States Department of Justice, as authorized by the CARE Act, appointed Glenn A. Fine, acting Inspector General of the U.S. Department of Defense, to be the chair of the PRAC. Senate Minority Leader Chuck Schumer (D-N.Y.) praised Fine's appointment. On April 1, Horowitz and Fine announced that Paul K. Martin, Inspector General of NASA, was appointed Vice Chair of PRAC. They further announced that the nine statutory members of the PRAC would be joined by twelve non-statutory members, for a total of 21 members. In response to President Trump's removal on April 3 of Inspector General of the Intelligence Community Michael Atkinson, CIGIE Chair Horowitz stated, "The Inspector General Community will continue to conduct aggressive, independent oversight of the agencies that we oversee. This includes CIGIE’s Pandemic Response Accountability Committee and its efforts on behalf of American taxpayers, families, businesses, patients, and health care providers to ensure that over $2 trillion in emergency federal spending is being used consistently with the law’s mandate."

On April 7, 2020, President Trump removed Fine from his position as acting IG for the Defense Department. Although Fine retained his position as principal deputy IG for the Defense Department, his removal as acting IG made him ineligible to chair the PRAC. Fine, who had filled various inspector general positions for 15 years under both Democratic and Republican administrations, was not given a reason for his dismissal. Former Secretary of Defense Jim Mattis immediately released a rare public rebuke of the firing. The next day, legislation was introduced to allow Fine to continue as chair the Pandemic Response Accountability Committee, while Sens. Elizabeth Warren (D-Mass) and Richard Blumenthal (D-Conn) released a letter urging Horowitz to take the PRAC chair himself, stating, "with the exception of firing a score of Inspectors General and replacing them with handpicked toadies, there is little that President Trump can do to prevent the PRAC from doing its job of overseeing the federal government's coronavirus response." Horowitz became acting chair of the PRAC. Fine resigned from government service on May 25.

On April 27, 2020, CIGIE Chair Horowitz named Bob Westbrooks, who had been Inspector General of the Pension Benefit Guaranty Corporation from May 2015, to be the executive director responsible for day-to-day functions. Horowitz also announced a website to collect oversight data and reports conducted by the PRAC, individual IGs, and the Government Accountability Office, as stipulated in the CARES Act, as well as a Twitter account.

Former inspector general David C. Williams expressed concern that the dismissals of several inspectors general with seats on the PRAC may negatively affect the functioning of the committee. Some replacements are political appointees that will retain their current positions reporting to officials within the Trump administration. Williams expressed doubt that "the career investigators on the committee will feel comfortable discussing sensitive matters with political appointees still working in other roles within the administration" and that the PRAC may thus be of limited value.

On June 11, Horowitz and Westbrook revealed that attorneys in the Treasury Department had concluded that the Trump administration is not required to provide information about who is receiving funds under the CARES Act's Division A. The PRAC heads stated, "If this interpretation of the CARES Act were correct, it would raise questions about PRAC's authority to conduct oversight of Division A funds. This would present potentially significant transparency and oversight issues because Division A of the CARES Act includes over $1 trillion in funding." This followed the earlier refusal by Treasury Secretary Steven Mnuchin to provide the names of recipients of the Paycheck Protection Program. In response, House Oversight Committee chair Carolyn Maloney said, "If the Trump administration is committed to full cooperation and transparency with taxpayer dollars, it is unclear why it is manufacturing legal loopholes to avoid responding to legitimate oversight requests."

== Membership of the PRAC ==
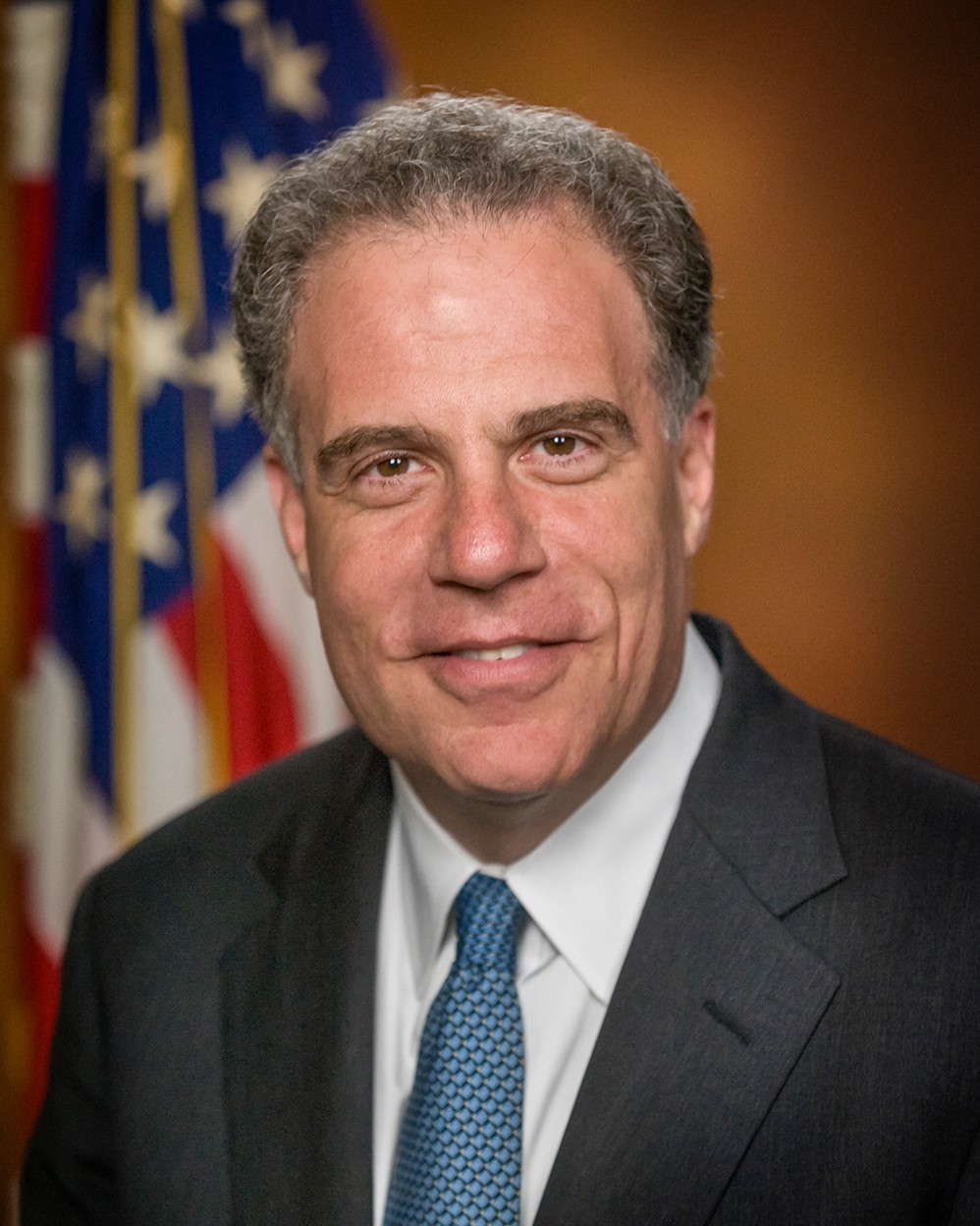
Michael E. Horowitz, Justice Department Inspector General and Chair of the PRAC

There are nine statutory inspectors general specified as PRAC members in the CARES Act.

Jurisdiction	Officeholder
Department of Defense	Robert Storch
Department of Education	Sandra Bruce
Department of Health and Human Services	Christi Grimm
Department of Homeland Security	Joseph V. Cuffari
Internal Revenue Service	J. Russell George
Department of Justice	Michael E. Horowitz, Chair
Department of Labor	Larry Turner
Small Business Administration	Mike Ware
Department of the Treasury	Richard Delmar (Acting)

On April 1, 2020, CIGIE Chair Michael Horowitz and inaugural PRAC Chair Glenn Fine announced the below additional inspectors general would serve as members of the PRAC. According to Pandamic Oversight website, Department of Interior's inspectors general is also included in PRAC.

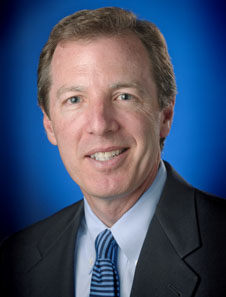
Paul K. Martin, NASA Inspector General and the Vice Chair of the PRAC

Jurisdiction	Officeholder
Department of Agriculture	Phyllis Fong
Federal Deposit Insurance Corporation	Jennifer L. Fain
Federal Reserve System	Mark Bialek
Department of Housing and Urban Development	Rae Oliver Davis
National Aeronautics and Space Administration	Paul Martin, Vice Chair
National Reconnaissance Office	Susan Gibson
National Science Foundation	Allison Lerner
Pandemic Recovery (Special)	Brian Miller
Peace Corps	Kathy Buller
Postal Service	Tammy Whitcomb
Department of Transportation	Eric J. Soskin
Department of Veterans Affairs	Michael Missal
Department of Interior	Mark Lee Greenblatt

== See also ==
- COVID-19 Congressional Oversight Commission
- Special Inspector General for Pandemic Recovery
- United States House Select Subcommittee on the Coronavirus Crisis
