= 2025 dismissals of U.S. inspectors general =

Firings by Donald Trump

On January 24, 2025, U.S. president Donald Trump announced the immediate firing of at least 17 inspectors general at federal government cabinet departments and agencies. The late-night mass dismissal raised concerns about government oversight and potential legal violations, and was called a "Friday night coup" or "Friday night purge" by media and critics.

On September 24, 2025, federal judge Ana C. Reyes ruled that the administration unlawfully fired 17 inspectors general, but refused to reinstate them, noting that Trump could simply re-fire them after providing the congressionally mandated 30 days' notice.

== Background ==
Inspectors general (IGs) serve as independent watchdogs within federal agencies, tasked with investigating allegations of fraud, waste, and abuse. Their roles are to maintain transparency and accountability within government operations. These officials are appointed to serve across different administrations and are protected under federal law, which requires the president to provide a 30-day notice to Congress before any dismissal. As of July 2014, there were 72 statutory IGs.

== The firings ==
On the night of January 24, 2025, Trump announced the immediate firing of at least 17 inspectors general, including those of the Department of Defense, State Department, Department of Housing and Urban Development, Department of Veterans Affairs, Department of Energy, and Department of Transportation. According to reports, the inspectors general were notified of their termination via email, citing "changing priorities" as the reason for their dismissal.

- Phyllis Fong, IG for USDA
- Mike Ware, IG for the Small Business Administration and Chair of Council of the Inspectors General on Integrity and Efficiency (CIGIE)
- Mark Greenblatt, IG for DOI
- Rae Oliver Davis, Inspector General of HUD, was confirmed to have been terminated
- Robert Storch, Inspector General of the Department of Defense
- Sean O'Donnell – Inspector General of the Environmental Protection Agency (EPA)
- Cardell Richardson Sr. – Inspector General of the State Department
- Christi Grimm – Inspector General of the Department of Health and Human Services (HHS)
- Michael J. Missal – Inspector General for Veterans Affairs
- Paul K. Martin, IG for USAID (fired February 11, 2025)

The Department of Justice Inspector General, Michael Horowitz, former CIGIE chair, and Department of Homeland Security Inspector General, Joseph Cuffari, were reportedly not among those fired.

== Legality ==
Storch v. Hegseth
- Court: United States District Court for the District of Columbia
- Full case name: Robert Storch; Michael J. Missal; Christi Grimm; Cardell Richardson; Sandra D. Bruce; Phyllis Fong; Larry D. Turner; Hannibal Ware v. Pete Hegseth; Doug Collins; Dorothy Fink; Marco Rubio; Denise L. Carter; Gary Washington; Vince Micone; Everett Woodel; Donald Trump
- Started: February 12, 2025
- Docket nos.: 1:25-cv-00415

Court membership
- Judge sitting: Ana C. Reyes

Federal law mandates a 30-day notice to Congress before removing an inspector general.

Experts have said the dismissals may violate the Inspector General Act of 1978, which lays out the process for removing inspectors general. Hannibal Ware, the Inspector General for the Small Business Administration, sent a letter to the White House Office of Presidential Personnel, urging them to reconsider the decision and comply with legal procedures.

On February 12, 2025, eight of the fired inspectors general sued.

On September 24, 2025, federal judge Ana C. Reyes ruled that the administration unlawfully fired 17 inspectors general, but refused to reinstate them, saying that Trump would likely re-fire them after providing a congressionally mandated 30 days' notice.

== Reactions ==
House Democrats condemned the firings in a letter to Trump, characterizing them as an "attack on transparency and accountability". Representative Gerry Connolly, Ranking Member of the House Committee on Oversight and Government Reform, described the action as a "Friday night coup," further stating that it undermines public trust in government institutions. Representative Angie Craig echoed these concerns, particularly highlighting the dismissal of the inspector general at the Department of Agriculture, noting that such actions threaten the integrity of programs supporting farmers and nutrition assistance.

Republican lawmakers, including Senator Chuck Grassley and Senator Susan Collins, also voiced concerns. Collins said, "I don't understand why one would fire individuals whose mission it is to root out waste, fraud and abuse."

On February 13, 2025, The New York Times revealed that Phyllis Fong, the fired inspector for the Department of Agriculture, was conducting an investigation into Elon Musk's brain implant startup, Neuralink. This company had allegedly mistreated dozens of test monkeys that later had to be euthanized. "Musk misled investors about the safety and marketability of the company's device" said Ryan Merkley, director of research advocacy with the Physicians Committee for Responsible Medicine. The non-profit was the originator of the complaint to the USDA and of a second complaint to the Securities Exchange Commission. The SEC was also conducting an investigation into Neuralink as of the change of leadership in January 2025.

== See also ==
- 2020 dismissals of inspectors general
- 2025 U.S. Department of Justice resignations
- 2025 United States federal mass layoffs
