= Paul K. Martin =

American lawyer and former USAID Inspector General

Paul Martin
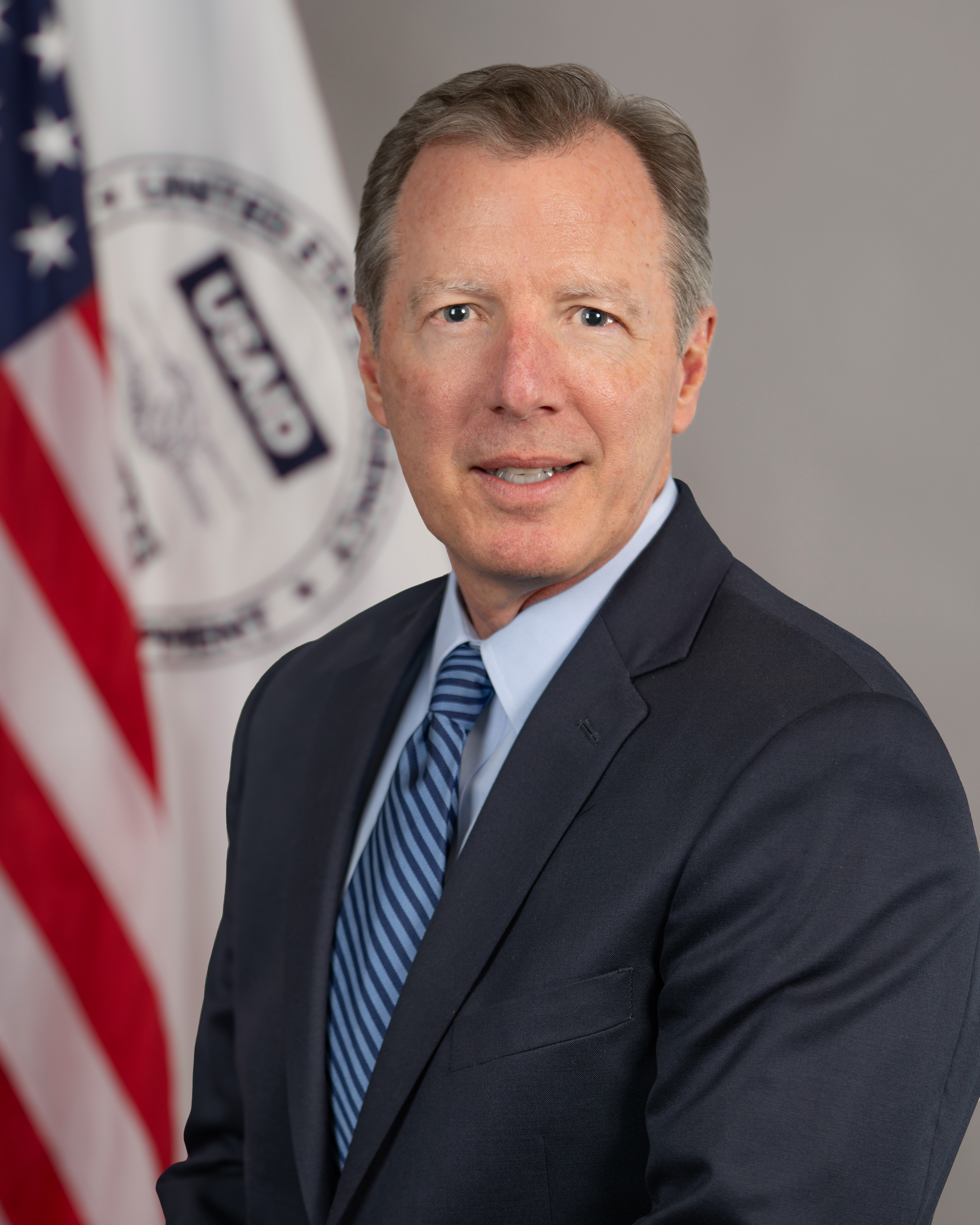

Inspector General of the U.S. Agency for International Development
- In office January 2, 2024 – February 11, 2025
- President: Joe Biden; Donald Trump
- Preceded by: Nicole Angarella (acting)
- Succeeded by: Marc Meyer (acting)

Vice Chair of the Pandemic Response Accountability Committee
- Incumbent
- Assumed office April 1, 2020
- President: Donald Trump; Joe Biden; Donald Trump
- Preceded by: Position established

Inspector General of the National Aeronautics and Space Administration
- In office November 20, 2009 – January 2, 2024
- President: Barack Obama; Donald Trump; Joe Biden
- Preceded by: Thomas Howard (Acting)
- Succeeded by: George Scott (Acting)

Personal details
- Education: Pennsylvania State University (BA); Georgetown University (JD)

Paul K. Martin is an American lawyer and former Inspector General of the U.S. Agency for International Development. After Martin published a report critical of the Trump administration's dismantling of USAID, he was removed from his position on February 11, 2025. He previously served as Inspector General of the National Aeronautics and Space Administration from 2009 to 2024, having been confirmed U.S. Senate for that position on November 20, 2009. He was also appointed Vice Chair of the Pandemic Response Accountability Committee on April 1, 2020 by Council of the Inspectors General on Integrity and Efficiency Chair Michael E. Horowitz, per the provisions of the Coronavirus Aid, Relief, and Economic Security (CARES) Act.

== Biography ==
Martin has a B.A. in Journalism from Pennsylvania State University and a J.D. from the Georgetown University Law Center. He began his career as a reporter for The Greenville News, a newspaper in Greenville, South Carolina. He joined the United States Sentencing Commission after its creation in 1985 and assisted in developing the first iteration of Federal Sentencing Guidelines. Martin spent a total of 13 years at the Commission, including six years as Deputy Staff Director.

From 1998 to 2001, Martin was the Special Counsel to the Office of the Inspector General of the U.S. Department of Justice, and then Counsel from 2001 to 2003. He then served as Deputy Inspector General at the Department of Justice, before being confirmed by the U.S. Senate to be the NASA Inspector General on November 20, 2009. Martin described the balance between auditing and working with NASA as "sort of like straddling a barbed-wire fence." As NASA IG, Martin advocated for improved governance of information technology security standards at the agency.

== Advisory Notice and Termination as IG of USAID ==
Martin was terminated from his position as IG of USAID on February 11, 2025 a day after releasing an Advisory Notice detailing how $489 million worth of food assistance was at risk of diversion and spoilage as a result of the suspension of USAID programs in response to Presidential Executive Order 14169. Among other things, the Advisory Notice brought to light that the halt of funding to USAID would jeopardize lucrative, taxpayer funded, government contracts provided to farmers across the country that supply harvested crops that are sent overseas to feed the hungry. Politicians are looking to move this taxpayer funded program, that provides food to citizens of other countries at no cost, to the Department of Agriculture, instead of eliminating the program altogether, or figuring out how this excess food production capacity could be used to feed the hungry in the USA or reduce food price inflation.

As Inspector General of USAID, Martin said on February 10, 2025 that the dismantling of USAID had left oversight of $8.2 billion in unspent humanitarian aid "largely nonoperational", also noting the impact of USAID's shutdown on its "capacity to disburse and safeguard its humanitarian assistance programming". He was fired the next day, with no official reason given. The Inspector General Act of 1978 requires that Congress be given 30 days of notice before inspectors general are fired; the law was amended in 2022 to further require a "substantive rationale, including detailed and case-specific reasons".
