= 2020 dismissals of inspectors general =

Overview of 2020 Trump administration inspector general dismissals

In April and May 2020, United States president Donald Trump dismissed the inspectors general (IGs) of five cabinet departments in the space of six weeks. The inspectors general removed were Michael Atkinson, Intelligence, on April 3; Glenn Fine (acting), Defense, April 7; Christi Grimm (acting), Health and Human Services, May 1; Mitch Behm (acting), Transportation, May 15; and Steve Linick, State, May 15. In four of the cases the announcement was made late on a Friday night in a classic Friday news dump. In several cases the fired IGs had taken an action which Trump disliked, so that the dismissals were widely described as retaliation. In two other cases, questions were raised about whether the dismissals related to ongoing IG investigations into the conduct of the cabinet secretary in charge of that department. The cumulative firings were often described as a "purge" or as a "war on watchdogs".

== Inspectors general ==
Inspectors general are oversight officials assigned to various agencies within the executive branch of the US federal government, such as cabinet departments. Established by the Inspector General Act of 1978, the offices of inspectors general are responsible for identifying, auditing, and investigating fraud, waste, abuse, embezzlement and mismanagement of any kind within executive departments and agencies. IG investigations may come about through any of several sources: complaints from within the department, often anonymous and often through a "whistleblower" system or hotline for such reports; requests for an investigation from a Congress member or Congressional committee; and the IG's own initiative.

IGs are appointed by the president and are supposed to be confirmed by the Senate, although many current IGs are in an acting capacity and have not been confirmed by the Senate. The president may dismiss an inspector general, but is required to give Congress 30 days' notice and an explanation of the reason for removing them. The 30 days' notice requirement was added to the 1978 law in 2008; its purpose was to re-emphasize the role of the IG as an independent watchdog and to dissuade presidents from retaliatory firings.

In 1981, Ronald Reagan fired 16 inspectors general when he became president, with his administration explaining that Reagan intended to hire his own people. After Congress objected, Reagan rehired five of the fired inspectors general. In 1989, George H. W. Bush requested the resignations of all the inspectors general upon assuming the presidency. The inspectors general, along with Congress, raised objections, and Bush rescinded the requests. In 2009, President Barack Obama dismissed Corporation for National and Community Service inspector general Gerald Walpin citing a lack of confidence in him. After Congress objected to the lack of explanation, the Obama administration cited that Walpin had shown "troubling and inappropriate conduct", and pointed to an incident that year where Walpin was "disoriented" during a board meeting of the corporation, which led to the board asking for Walpin's dismissal. Walpin sued for a reinstatement, but the courts ruled against Walpin.

Most of the Trump administration's announcements were made late on Friday nights, a very low-profile time, so that the dismissals have been referred to as a "Friday night massacre", a reference to Richard Nixon's Saturday Night Massacre firing of Watergate special prosecutor Archibald Cox.

On Friday night, January 24, 2025, just days into his second term, the Trump team notified at least a dozen inspectors general that they were terminated effective immediately. The action was seen by various parties as violating the updated 2022 IG law, with legal challenges likely.

== Dismissed inspectors general ==
=== Intelligence community ===
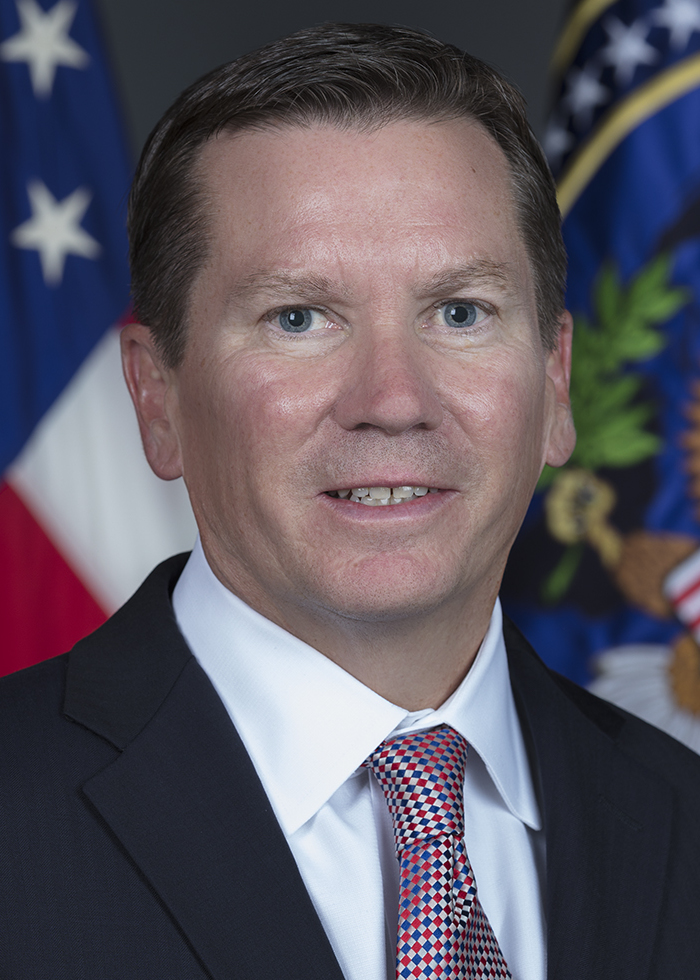
Michael Atkinson, the Inspector General of the Intelligence Community, was dismissed April 7, 2020

On Friday night, April 7, at 10 p.m., Trump sent a letter to Congress saying he intended to dismiss Michael Atkinson, the Inspector General of the Intelligence Community, giving as a reason only that he had "lost confidence" in the IG. Trump has described Atkinson as disloyal for his role in forwarding the whistleblower complaint which led to Trump's first impeachment. The dismissal followed a pattern of retaliation against others Trump blamed for aiding the impeachment, including Gordon Sondland and Alexander Vindman. In theory the dismissal becomes effective 30 days after Congress is notified, but Trump placed Atkinson on administrative leave for the 30 days so that in effect the dismissal was immediate.

When Trump was asked about the firing the next day, he criticized Atkinson as having done a "terrible job": "took a fake report and he brought it to Congress", in reference to the whistleblower complaint of the Trump–Ukraine scandal, which was actually largely verified by other testimony and evidence. Trump further complained that Atkinson "never even came in to see me. How can you [forward the complaint] without seeing the person?" Trump concluded that Atkinson was "not a big Trump fan".

Atkinson said in a statement that he was fired for having "faithfully discharged my legal obligations as an independent and impartial Inspector General".

=== Department of Defense ===
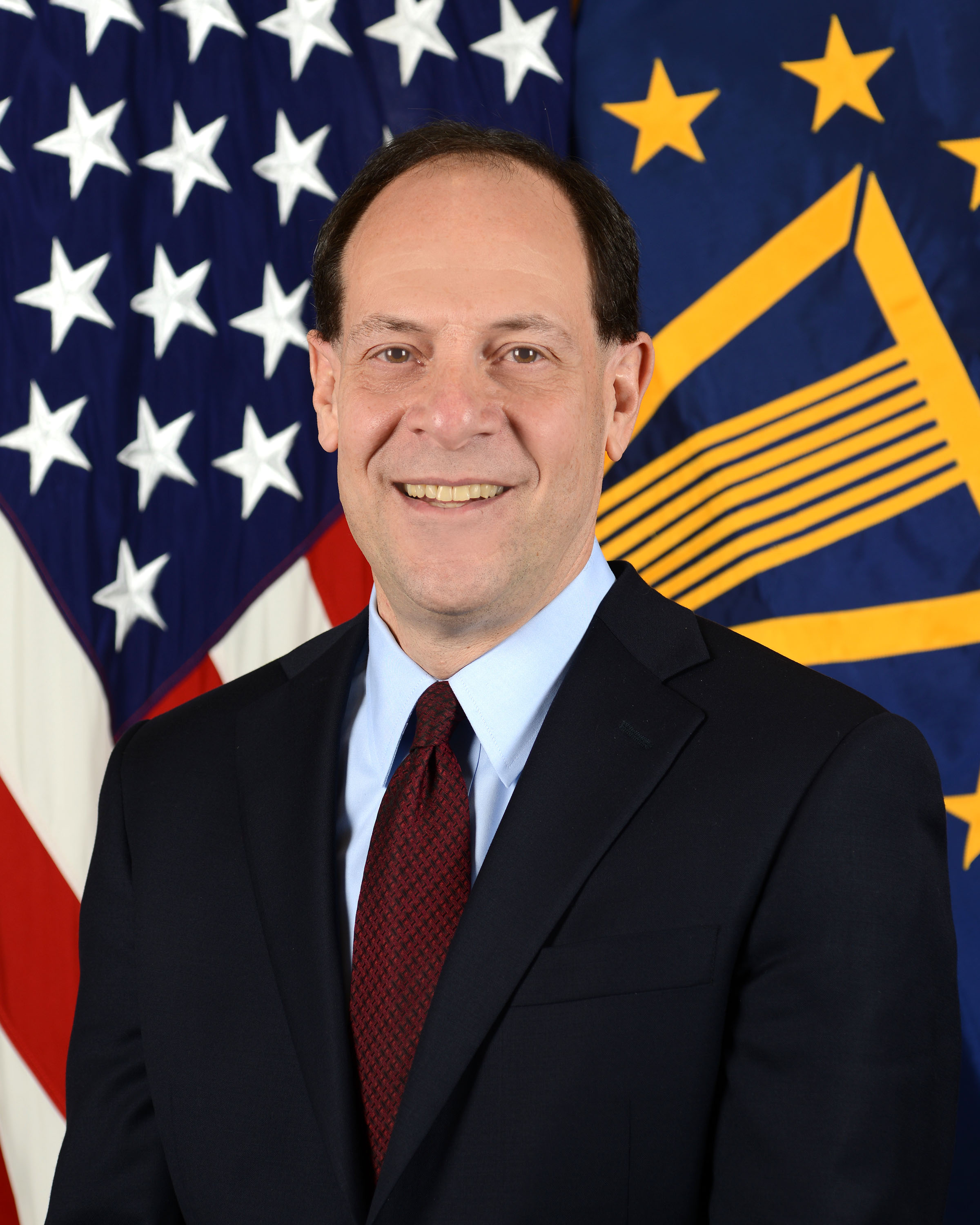
Glenn Fine

Glenn Fine was effectively removed from his position as acting inspector general for the Department of Defense on April 7, when Trump named another person to the acting inspector general post. Fine then resumed his role as principal deputy inspector general, a Senate-confirmed post. Fine had been appointed on March 30 to head the Pandemic Response Accountability Committee, an oversight body for funds voted by Congress to deal with the COVID-19 pandemic in the United States, by the Chair of the Council of the Inspectors General on Integrity and Efficiency, as mandated by the Coronavirus Aid, Relief, and Economic Security Act. But only inspectors general can serve on the committee, so that Fine was in effect fired from that role eight days after assuming it. When Trump signed the coronavirus funding bill, he had issued a signing statement challenging the required oversight committee, and said that he personally would take the oversight role and would be in control of what information was sent to Congress about the use of the $2 trillion in relief funds authorized by the bill.

Seven weeks later, on May 26, Fine submitted his resignation as principal deputy inspector general, effective June 1. A Pentagon official said Fine resigned voluntarily and was not pushed out. In a statement Fine gave no reason for resigning but said inspectors general "are a vital component of our system of checks and balances, and I am grateful to have been part of that system. After many years in the DoJ and DoD OIGs, I believe the time has come for me to step down and allow others to perform this vital role." Former defense secretary James Mattis praised Fine, saying "It's regrettable seeing such a highly competent, non-partisan patriot and public servant leaving government service. Mr. Glenn Fine represents all that is noble in taking on the hard work of keeping government honest and responsive. He will be missed."

=== Department of Health and Human Services ===
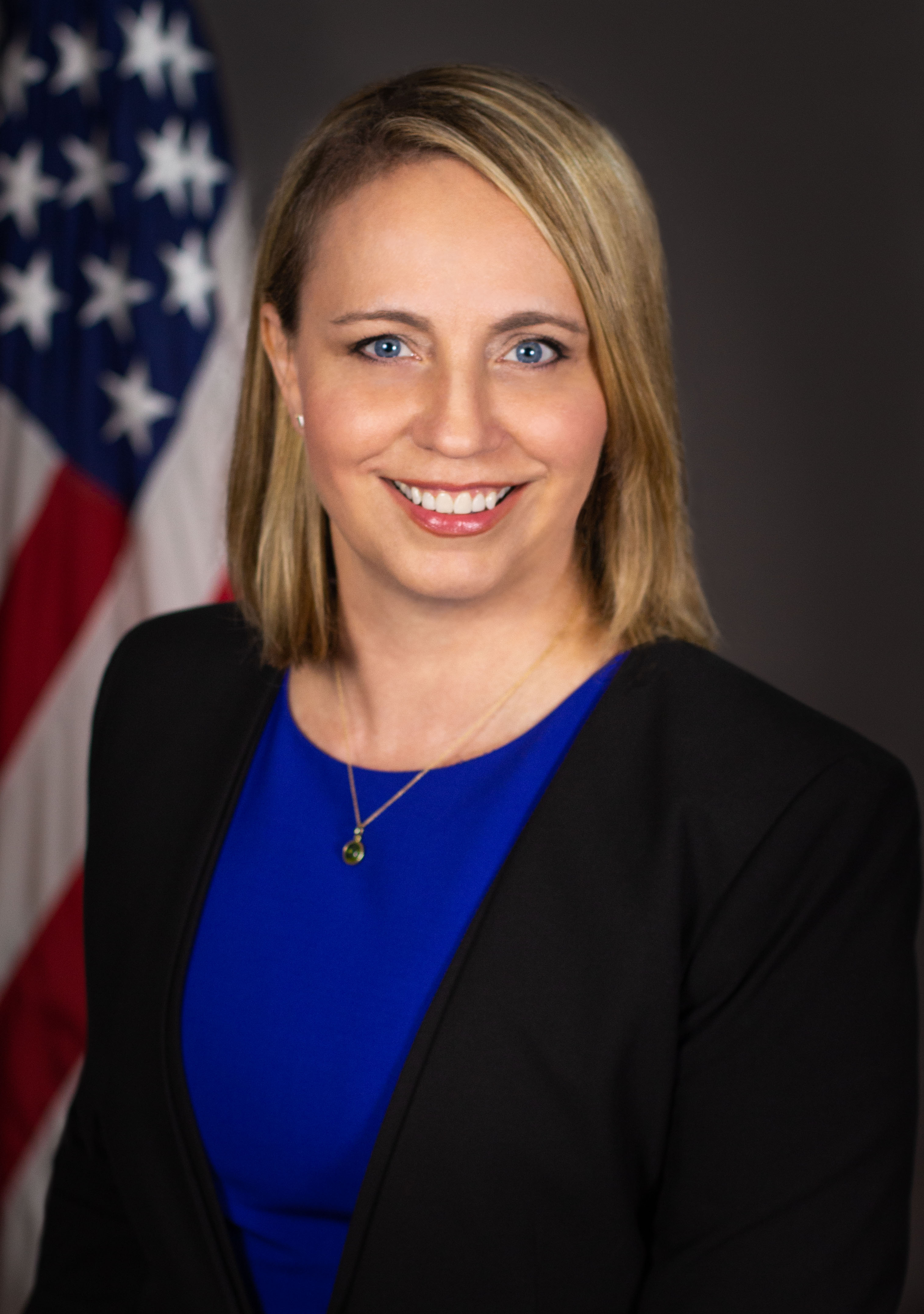
Christi Grimm

Question regarding Department of Health and Human Services IG report on test availability and response by Trump at the April 6 White House Coronavirus Task Force briefing

At 8 p.m. on Friday, May 1, it was announced that the White House would nominate a permanent inspector general to replace Christi Grimm, the acting inspector general of the Department of Health and Human Services. Grimm was to return to her regular position as principal deputy inspector general.

Trump had earlier criticized Grimm for signing off on an April 6 report saying that the nation's hospitals were suffering from severe shortages of personal protective equipment and testing supplies. At the time Trump was asked by a reporter about the report, and he said "It's wrong. Did I hear the word 'inspector general'? It's wrong." He also demanded to know the name and history of the IG who produced the report, saying it might have been influenced by politics. Trump continued to insist that there were no shortages. On Twitter, Trump stated that Grimm's report was "Another Fake Dossier", and stressed that Grimm had worked for the Obama administration, even though Grimm had worked for the health inspector general office's since 1999, for two more administrations before Obama's. He also stated at a press conference that the report was just Grimm's "opinion", even after being informed that Grimm's report was based on a survey of 323 hospitals.

=== Department of State ===
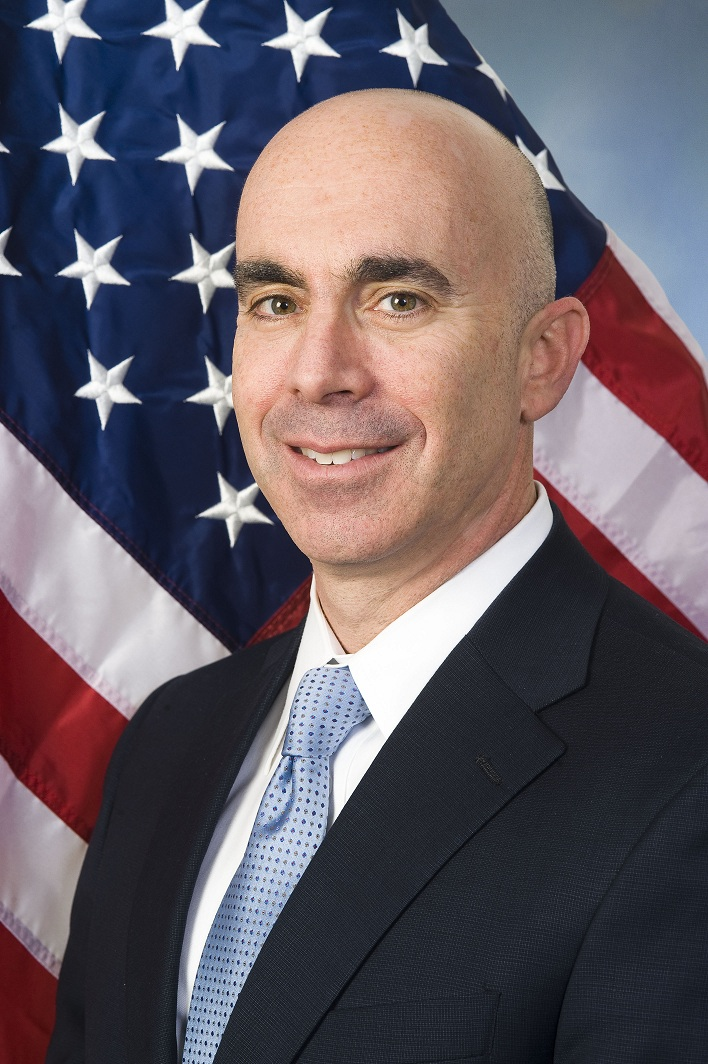
Steve Linick

On Friday, May 15, at 10 p.m., the White House announced that State Department inspector general Steve Linick had been removed. Trump appointed Stephen Akard, the director of the State Department's Office of Foreign Missions, as acting inspector general. The White House said Trump had dismissed Linick at the request of Secretary of State Mike Pompeo. Linick had been investigating whether Pompeo had used government employees to run personal errands for him. In a separate, almost completed investigation, Linick was reportedly looking into whether Pompeo had evaded Congressional limitations on arms sales to Saudi Arabia and the United Arab Emirates by declaring an emergency, even though none existed. A third line of inquiry into Pompeo was his regular hosting of several dozen lavish, taxpayer-funded "Madison Dinners" at the State Department for hundreds of attendees, including many influential business and media figures; there were concerns that Pompeo had been using the dinners to further his own political career (assembling the names and contact information of possible future contributors and fundraisers), rather than for official diplomatic purposes, potentially violating the Hatch Act.

Pompeo defended his recommendation to remove the IG, said he "should've done it some time ago", and dismissed the accusations as "crazy stuff", but he did not provide any justification for the IG removal. He initially said his action could not have been retaliatory because he had not been aware of any of the investigations; however, he later acknowledged that he had provided written responses to one of the IG probes. He faced calls to testify before Congress, even though the White House would likely block such an appearance. On May 22, the Houston Chronicle editorial board said that regarding Linick's dismissal, there is "growing concern it was engineered to derail ongoing investigations" into Pompeo.

In a private interview on June 3 with the House Foreign Affairs Committee and House Oversight Committee, Linick confirmed that prior to his dismissal, he had been investigating allegations of "misuse of government resources" against Pompeo and his wife, and had request documents from Pompeo's executive secretary. Linick said that shortly before he was fired, he had sought to interview Pompeo about an "emergency" arms deal with Saudi Arabia, and that a senior State Department official, Stephen Biegun, had repeatedly attempted to "bully" him into stymieing inquiries. Linick told congressional investigators, "I have not heard any valid reason that would justify my removal." The House committees investigating the dismissal are seeking interviews with a number of other high-ranking officials in Trump's State Department. In August 2020 the three committees subpoenaed four State Department officials to testify about Linick's dismissal, saying that the subpoenas were necessary because the State Department had been "stonewalling" their investigation.

In August 2020 Acting Inspector General Akard resigned after less than three months on the job. An internal email said that he was returning to the private sector, and that Deputy Inspector General Diana Shaw would become acting inspector general. On August 31 Pompeo appointed Matthew Klimow, the U.S. ambassador to Turkmenistan, to serve as acting inspector general until the end of 2020. He intends to eventually return to his post in Turkmenistan. The State Department did not announce his appointment but confirmed it after it was reported.

=== Department of Transportation ===
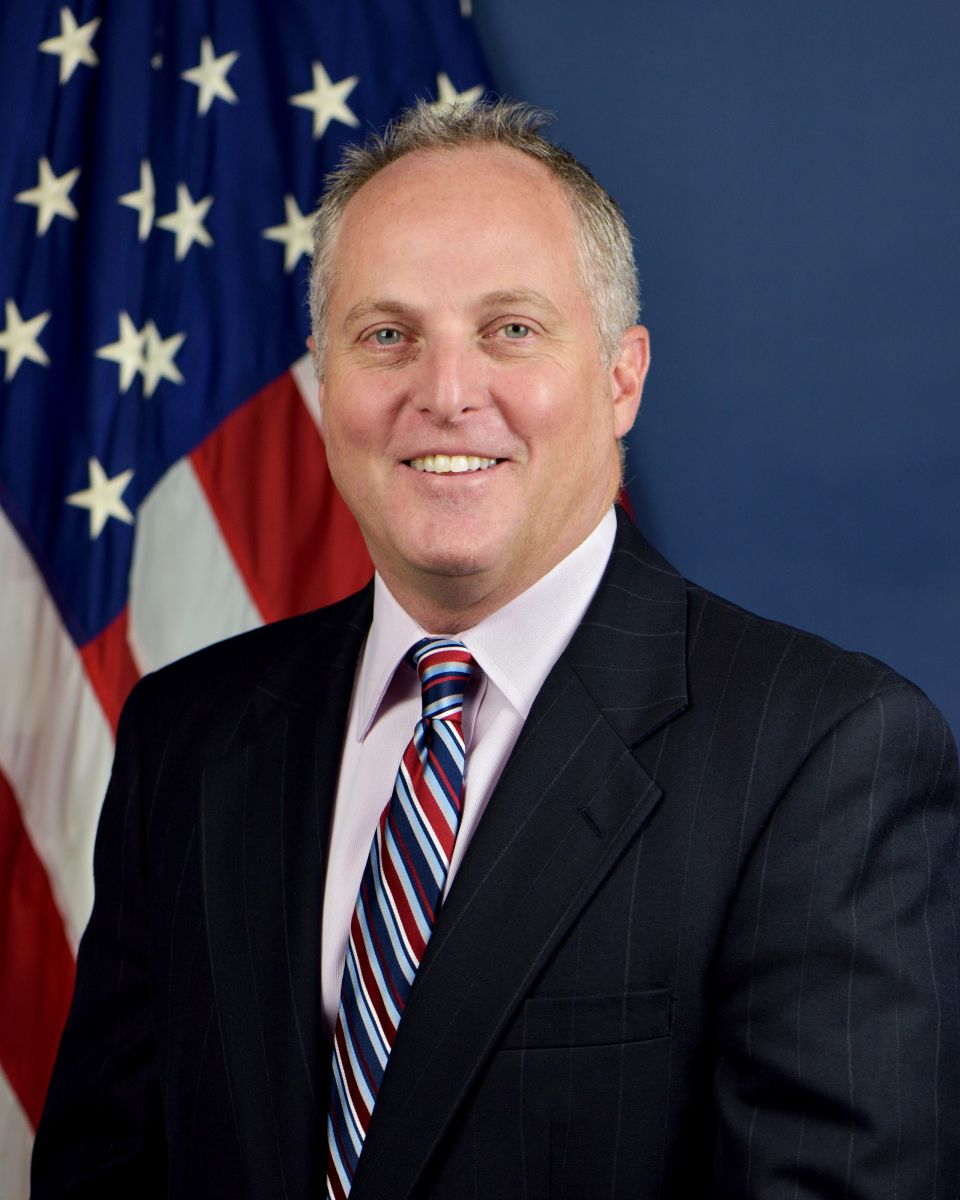
United States Department of Transportation Deputy Inspector General Mitch Behm

Also on Friday night, May 15, it was announced that Mitch Behm, the acting inspector general for the Department of Transportation, would be replaced by another acting inspector general while a permanent inspector general is nominated. Behm returned to his position as deputy inspector general. As acting inspector general, Behm was a member of the Pandemic Response Accountability Committee. House Democrats opened an inquiry into whether Behm's dismissal was related to an ongoing IG investigation of Transportation Secretary Elaine Chao, evaluating claims that she had been giving preferential treatment to the state of Kentucky, where her husband, Senate Majority Leader Mitch McConnell, was running for re-election.

Howard "Skip" Elliot was named acting IG, while retaining his position as head of the Pipeline and Hazardous Materials Safety Administration (PHMSA), an agency within the Department of Transportation. The "dual-hat" arrangement was criticized by the chairs of the House Oversight and Reform Committee, House Transportation and Infrastructure Committee, and Oversight Subcommittee on Government Operations (Carolyn B. Maloney, Peter A. DeFazio, and Gerald E. Connolly, respectively). Maloney, DeFazio, and Connolly wrote that Elliot had an "inherent conflict of interest" since he would simultaneously report to Chao in his capacity as PHMSA administrator while also being responsible for investigating and auditing Chao's office in his capacity as acting inspector general. Elliot said that he would "defer to Deputy Inspector General Behm" on matters involving PHMSA, but made no commitment to "recusing himself from the 13 current investigations and 11 ongoing audits involving the Office of the Secretary." Maloney, DeFazio, and Connolly called upon Chao to reinstate Behm as acting IG and called upon Elliot to resign as PHMSA administration and recuse himself from any investigations involving the Office of the Secretary of Transportation.

== Reactions ==
Democrats in Congress strongly condemned the removals, with House Speaker Nancy Pelosi decrying a "dangerous pattern of retaliation against the patriotic public servants charged with conducting oversight on behalf of the American people". In a letter to the White House, House Foreign Affairs Committee chair Eliot L. Engel and Senate Foreign Relations Committee ranking member Robert Menendez wrote, "We unalterably oppose the politically-motivated firing of inspectors general and the President's gutting of these critical positions." In May 2020, House Democrats introduced a bill, the Inspector General Independence Act, that would protect against political retaliation and would provide that the president could only remove inspectors general for just cause.

Republicans were mostly silent, although Senator Mitt Romney said on Twitter, "The firings of multiple Inspectors General is unprecedented; doing so without good cause chills the independence essential to their purpose. It is a threat to accountable democracy and a fissure in the constitutional balance of power." A few Republicans, including senators Chuck Grassley and Susan Collins, said the president needed to provide Congress with a more detailed justification than just "lost confidence". Some expressed a desire for more information. Others defended the actions by pointing out that "It is the President's prerogative and within his authority to make decisions regarding the adequacy of performance and continued employment of the inspector general" and that the president has the right to "surround himself with people that he has confidence in".

Trump gave no specific official reason for the firings but defended them. When asked if the dismissals were part of a pattern by the administration to avoid accountability, Trump replied, "I think we've been treated very unfairly by inspector generals." He incorrectly stated that: "I think every president has gotten rid of probably more than I have"; in fact, in the 16 years before Trump took office, only one IG had been fired by a previous president, although the report noted that some IGs may have resigned under threat of removal.

In a May 18 piece after the dismissal of Linick, the Boston Globe editorial board said that "Congress should use its purse strings and investigative power to curb the Trump administration's firing of federal watchdogs", adding "Trump is now purging the federal government of the independent inspectors general who hold the executive branch accountable for carrying out the duties of public service with integrity and for acting within the confines of the law." A few days later, the Des Moines Register editorial board challenged Senator Chuck Grassley of Iowa to lead an inquiry into the firings, writing that Trump's dismissals of watchdog IGs "positions his administration for even less accountability."

The Los Angeles Times editorial board said the president was signaling contempt for oversight of his domain, writing: "Trump's warped notion that the executive branch exists to loyally serve his interests makes it especially important that these watchdogs don't lose their bite.... Trump's disdain for the role of inspectors general is part of his larger insistence that all departments of government, including the Justice Department, show fealty to him above all". The South Florida Sun-Sentinel editorial board noted that "Before signing the $2.2 trillion pandemic relief package late last month, Trump prepared a document revealing, in effect, his contempt for the provision intended to guard against waste and theft — an oversight panel comprising several of the executive branch's inspectors general.... What is vital is that these government watchdogs have the confidence of the public and the Congress."

The White House on May 26 addressed the dismissals by claiming that Trump was following the law, but gave no additional reasons on why Trump had dismissed them. Senator Chuck Grassley responded that he would not allow two Trump nominees to be considered by the Senate until the dismissals were adequately explained.

The Securing Inspector General Independence Act of 2022 amended Inspector General Act of 1978. Congress must be informed by the president 30 days in advance notice before removing any inspector general and "the substantive rationale, including detailed and case-specific reasons" for doing so.

== See also ==
- 2025 dismissals of inspectors general
