= Bob Westbrooks =

American attorney, government watchdog

Robert A. Westbrooks

Executive Director of the Pandemic Response Accountability Committee
- In office April 27, 2020 – December 31, 2022
- Preceded by: committee created

Inspector General of the Pension Benefit Guaranty Corporation
- In office May, 2015 – April 27, 2020

Deputy Inspector General for the Small Business Administration
- In office 2013 – May, 2015

Personal details
- Born: April 28, 1966 (age 59); Maryland
- Education: American University

Robert A. (Bob) Westbrooks is an American attorney and former government executive, certified public accountant, auditor, federal agent, government watchdog, speaker and author. Westbrooks is best known for his work as an inspector general and for the transparency he provided to the American public as executive director of the Pandemic Response Accountability Committee (PRAC), an independent committee within the Council of the Inspectors General on Integrity and Efficiency (CIGIE).

PRAC was created by the Coronavirus Aid, Relief, and Economic Security (CARES) Act of 2020, and is charged with overseeing the now-$5 trillion in government spending relief efforts in response to the COVID-19 pandemic, specifically with respect to fraud, waste, abuse, and mismanagement. As of September 2021, PRAC reported an estimated $100 billion in financial benefits the government distributed were fraudulent, and over $10 billion of the $150 billion given directly to the states for local distribution has yet to be spent. The PRAC provides extensive information related to the government's financial COVID-19 relief efforts on its website, in both interactive and downloadable formats.

== Education ==
Westbrooks earned a Bachelor of Arts degree in justice from American University, and a Juris Doctor from the University of Maryland, Francis King Carey School of Law. He is a member of the Maryland bar.

== Career ==
Westbrooks began his public career as a U.S. postal inspector at the United States Postal Inspection Service. Westbrooks later worked as a special agent and agency leader at the United States Postal Service, Office of Inspector General, the Office of Inspector General for the Department of Transportation, and the National Archives and Records Administration, Office of Inspector General. He then served as Deputy Inspector General for the Small Business Administration, Office of Inspector General, until 2015.

In May 2015, Westbrooks was appointed Inspector General of the Pension Benefit Guaranty Corporation (PBGC). During his tenure of approximately five years, Westbrooks also served on the CIGIE Executive Council. On April 27, 2020, Westbrooks was appointed executive director of the Pandemic Response Accountability Committee .

Westbrooks retired from the Pandemic Response Accountability Committee in December 2022,

== Publications ==
=== Books ===
- Westbrooks, Bob (2023). Left Holding the Bag: A Watchdog's Account of How Washington Fumbled its COVID Test. Montgomery County, Maryland: Gracie House LLC. ISBN 9798988395300.
