= Executive Order 14169 =

2025 pause on all foreign aid

- "Reevaluating and Realigning United States Foreign Aid"
- Type: Executive order
- Number: 14169
- President: Donald Trump
- Signed: January 20, 2025

Federal Register details
- Federal Register document number: 2025-02091
- Publication date: January 30, 2025

Executive Order 14169, titled "Reevaluating and Realigning United States Foreign Aid", is an executive order signed by U.S. president Donald Trump hours after he took office January 20, 2025, ordering a 90-day pause on all U.S. foreign development assistance programs in order to conduct a review. On January 24, the U.S. State Department suspended all existing foreign aid programs, except for emergency food assistance and military aid to Egypt and Israel. New aid was also paused. On January 28, exemptions were expanded to cover "humanitarian programs that provide life-saving medicine, medical services, food, shelter and subsistence assistance". The exemptions could not include "activities that involve abortions, family planning conferences, administrative costs [that are not reasonably used in life-saving aid], gender or DEI (diversity, equity, and inclusion) ideology programs, transgender surgeries, or other non-life saving assistance." Military assistance under the Department of Defense was not directly affected.

== Background ==
The United States provides over 40% of the world's humanitarian aid, and spends around 1% of its budget on foreign aid, including military aid. Surveys suggest that Americans believe 20% of the federal budget is spent on foreign aid, and that 59% of Americans believe the government spends too much on foreign aid.

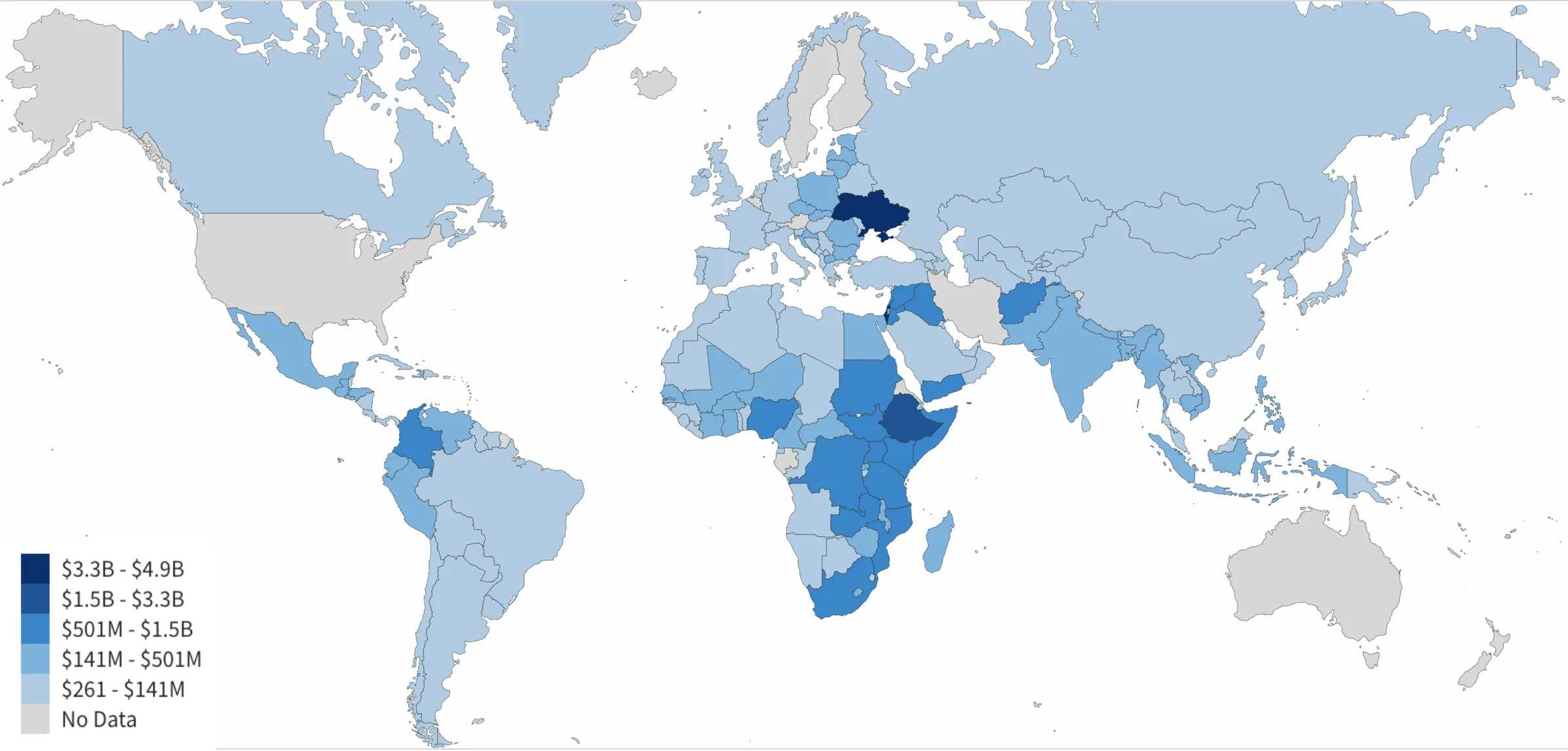
US foreign aid by country 2022

Trump's first term as president was marked by efforts to cut foreign aid spending and bureaucracy. His administration's first budget proposal in March 2017 included a promise to cut aid to developing countries by over a third. Its May 2017 budget aimed to cut Foreign Operations spending — comprising foreign aid and contributions to international organizations — by 31%. It proposed a reduction of 44% in spending on humanitarian aid, 50% on education aid, and 71% on environmental aid. Efforts to cut foreign aid received bipartisan opposition, and the approved budget resulted in smaller decreases in overall bilateral and multilateral aid of 11% and 12%, respectively, while humanitarian and food aid was increased by 15%. Each of the administration's budget proposals included cuts in foreign aid, and Congress allocated more than requested for each.

At the UN General Assembly in 2018, Trump gave a speech in which he said "Moving forward, we are only going to give foreign aid to those who respect us and, frankly, are our friends".

In 2019 the administration launched the Growth in the Americas initiative, an infrastructure development program widely seen as a response to China's Belt and Road Initiative. The administration oversaw the United States' first substantial provision of lethal military aid to Ukraine. It also oversaw an increase in military aid to Israel.

During his 2024 presidential campaign, Trump criticized the scale of US aid to Ukraine, and then-running-mate J.D. Vance criticized sending tax money "to China and to foreign regimes all over the world." Robert F. Kennedy Jr., Trump's nominee to be Secretary of Health and Human Services, has criticized vaccination programs, a major component of health aid. Project 2025, which the Trump campaign distanced itself from during the election, called for USAID to be downsized and "deradicalized".

== Suspension of aid ==
Hours after U.S. president Donald Trump took office January 20, 2025, he signed an executive order titled Reevaluating and Realigning United States Foreign Aid, ordering a 90-day pause on all U.S. foreign development assistance programs in order to conduct a review. The order said that: "United States foreign aid industry and bureaucracy are not aligned with American interests and in many cases antithetical to American values. They serve to destabilize world peace by promoting ideas in foreign countries that are directly inverse to harmonious and stable relations internal to and among countries." The order gave the Secretary of State the ability to waive the suspension for "specific programs".

On January 24, the U.S. State Department suspended all existing foreign aid programs, except for emergency food assistance and military aid to Egypt and Israel. New aid was also paused.

On January 28, exemptions were expanded to cover "humanitarian programs that provide life-saving medicine, medical services, food, shelter and subsistence assistance". The exemptions did not include "activities that involve abortions, family planning conferences, administrative costs [that are not reasonably used in life-saving aid], gender or DEI (diversity, equity, and inclusion) ideology programs, transgender surgeries, or other non-life saving assistance."

On January 29, the State Department issued a statement to justify the freeze by saying that programs "have little to no incentive to share programmatic-level details so long as the dollars continue to flow". The statement claimed that the "pause and review of U.S. foreign aid is already paying dividends to our country and our people", such as by "rooting out waste", "blocking woke programs", and "exposing activities that run contrary to our national interests."

Also on January 29, following a similar claim by White House press secretary Karoline Leavitt the day before, Trump claimed without evidence that his administration "identified and stopped $50 million being sent to Gaza to buy condoms for Hamas", or approximately 1 billion condoms. The claim was refuted by aid workers.

The suspension of State Department aid affects international military financing, education and training; military aid under the Department of Defense was not directly affected.

Court filings from February 25 said that the administration would eliminate over 90% of USAID's foreign aid contracts and $60 billion in overall US foreign assistance. On February 27, US-funded projects around the world were told that their contracts were terminated. According to Reuters, "It is unclear whether the projects can be reinstated."

== Effects ==
The International Rescue Committee told health care clinics in refugee camps in Thailand serving tens of thousands of refugees from Myanmar to be shut by January 31. Refugees were unable to access medicine or oxygen tanks. The IRC also previously helped with the camp's water distribution and garbage disposal systems. Provision of hygiene kits, emergency shelters, and water support for tens of thousands of Gazans was temporarily suspended — water was not covered by the emergency food exemption. A humanitarian official told CNN that their organization had to pause vaccine distribution. A Millennium Challenge Corporation project to modernize Liberia's energy sector and improve transportation was delayed indefinitely.

=== Al-Hawl refugee camp ===
On January 25, hundreds of staff at the Al-Hawl refugee camp in Syria were told to stop working, causing disruptions for water, sanitation, and security. The camp relies heavily on support from NGOs, some of which receive 70% of their funding from the US. The camp holds around 40,000 Islamic State fighters and relatives, mostly women and children. Speaking to Reuters, a senior humanitarian official onsite said: "If there's no unfreezing then everything except the camp guards stop. We're expecting mass rioting, breakout attempts. IS will come for the people they've wanted to come for".

Agencies including the World Health Organization cut back on operations.

The Economist reported that after the State Department order on January 24, Blumont, which coordinates aid work at Al-Hawl and the smaller Roj camp nearby, left the camps and "arranged for other groups to provide 'very much reduced basic services'". On January 27, Blumont received a waiver allowing it to continue "critical operations" at the camps until February 10. On February 6, Blumont said it had not been paid by USAID or the State Department since January 21; it said it had run out of money and was unable to afford working at the camps despite furloughing half of its US-based staff to save funds for field work. On February 14, Reuters reported that Blumont had received a waiver that would last through the 90-day review period. A Blumont official said the organization had had to shut down around 100 other sites of USAID-funded humanitarian and management work for displaced people.

Proximity International, a contractor at the site—which, per The New York Times, "manages a program to train and equip thousands of Syrians to act as a police force, and provide them with vehicles and equipment"—had to stop work and was unable to renew its contract because of the suspension; it was given a one-month waiver on January 31, hours before its contract would have expired.

As Al-Hawl and Roj are "closed camps", residents cannot independently leave; the Syrian Network for Human Rights and Paul Jordan of the European Institute of Peace describe Al-Hawl as a "prison camp". Blumont distributes around 5,000 bags of bread daily, as well as water, kerosene, and cooking gas. Camp residents reported shortages and delays in provisions.

Jihan Hanan, director of Al-Hawl, called the aid suspension "a disgraceful decision".

=== PEPFAR and HIV treatment ===
PEPFAR is a US program that provides HIV treatment and support in 54 countries. According to amfAR, The Foundation for AIDS Research, "20 million people living with HIV globally—including 550,000 children under 15— depend on daily services provided with support of the PEPFAR program". The foundation says: "Globally, on a daily basis, PEPFAR is responsible for supporting:

- More than 222,000 people on treatment in the program collecting ARVs [antiretrovirals] to stay healthy;
- More than 224,000 HIV tests, newly diagnosing 4,374 people with HIV – 10% of whom are pregnant women attending antenatal clinic visits;
- Services for 17,695 orphans and vulnerable children impacted by HIV;
- 7,163 cervical cancer screenings, newly diagnosing 363 women with cervical cancer or pre-cancerous lesions, and treating 324 women with positive cervical cancer results;
- Care and support for 3,618 women experiencing gender-based violence, including 779 women who experienced sexual violence.

Additionally, PEPFAR provides critical technical and infrastructure support for pharmaceutical supply chains, laboratory systems, data systems, and other technical support." According to the Associated Press: "More than 8 million in South Africa live with HIV, and authorities say PEPFAR helps provide life-saving antiretroviral treatment to 5.5 million people every day."

On January 27, PEPFAR staff were unable to log on to their computer systems, affecting clinics that serve 20 million people with HIV. PEPFAR reportedly resumed operations after exemptions were expanded on January 28.

Despite the exemptions created on January 28, many organizations remained unsure if they could resume work. On January 29, Reuters reported that "In Johannesburg, a clinic treating HIV patients and several health centres for transgender people were shuttered on Tuesday [January 28] and remained closed on Wednesday while organisations sought more guidance."

On February 1, the US government gave a waiver with specific guidance on the resumption of HIV treatment. Médecins Sans Frontières said that "Across our broad network, MSF did not see a single organisation able to resume work as a result of this limited guidance on waivers." The US government issued clarified guidance on February 6, which among other things restricted all PEPFAR-funded distribution of pre-exposure prophylaxis and of condoms—used to reduce the spread of HIV—to breastfeeding or pregnant women and to such women and their partners, respectively, for the duration of the 90-day pause.

Elisha Dunn-Georgiou, president and CEO of the Global Health Council, said that waivers to the pause "are not working" and that "PEPFAR programs are not back online". Joia Mukherjee, chief medical officer for Partners in Health, said its HIV work in rural Haiti was disrupted because a partner NGO funded entirely by PEPFAR had to stop operations. Speaking to the BBC, UNAids executive director Winnie Byanyima described the pause as: "immediate. Most of our people are law-abiding: they abide by their contracts, if they are told to stop, they stop. And sometimes, in many countries, in fear of even breaching any rule, when the waiver came they haven't even reopened some of the clinics because they are not sure what they can do and what they can't do."

According to MSF: many clinics in South Africa providing "HIV services, including testing, treatment, and PrEP through PEPFAR-funded organisations" have closed; a major MSF partner organization in Mozambique that provided "comprehensive HIV services" had to stop all activities; most organizations providing HIV services in Zimbabwe have stopped working; and thousands of people with HIV in Kinshasa, the largest city of the Democratic Republic of the Congo, were left without support. MSF said continued suspension of PEPFAR in South Sudan "will have devastating effects on thousands of people and their communities."

A former PEPFAR employee speaking to NPR said the ban on "gender or DEI ideology programs" "makes it difficult to reach girls, who are more than five times more likely to get HIV in some contexts". Speaking to NPR, five sources who until recently worked on HIV issues at USAID and humanitarian nonprofit groups said that HIV testing and drug distribution had stopped. Several USAID- and nonprofit-affiliated sources speaking to NPR on the subject requested anonymity for fear of retribution by the Trump administration.

After an executive order on February 7 stopped US foreign aid to South Africa, a waiver was given to exempt certain PEPFAR activities, though as of February 10, agencies responsible for implementing PEPFAR were still reviewing which activities were exempted.

On February 13, Republican congressman Brian Mast said $500 million of PEPFAR funding had been reauthorized. PEPFAR's 2023 budget was $6.9 billion.

On February 18, UNAids reported that, of a sample of 39 PEPFAR-supported countries: 35 experienced disruptions in "implementation of US-funded HIV programmes"; 14 in "provision of life-saving treatment for people living with HIV"; 10 in "HIV testing of newborn infants exposed to HIV" and "provision of pre-exposure prophylaxis for adolescent girls and young women"; and 9 in "HIV treatment to prevent transmission from mother to child". It also reported that "20,000 health care providers supporting HIV services in Mozambique have received stop-work orders", including 1,038 doctors and clinical officers.

AP reported that, following the termination of aid contracts on February 27, five thousand workers across Ethiopia "focused on HIV and malaria prevention, vaccinations and helping vulnerable women deal with the trauma of war" had their contracts terminated.

=== USAID ===
In the days after the order, over 50 senior officials in the U.S. Agency for International Development were placed on leave for attempting to circumvent the suspension. CBS reported that officials placed on leave included "the assistant administrators and deputy assistant administrators heading up most of [USAID's] bureaus", as well as "USAID attorneys in the Office of the General Counsel, who are responsible for interpreting the executive orders for implementation", and that "hundreds of contractors had their employment furloughed or terminated".

Over the weekend of February 1–2, DOGE officials searched the USAID headquarters, including areas containing classified files and personal information of USAID employees. After security officers tried to turn away DOGE personnel who lacked security clearance, the director and deputy director of USAID security were put on leave. A DOGE spokesperson said on X that no classified documents were accessed without proper clearance. The number of senior USAID staff put on leave rose to near 100. The Trump-appointed USAID chief of staff, Matt Hopson, resigned.

On February 2, Trump said that USAID was "run by a bunch of radical lunatics, and we're getting them out." DOGE head Elon Musk called USAID "a criminal organization" and said it was "Time for it to die". Early on February 3, Musk called USAID a "ball of worms . . . beyond repair", and said "[Trump] agreed we should shut it down." The same day, USAID's website went offline and its staff were denied entry to the agency's headquarters.

On February 10, USAID inspector general Paul Martin said that the dismantling of USAID had left oversight of $8.2 billion in unspent humanitarian aid "largely nonoperational", also noting the impact of the shutdown on "USAID's capacity to disburse and safeguard its humanitarian assistance programming". He was fired the next day, with no official reason given. The Inspector General Act of 1978 requires that Congress be given 30 days of notice before inspectors general are fired; the law was amended in 2022 to further require a "substantive rationale, including detailed and case-specific reasons".

Also on February 10, the Trump administration stripped USAID of the lease of its headquarters, causing its eviction.

On May 21, Trump called the cuts to USAID "devastating" and called for other countries to spend more on aid.

== Legal challenges ==
On February 8, 2025, following a request from two federal employee associations, US District of Columbia Judge Carl J. Nichols paused plans to put 2,200 USAID employees on paid leave hours before it was due to happen. However, on February 23, Judge Nichols reversed his decision to block the administrative leave order.

On February 13, US District of Columbia Judge Amir Ali issued a temporary restraining order on Executive Order 14169, which would have ordered cuts in funding for foreign assistance programs governed by USAID and the U.S. Department of State. The order issued halted the ability of the Government to restrict foreign aid and assistance that had already been in place prior to President Trump assuming office, without fully enjoining the executive order itself. According to Ali, the purpose of suspending portions of the order was to allow for an opportunity to review programs for their efficiency and consistency with federal priorities, as there had been no explanation provided for the blanket suspension of all congressionally appropriated foreign aid. Following this, Ali issued a deadline of February 18 for the government to inform the court of its "status of compliance". However, at an emergency hearing on February 25, Ali said "You're now 12 days in and you can't answer me whether any funds that you've kind of acknowledged were covered by the court's order have been unfrozen?" and told the government that it had until February 27 to demonstrate to the court that it was complying with the temporary restraining order.

== Reactions ==
On January 27, UN Secretary General António Guterres called for additional exemptions to be made to the freeze. Smart News Liberia reported that Liberian president Joseph Boakai began "urgent diplomatic engagements with U.S. officials in an attempt to secure assurances that already approved funds will remain accessible." On January 28, Kenya's Foreign Affairs Principal Secretary Abraham Korir Sing'Oei said in a statement: "We hope President Trump's administration will provide new pathways for cushioning most vulnerable populations." Human Rights Watch said the aid suspension was "putting lives around the world at risk".

== See also ==
- Foreign policy of the second Donald Trump administration
- List of executive orders in the second presidency of Donald Trump
