= Department of Homeland Security Office of Inspector General =

Accountability and oversight body

U.S. Department of Homeland Security Office of Inspector General
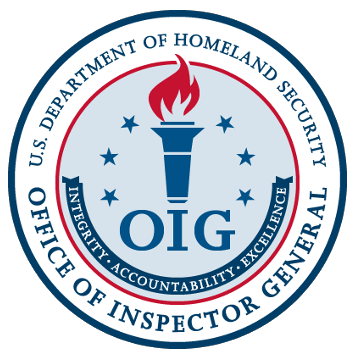

Agency overview
- Formed: 2002
- Type: Inspector General Office
- Employees: 600+
- Annual budget: $214.9m USD (FY 2023)
- Agency executives: Joseph Cuffari, Inspector General; Glenn Sklar, Principal Deputy Inspector General
- Parent department: U.S. Department of Homeland Security
- Website: oig.dhs.gov

The Department of Homeland Security Office of Inspector General was established along with the Department of Homeland Security itself in 2002 by the Homeland Security Act. Its website describes its mission as "supervis[ing] independent audits, investigations, and inspections of the programs and operations of DHS, and recommends ways for DHS to carry out its responsibilities in the most effective, efficient, and economical manner possible."

== Purpose ==
The United States Congress enacted the Inspector General Act of 1978 to ensure integrity and efficiency in government. The Homeland Security Act of 2002, as amended, established an Office of Inspector General (OIG) in the Department of Homeland Security (DHS). The Inspector General is appointed by the President and subject to Senate confirmation.

The Inspector General is responsible for conducting and supervising audits, investigations, and inspections relating to the programs and operations of the DHS. The OIG is to examine, evaluate and, where necessary, critique these operations and activities, recommending ways for the Department to carry out its responsibilities in the most effective, efficient, and economical manner possible.

The office's mission is "to serve as an independent and objective inspection, audit, and investigative body to promote effectiveness, efficiency, and economy in the Department of Homeland Security's programs and operations, and to prevent and detect fraud, abuse, mismanagement, and waste in such programs and operations."

== Organizational Structure ==
The Office of Inspector General is broken up into several OIG offices that perform specific responsibilities and are each headed by a Deputy Inspector General (DIG) who are assisted by several Assistant Inspectors General (AIG).

OIG Offices
OIG Office	Office Executives	Office Scope
Executive Office	Chief of Staff, Kristen Fredricks	Administration
Office of Audits	Deputy Inspector General, Kristen Bernard: Assistant Inspector General, Moe Duddy; Assistant Inspector General, Jack Rouch; Assistant Inspector General, Tinh Nguyen; Assistant Inspector General, Craig Adelman	Audits
Office of Management	Deputy Inspector General, Justin Abold-LaBreche: Assistant Inspector General, Dustin Razsi	Management
Office of Investigations	Deputy Inspector General, James Izzard: Assistant Inspector General, Michael Benedict; Assistant Inspector General, Karen Jordan	Investigations
Office of Integrity	Deputy Inspector General, Gladys Ayala	Ethics, Integrity
Office of Innovation	Deputy Inspector General, Sandra Parsons	Innovation, Technology
Office of Inspections and Evaluations	Deputy Inspector General, Tom Kait: Assistant Inspector General, Erika Lang	Inspections, Evaluations

== List of Inspectors General ==
- Clark Ervin (2003–2005)
- Richard Skinner (2005–2011)
- Charles K. Edwards (acting) (2011–2013)
- John Roth (2014–2017)
- John V. Kelly (acting) (2017–2019)
- Joseph Cuffari (2019–present)

In addition, Jennifer L. Costello has claimed the role of Acting Inspector General of Homeland Security (2019). Inspector General Cuffari has described this as Costello "falsely [holding] herself out as Acting Inspector General" from June 11 to July 25, 2019, in a letter describing that she is "no longer employed by the DHS Office of Inspector General". Costello believes she "has been retaliated against for trying to denounce Cuffari’s mismanagement and wrongdoing."

== Controversy ==
=== Charles K. Edwards ===
Charles K. Edwards, who served as acting DHS inspector general from 2011 through 2013 during the years of Barack Obama’s presidency, resigned in December 2013 following allegations of abuse of power, withholding documents, misspending of funds, nepotism, and making his staff do his homework for his Ph.D. It was also alleged that he routinely shared drinks and dinner with department leaders and gave them inside information about the timing and findings of investigations, according to the report from an oversight panel of the Homeland Security and Government Operations Committee.

Claire McCaskill, chair of the FCO Subcommittee, stated in her report to the Senate: "The Subcommittee found that Mr. Edwards jeopardized the independence of the Office of the Inspector General and that he abused agency resources."

On March 6, 2020 Edwards was indicted by the United States Department of Justice (DOJ). A federal grand jury returned a 16-count indictment against Edwards, alleging he stole both proprietary software and confidential databases from the United States government, part of a scheme to defraud the government.

=== Sono Patel ===
On April 4, 2019, Sono Patel, a former federal technology manager with DHS-OIG, admitted to conspiring with a former acting inspector general of the U.S. Department of Homeland Security, believed to be Charles K. Edwards, to steal a database managing more than 150,000 internal investigations and containing personal data of nearly 250,000 DHS employees. From October 2014 until 2017, Patel admitted to using her position within the Department of Homeland Security’s Office of Inspector General to access and create copies of EDS’s source code, the investigative database used by DHS-OIG, and also containing personal identifying information of DHS and Postal Service employees, so as to provide to Edwards. Their intent was to develop a private, commercial version of EDS to sell back to the U.S. government.
