= Beth Heifetz =

Beth R. Heifetz (born c. 1956) is an American lawyer at Jones Day.

Heifetz was raised in Wisconsin, graduated from the University of Wisconsin, and obtained her Juris Doctor from the New York University School of Law, where she edited the New York University Law Review. She later served as a law clerk for Abner Mikva and Harry Blackmun. Blackmun co-officiated Heifetz and Glenn Fine's September 1993 wedding. The couple has two children. Heifetz is Jewish, and of Polish and Russian descent.

Heifetz is a member of the American Law Institute.
