= Thomas Monheim =

American intelligence official

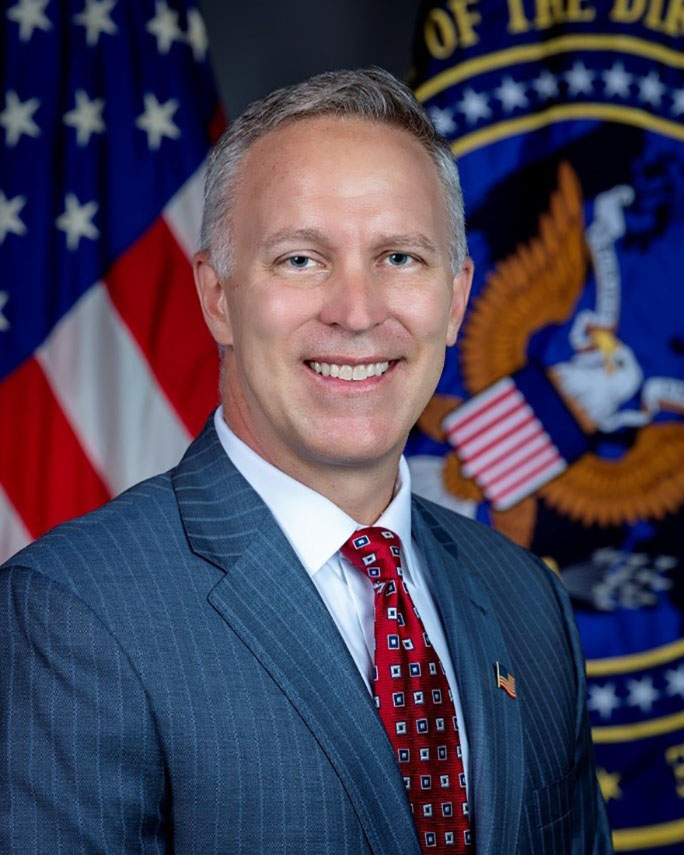

Inspector General of the Intelligence Community
- In office April 3, 2020 – January 3, 2025; Acting: April 3, 2020 - October 4, 2021
- President: Donald Trump; Joe Biden
- Preceded by: Michael Atkinson
- Succeeded by: Christopher Fox

Personal details
- Education: University of Pennsylvania (BA); University of California, Los Angeles (JD)

Thomas Andrew Monheim is an American intelligence officer and lawyer who served as the inspector general of the United States Intelligence Community. He was confirmed by the Senate on September 30, 2021, to be the permanent inspector general. He previously served as general counsel of the National Geospatial-Intelligence Agency.

== Education ==
Monheim is a graduate of the University of Pennsylvania, the UCLA School of Law, and National War College.

== Career ==
=== Military service ===
Monheim has served as a prosecutor, defense counsel, military judge, and deputy general counsel of the White House Military Office. He was mobilized for nine months in support of Operation Enduring Freedom and again for nine months in support of Operation Iraqi Freedom. Monheim retired as a colonel from the Air Force Reserve.

=== U.S. intelligence community acting inspector general ===
Monheim became acting inspector of the intelligence community on April 3, 2020, after President Donald Trump fired his predecessor, Michael Atkinson.

=== Biden administration ===
On April 27, 2021, President Joe Biden nominated Monheim to be the inspector general of the National Intelligence office. Hearings were held before the Senate Intelligence Committee on July 20, 2021. On July 28, 2021, the committee favorably reported his nomination to the Senate floor; the Senate Homeland Security Committee subsequently did as well. Monheim was confirmed by Senate voice vote on September 30, 2021. He resigned in January 2025.
