= Glenn Fine =

American lawyer (born 1956)

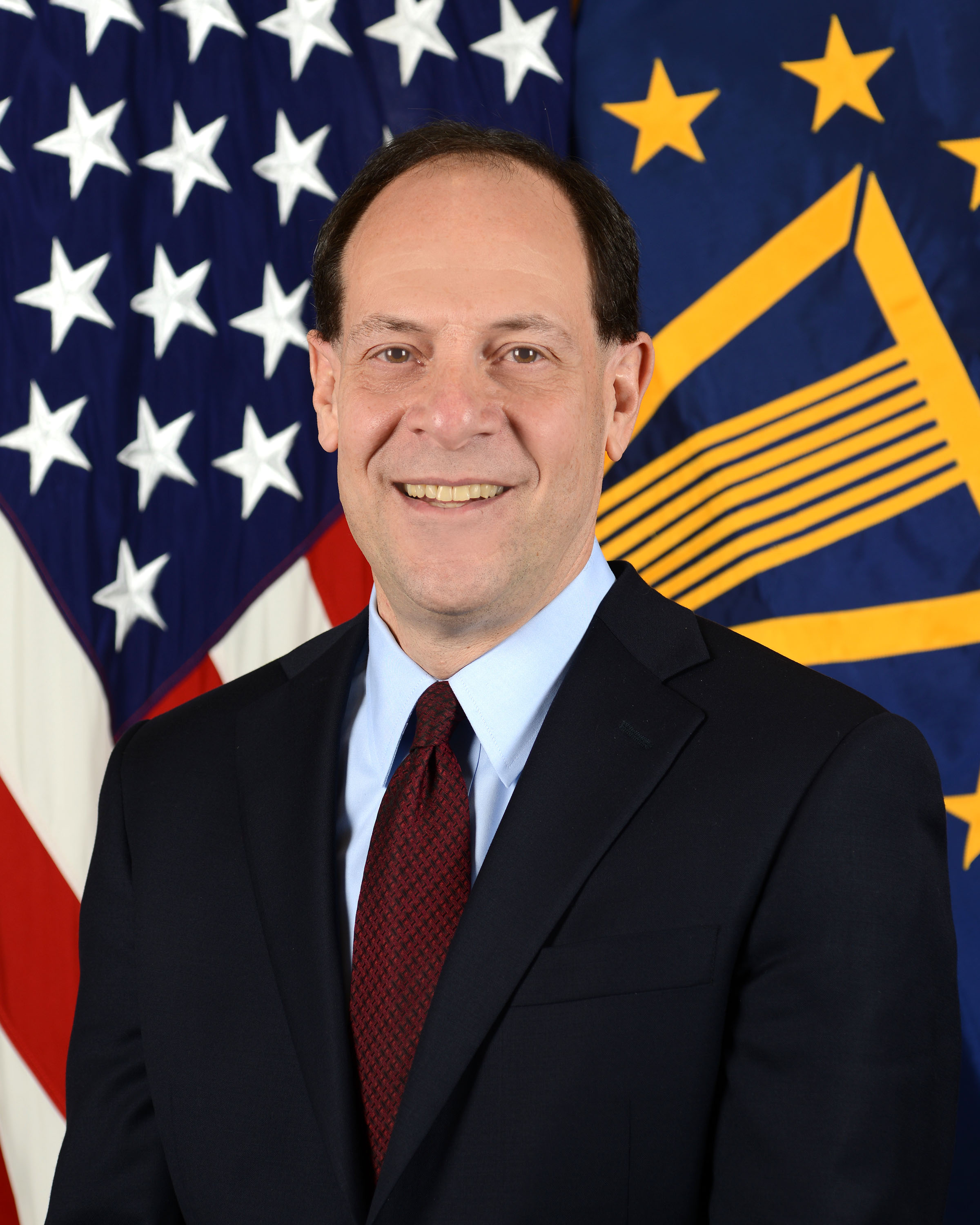

Chair of the Pandemic Response Accountability Committee
- In office March 30, 2020 – April 6, 2020
- President: Donald Trump
- Preceded by: Position established
- Succeeded by: Michael E. Horowitz (Acting)

Acting Inspector General of the Department of Defense
- In office January 14, 2016 – April 6, 2020
- President: Barack Obama; Donald Trump
- Preceded by: Jon Rymer
- Succeeded by: Sean O'Donnell (Acting)

Inspector General of the Department of Justice
- In office August 10, 2000 –: January 28, 2011; Acting: August 10, 2000 – December 15, 2000
- President: Bill Clinton; George W. Bush; Barack Obama
- Preceded by: Michael Bromwich
- Succeeded by: Michael E. Horowitz

Personal details
- Born: Glenn Alan Fine; March 22, 1956 (age 70) Philadelphia, Pennsylvania, U.S.
- Spouse: Beth Heifetz (m. 1996)
- Education: Harvard University (BA, JD); Pembroke College, Oxford (BA)

Glenn Alan Fine (born March 22, 1956) is the former principal deputy Inspector General of the Department of Defense and former Acting IG of the Department of Defense. Fine previously served as the Inspector General of the United States Department of Justice (DOJ) from 2000 until January 2011. He was confirmed by the United States Senate on December 15, 2000. Prior to his appointment as the DOJ Inspector General, Fine served as Special Counsel to the DOJ Inspector General from January 1995 until 1996, when he was made Director of the OIG's Special Investigations and Review Unit.

He joined the Department of Defense Office of Inspector General in June 2015. Immediately prior to joining the OIG office at the Department of Justice, Fine had been in a private law practice in Washington, D.C. Before entering private practice, Fine served as an Assistant United States Attorney for the Washington, D.C. United States Attorney's Office from 1986 to 1989, during which he prosecuted more than 35 criminal jury trials and handled numerous grand jury investigations.

On March 30, 2020, Fine was named chair of the Pandemic Response Accountability Committee, to oversee the $2 trillion stimulus funds signed into law by President Donald Trump in response to the coronavirus outbreak. On April 7, 2020, Fine was removed from his position as acting inspector general by President Trump, which made him ineligible to serve on the pandemic oversight committee. On May 26, 2020, Fine submitted his resignation as principal deputy inspector general effective June 1, 2020.

Fine currently is a non-resident fellow at the Brookings Institution and an adjunct professor of law at Georgetown Law School.

== Early life and education ==
Fine's father was an antitrust lawyer at the Justice Department for 28 years.

Fine attended Cheltenham High School in Wyncote, Pennsylvania, graduating in 1974. Playing high school basketball at Cheltenham, Fine twice earned All-League honors and led his league in scoring in his senior year.

In 1979, he graduated with an A.B. degree in economics from Harvard College, magna cum laude. He played college basketball for the Harvard Crimson men's basketball team. While playing for Harvard, Fine earned All-Ivy League second team honors in the 1977-78 season. He led the Ivy League in assists per game during the 1975-76, 1977-78, and 1978-79 seasons.

Though only 5'9", he was a 10th-round draft pick by the San Antonio Spurs, an NBA basketball team, in 1979. Instead, he accepted a Rhodes Scholarship at the University of Oxford. He continued his basketball playing career as a member of the Oxford University men's basketball team. Fine earned another BA (promoted to an MA, per Oxford tradition) degree at Pembroke College, Oxford. He received his Juris Doctor from Harvard Law School, magna cum laude, in 1985.

== Career ==
=== Inspector General of the Department of Justice ===
Fine was appointed Inspector General of the Department of Justice by President Bill Clinton in 2000. The office is expected to be non-partisan. He served through the George W. Bush administration and part of the Barack Obama administration. Fine has a reputation as an aggressive, independent investigator. Fine served as a member of the Recovery Accountability and Transparency Board. He resigned as the DOJ Inspector General in February 2011. He joined Dechert as a partner in the White Collar & Securities Litigation Practice on September 6, 2011. Shortly after he announced his retirement, The New York Times praised Fine's tenure as the DOJ Inspector General:

The Department of Justice's inspector general, Glenn Fine, stepped down on Friday after a decade of pushing to clean up and depoliticize a hyperpoliticized department. He will be missed. Mr. Fine's best-known efforts came in 2008 when he documented the George W. Bush administration's politically driven firings of four United States attorneys and its politically driven hirings (breaking the civil service law) of scores of civil servants at the Civil Rights Division. Last year, he continued to detail the F.B.I.'s widespread misuse since 2001 of 'exigent letters'... President Obama should appoint a vigilant successor to Mr. Fine, one who will continue to expose the department's shortcomings and their costs.

Other newspapers also praised his tenure as the DOJ IG. The Washington Post wrote, "The job of Inspector General is often thankless one, requiring the ability to make unflinching and crucial assessments that are not always well received by colleagues. The Justice Department employed one of the best during the past decade in the person of Glenn A. Fine, who recently stepped down. Mr. Fine was instrumental in unearthing problems and identifying solutions in the mammoth agency since joining the IG's office in the mid-1990s. He took over the reins in 2000 and led investigations into all facets of the department's operations". A segment on NPR praised Fine as "a model IG."

=== Defense Department IG and Pandemic Response Accountability Committee ===
In June 2015, Fine returned to public service and accepted a position as the principal deputy inspector general of the Department of Defense Office of Inspector General (DOD OIG). On January 10, 2016, Fine became the acting inspector general for the DOD.

On March 30, 2020, Fine was named chair of the Pandemic Response Accountability Committee, to oversee the $2 trillion stimulus funds signed into law by President Donald Trump in response to the coronavirus outbreak. On April 7, 2020, Fine was removed from the position of acting DOD IG by Trump, who claimed without evidence that he was "partisan". That had the effect of also removing him from the accountability committee because only serving IGs can be members. Former Secretary of Defense Jim Mattis released a rare public criticism of the firing, calling Fine "a public servant in the finest tradition of honest, competent governance." On April 8, legislation was introduced in the House to allow Fine to continue as chair of the Pandemic Response Accountability Committee.

On May 26, seven weeks after his dismissal from the acting inspector general position, Fine submitted his resignation as principal deputy inspector general, effective June 1. A Pentagon official said Fine resigned voluntarily and was not pushed out. In a statement Fine gave no reason for resigning but said inspectors general "are a vital component of our system of checks and balances, and I am grateful to have been part of that system. After many years in the DoJ and DoD OIGs, I believe the time has come for me to step down and allow others to perform this vital role."

== Awards and honors ==
- Rhodes scholarship
- National Law Journal's Lawyer of the Year (2008)
- Harvard Law School Award for Distinguished Public Service
- New England Basketball Hall of Fame
- Philadelphia Jewish Sports Hall of Fame

== Personal life ==
In September 1993, Fine married Beth Heifetz, a former law clerk to United States Supreme Court Justice Harry Blackmun. The wedding was jointly officiated at the Watergate Hotel in Washington, D.C., by Justice Blackmun and Rabbi Howard Gorin. Fine and Heifetz have two children.

== Bibliography ==
- "The Constitution's Ombudsman - Harvard Law Today". Harvard Law Today. Archived from the original on March 7, 2021.
- "Watching over Justice". Los Angeles Times. December 3, 2010. ISSN 0458-3035. Archived from the original on November 25, 2016.
- "The National Law Journal Names DOJ Inspector General Glenn Fine as 2008 Lawyer of the Year". Business Wire (Press release). Archived from the original on November 10, 2021.
