= NASA Office of Inspector General =

U.S. space agency oversight entity

Inspector General of NASA
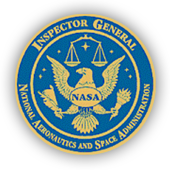
- NASA Office of the Inspector General Seal
- Incumbent; Robert H. Steinau; Acting since December 2024
- NASA
- Style: Mr./Mrs. Inspector General
- Reports to: Attorney General of the United States
- Seat: NASA Headquarters, Washington, D.C.
- Appointer: The president with Senate advice and consent
- Term length: No fixed term
- Website: oig.nasa.gov

The NASA Office of Inspector General (NASA OIG or OIG) is the inspector general office in the National Aeronautics and Space Administration, the space agency of the United States. The OIG's stated mission is to "prevent and detect crime, fraud, waste, abuse, and mismanagement and promote efficiency, effectiveness, and economy throughout NASA."

The current NASA acting inspector general is Robert H. Steinau.

== History and mandate ==
The NASA Office of Inspector General was created in response to Inspector General Act of 1978, which defined Offices of Inspector General (OIGs) to provide independent audit and investigative units at 63 federal agencies, including NASA.

NASA OIG's Computer Crimes Division (CCD) conducted investigations jointly with U.S. and foreign counterparts into NASA computer networks, some of which resulted in arrests, indictments and convictions of hackers located in Venezuela, Italy, Turkey, England, Portugal, Nigeria, and Romania.

NASA OIG special agent badges have the blue NASA logo at their center. Each agent carries credentials which set out the agent's law enforcement authority and contain a one inch by one inch head and shoulders picture of the agent. NASA OIG special agents are armed, have arrest authority and can execute search warrants. They receive their law enforcement training at the U.S. Department of Homeland Security’s Federal Law Enforcement Training Center in Glynco, Georgia. Their hands-on training at Glynco includes hand-to-hand combat, arrest techniques, small arms and shotgun training, high speed pursuit and skid techniques, water safety, interrogation techniques, surveillance training, and search warrant execution techniques. They also have an extensive classroom program at Glynco that includes criminal law, criminal procedure, and related disciplines. The classes contain agents from various agencies, and the top graduate is designated the class honor graduate.

== Staff and offices ==
The OIG employs about 190 people, including auditors, analysts, specialists, investigators, attorneys, and support staff. It has offices in 11 NASA facilities: NASA Headquarters, Dryden Flight Research Center, Ames Research Center, Jet Propulsion Laboratory, Lyndon B. Johnson Space Center, John C. Stennis Space Center, Langley Research Center, Kennedy Space Center, John H. Glenn Research Center, Goddard Space Flight Center, and George C. Marshall Space Flight Center. It is divided into four offices:

- Office of Audits (OA)
- Office of Investigations (OI)

- Computer Crimes Division (CCD)

- Office of Counsel (OC)
- Office of Management (OM)

== Audits ==
The Office of Audits (OA) at the NASA OIG is responsible for conducting audits and reviews of NASA programs, identifying any waste or mismanagement within those programs. Listed below are some notable audits performed by the Office of Audits.

=== Audit of NASA's Management of the Goddard Institute for Space Studies - April 2018 ===
The Goddard Institute for Space Studies (GISS) is responsible for researching the structure of Earth, the Moon, and other planetary bodies. The GISS is also responsible for research on atmospheres, origins and evolutions of planets and moons, Sun- Earth relations, among several other topics. In April 2018, the NASA OA performed an audit regarding GISS and its ability to meet NASA goals and standards, as well as appropriately use funds and coordinate its research with NASA teams.

Findings from this audit conclude that GISS is a major supporter for NASA research and contributes greatly to numerous NASA projects, but has shown that there are some faults in place. 65 percent of GISS scientific research published from 2015-2017 were not approved for release to public, and GISS has practiced “unallowable use of NASA appropriated funds.” NASA OA deemed this to be caused by a lack of sufficient oversight by principal investigators and NASA officials.

The OA suggested that in order to resolve this issue, the NASA Chief Information Officer and Chief of GISS ensure a thorough and proper review of any and all research seeking to be published, so as to prevent the release of sensitive information. In regards to the misuse of funds by GISS, the OA suggested that GISS managers be provided additional training, and that a senior administrator should be hired to oversee the management of the institution’s grants.

=== Audit of NASA's Management and Utilization of the International Space Station (ISS) - July 2018 ===
The ISS has served as an orbiting platform and laboratory for studies about working and living in space and the effects, benefits, and consequences of such. Built as part of an international collaboration, the ISS has been home to biological and technological research, continued international partnership in space, and a platform to lead into studies and missions within deep space. The President's 2019 fiscal year budget request called for an end to direct federal funding of the ISS by 2025, although this was met with bipartisan congressional resistance.

NASA has since proposed transitioning use of the ISS to commercial purposes, alongside continued research operations. This was met with suggestion that NASA should continue use of the ISS until 2028 or further, while also starting to make plans regarding the proper and safe decommission and destruction of the space station upon retirement.

This audit by the NASA OA focuses on NASA’s effectiveness in maximizing the use of the ISS for human spaceflight studies and activities, as well as assesses challenges face by commercial utilization of the ISS. One complication found was that the ending of federal funding by 2025 would pose serious risks to the completion of human health studies and technology gap studies. And since the 2025 timetable is not firm, NASA would have to also make plans for operations through 2028. The OA stated belief that both timetable and the proposal of transition to commercial utilization would pose many risks, specifically with keeping interest of the private sector to take on the enterprise of the ISS.

NASA OA suggested that NASA’s Associate Administrator for NASA’s Human Exploration and Operations Mission Directorate should establish plans for additional 1-year missions to the ISS, ensure contingency plans for all intended research not planned to be completed by 2024, and develop plans and operations for the successful and safe destructive deorbit of the space station.

=== Audit of the NASA SLS Stages Contract - October 2018 ===
In October 2018, the NASA OA performed an investigation into NASA's management of the Space Launch System (SLS) Stages Contract. The SLS is contracted to The Boeing Company, and is the largest development of capabilities of spaceflight since the Space Shuttle Program, started over 40 years ago. This audit was performed to assess the timing of progress by Boeing on the construction of the SLS core stages, infrastructure, and Exploration Upper Stage (EUS).

The OA found Boeing to be behind schedule, having slated an original launch readiness date of late 2017 for an uncrewed flight and 2021 for a crewed flight to 2020 and 2022, respectively. As of this audit, Boeing had expended $5.3 billion of the $6.2 billion allocated for the Boeing stages contract, with Boeing having been expected to reach the contracts full value by 2019 without providing a finished core stage or the EUS. The Office of Audits reviewed Boeing’s meeting of the goals of cost, performance, and scheduling for the development of the SLS core stage. SLS budget was also brought under review to aid in completing the audit and review.

The OA determined that Boeing would exceed costs of $8 billion in development of the SLS core stage and EUS through 2021 with a 2 ½ years slippage in schedule. The summer of 2018 saw an overage of $600 million by Boeing for construction of core stages 1 and 2. The OA estimated that NASA would have to increase the contract value by $800 million to complete the core stage 1 and have it delivered to Kennedy Space Center by December 2019. The OA also estimated that NASA would not meet its launch window of December 2019 – June 2020.

The OA stated that cause of this is due to NASA’s lack of visibility into Boeing’s Stages Contract costs due to all three parts of the SLS project (core stage 1, 2, and EUS) are conjoined into the same contract line item number, creating difficulty in tracking expenditures.

=== Audit of the NASA Crew Commercial Program - November 2019 ===
In November 2019, the NASA OA performed an audit on NASA's management of crew transportation and the Commercial Crew Program (involving The Boeing Company and Space Exploration Technologies, SpaceX), for the purpose of examining NASA's plans, progress, and spending for transportation to and from the International Space Station through U.S. based commercial spaceflight companies.

A main point of concern, and a cause for the audit to be performed, is the cost of the Commercial Crew Program (CCP) and the allocation of funds to the two companies participating, SpaceX and The Boeing Company. Since 2010, NASA has transported astronauts to the ISS via the Russian Soyuz vehicle, and has been in the process of contracting crew transportation. From 2010-2019, this effort has obligated $5.5 billion out of an allotted $8.5 billion total. The OIG performed an investigation on the spending, finding that there was a significant difference in the funding being paid to the two companies. NASA had paid the Boeing Company an extra $287.2 million above Boeing's fixed prices, a compensation that the NASA OIG found to be unnecessary due to risks within Boeing's schedule for flights 2 and 3 of the Boeing CTS-100 Starliner craft. Regarding this and other cost parameters outlining misuse of funds, the NASA OIG provided suggestions to increase efficiency and effectiveness of the CCP.

The contracts with Boeing and SpaceX were valued at $4.3 billion and $2.5 billion, respectively, each being contracted for six round-trip flights. NASA OIG compared these costs and differences in contract awards, as well as analyzing the cost per seat of the Soyuz, Boeing Starliner, and SpaceX Crew Dragon, finding that the costs for both Boeing and SpaceX are more economic than the continued use of the Soyuz, with SpaceX providing the least costly option at $55 million.
