= Michael Atkinson (inspector general) =

American intelligence official (born 1964)

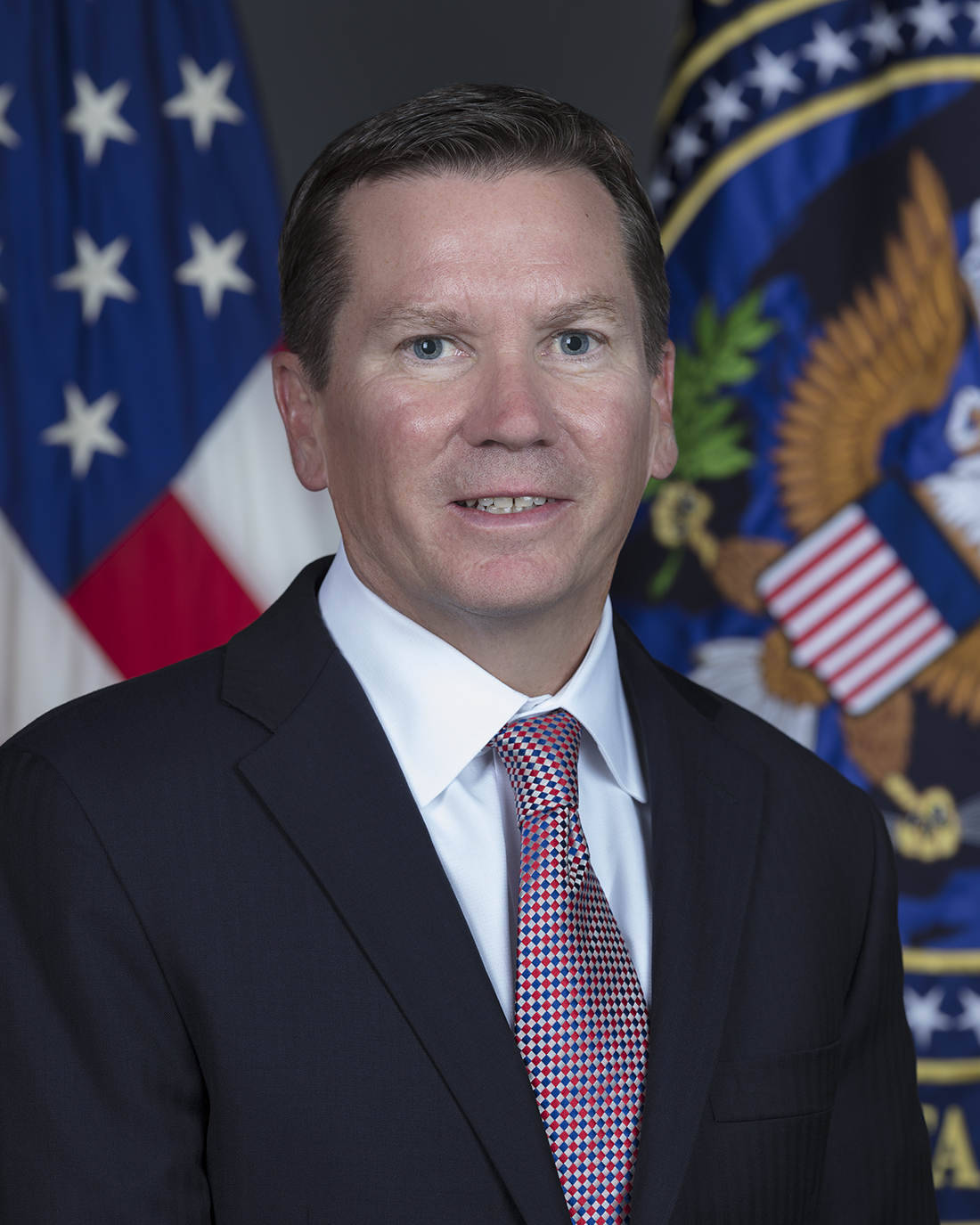

Inspector General of the Intelligence Community
- In office May 17, 2018 – May 3, 2020; On leave: April 3, 2020 – May 3, 2020
- President: Donald Trump
- Preceded by: Charles McCullough
- Succeeded by: Thomas Monheim

Personal details
- Born: Michael Kevin Atkinson; May 16, 1964 (age 62) Oswego, New York, U.S.
- Spouse: Kathryn Cameron
- Education: Syracuse University (BA); Cornell University (JD)

Michael Kevin Atkinson (born May 16, 1964) is an American attorney. He worked for the United States Department of Justice for approximately 15 years, before becoming the second Inspector General of the Intelligence Community. He assumed office on May 17, 2018.

Atkinson is known for alerting Congress in September 2019 to a whistleblower complaint about President Donald Trump pressuring Ukraine to investigate political rival for the presidency Democrat Joe Biden and his son Hunter Biden; the scandal eventually led to Trump's impeachment and acquittal.

On April 3, 2020, President Trump dismissed Atkinson, saying he "no longer" had confidence in the Inspector General (Atkinson's actual deposition was dated to 30 days from April 3; he was placed on administrative leave and "effectively [fired]" on April 3). A bipartisan group of senators demanded a more thorough explanation from Trump regarding the ousting.

== Early life ==
Atkinson was born in Oswego, New York, and was raised in nearby Pulaski. He graduated from Pulaski Academy and Central School in 1982 and earned his Bachelor of Arts from Syracuse University in 1986 and his Juris Doctor from Cornell Law School in 1991.

== Career ==
=== Legal career in private practice and the Justice Department ===
After graduating from law school, Atkinson was admitted to the District of Columbia Bar, and joined the law firm of Winston & Strawn, where he worked for 11 years, first as an associate and then as a partner.

After the September 11 attacks, Atkinson decided to enter public service, and worked for the U.S. Department of Justice for 15 years. He was a trial attorney in the Justice Department's Criminal Division, Fraud Section, from 2002 through 2006 and Assistant U.S. Attorney in the U.S. Attorney's Office for the District of Columbia from 2006 through 2016. Atkinson then moved to the Justice Department's National Security Division where he advised the Assistant Attorney General.

Major cases on which Atkinson worked while in the Justice Department included the prosecution of former U.S. Representative William J. Jefferson on corruption charges (of which Jefferson was convicted) and the campaign finance investigation into D.C. Mayor Vincent C. Gray (which was closed in 2015 without charges being brought). Atkinson received the Attorney General's Award for Distinguished Service from Eric Holder for his work on the Jefferson case.

=== Inspector General of the Intelligence Community ===
Atkinson became Inspector General of the Intelligence Community (ICIG) in May 2018. He was nominated to the position, despite being an Obama holdover and a former aide of Mary B. McCord, in November 2017 by President Donald Trump and was confirmed by the United States Senate by voice vote on May 14, 2018.

At his confirmation hearings, Atkinson indicated that he would bring order to the troubled ICIG's office, which had a reputation for dysfunction, and pledged to revive a whistleblower program that had become virtually defunct under the previous Acting Inspector General, saying that he would "encourage, operate, and enforce a program for authorized disclosures by whistleblowers within the intelligence community that validates moral courage without compromising national security and without retaliation." Restoring the whistleblower program was a major priority among members of the Senate Intelligence Committee.

In August 2019, Atkinson, as inspector general, received a formal complaint from a whistleblower within the Executive Office of the President of the United States who stated that they had learned, in the course of normal duties, that Trump had abused his power "to solicit interference from a foreign country in the 2020 U.S. election", specifically by pressuring a foreign government (Ukraine) to investigate former Vice President Joe Biden and his son Hunter Biden. The whistleblower, a Central Intelligence Agency (CIA) officer detailed to the White House National Security Council, submitted the report to Atkinson under the provisions of the Intelligence Community Whistleblower Protection Act (ICWPA).

Atkinson looked into the complaint, and interviewed several government officials whom the whistleblower identified as having information to substantiate his claims. On August 26, having found the complaint to be both "credible" and "of urgent concern" (as defined by the ICWPA), Atkinson transmitted the complaint to Joseph Maguire, the acting Director of National Intelligence (DNI). Under ICWPA, the DNI "shall" forward a complaint deemed credible and of urgent concern, within seven days of receipt, to the Senate and House Intelligence Committees. The Trump administration, however, withheld the complaint from Congress; Steven Engel of the Justice Department's Office of Legal Counsel issued a determination saying that the acting DNI did not need to give the complaint to Congress because, in the opinion of the OLC, the complaint was not related to "an intelligence activity" under the acting DNI's authority.

Clashing with Maguire, Atkinson himself notified Congress about the existence of the whistleblower report. In a letter to the House Intelligence Committee, Atkinson said that he and Maguire were "at an impasse" and wrote that "As it now stands, my unresolved differences with the Acting DNI are affecting the execution of two of my most important duties and responsibilities" (to whistleblowers and to Congress). The Trump administration eventually released the complaint following demands for its release from the U.S. Senate and U.S. House of Representatives. The complaint prompted the launch of a House impeachment inquiry against Trump. The whistleblower complaint brought public attention to Atkinson, who previously was a little-known official.

In mid-November, news reports revealed that the president was angry with Atkinson and wanted to fire him. He was placed on administrative leave by President Trump on April 3, 2020, who announced that he would dismiss Atkinson in 30 days (May 3, 2020).

== 2026 ==
In April 2026, Tulsi Gabbard, then-director of national intelligence (DNI), announced that a criminal referral had been sent to the United States Department of Justice (DOJ) alleging that Atkinson, an Obama holdover and a former aide of Mary B. McCord, "did not follow standard IG procedures ... only conducting interviews with four individuals: the Whistleblower, the Whistleblower's friend who was a co-author of the January 2017 Russia Hoax Intelligence Community Assessment (ICA) and close colleague of disgraced former FBI Agent Peter Strzok, and two character references who had zero firsthand knowledge of the July 2019 phone call."

On April 13, 2026, the United States House Permanent Select Committee on Intelligence released two transcripts of hearings in 2019 in which Atkinson had been questioned. According to MSN, Atkinson knew the complainant was a registered Democrat who had gone to Democratic lawmakers, including Adam Schiff, before filing a complaint yet [Atkinson] still decided the complaint was "a matter of urgent concern that appeared credible."

== See also ==
- Presidency of Donald Trump

== Sources ==
- Senate Select Committee on Intelligence Questionnaire (Page 92)
