= Office of Inspector General of the United States Agency for International Development =

Federal oversight office that monitors USAID

- Abbreviation: USAID OIG
- Formation: December 16, 1980
- Inspector General: Van Nguyen (acting)
- Parent organization: United States Agency for International Development
- Website: oig.usaid.gov

The Office of Inspector General of the United States Agency for International Development (USAID-OIG) is the internal oversight office for the United States Agency for International Development. It is responsible for detecting and preventing fraud, waste, abuse, and violations of law and to promote economy, efficiency and effectiveness in the operations of USAID, the Millennium Challenge Corporation, the United States African Development Foundation, and the Inter-American Foundation.

The OIG fulfills these responsibilities by conducting audits, investigations, and other reviews. OIG accomplishments are reported in semiannual reports to the Congress. OIG’s published plans and reports, testimony, and press releases are available on its Web site. The underlying law laying out the OIG's authority, responsibility, and reporting requirements is the Inspector General Act of 1978, as amended.

OIG is organized into three operational units: Audit, Investigations, and Management. It has five overseas offices located in Bangkok, Thailand; Pretoria, South Africa; San Salvador, El Salvador; Kyiv, Ukraine; and Tel Aviv, Israel.

== History of Inspectors General ==
Inspector General	Appointment Date
Van Nguyen (Acting)	March 13, 2025
Marc Meyer (Acting)	February 11, 2025
Paul K. Martin	January 2, 2024
Nicole Angarella (Acting Deputy IG)	June 1, 2022
Thomas J. Ullom, (Acting)	January 1, 2021
Ann Calvaresi Barr	November 30, 2015
Catherine Trujillo (Acting Deputy IG)	January 1, 2015
Michael Carroll (Acting)	October 16, 2011
Donald A. Gambatesa	January 17, 2006
Paula Hayes (Acting Deputy IG)	October 4, 2005
Bruce Crandlemire (Acting)	March 4, 2005
James R. Ebbitt (Acting)	September 4, 2004
Everett L. Mosley	December 15, 2000
Everett L. Mosley (Acting)	August 2, 1999
Jeffrey Rush	August 26, 1994
Herbert L. Beckington	September 1, 1977
