= Joseph Cuffari =

American government official (born 1959)

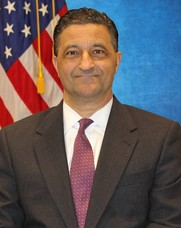

Inspector General of the Department of Homeland Security
- Incumbent
- Assumed office July 25, 2019
- President: Donald Trump; Joe Biden; Donald Trump
- Preceded by: John Roth

Personal details
- Born: Joseph Vincent Cuffari; 1959 (age 66–67) Philadelphia, Pennsylvania, U.S.
- Education: University of Arizona (BS); Webster University (MA); California Coast University (PhD)

Joseph Vincent Cuffari (born 1959) is an American government administrator who has been the Inspector General of the U.S. Department of Homeland Security since 2019.

He previously held positions in the Air Force Office of Special Investigations and Department of Justice Office of the Inspector General. Cuffari was also a policy advisor to Arizona Governors Jan Brewer and Doug Ducey.

An appointee of President Donald Trump, Cuffari was found in October 2024 by an independent panel of watchdogs to have committed misconduct during his tenure as inspector general of the DHS, including misleading the Senate during his nomination process. When Trump became president again in January 2025, he fired a large number of inspectors general, but kept Cuffari in office.

== Education and early career ==
Cuffari was born in 1959 in Philadelphia to an Italian American family. He enlisted in the United States Air Force in 1977, immediately after graduating from high school. He served over 40 years in the Air Force including service on active duty, in the Air Force Reserve, and in the Arizona Air National Guard. In 1984, he received a B.S. degree in business administration and management information systems from the University of Arizona. While on active duty, he rose to hold leadership positions in the Air Force Office of Special Investigations.

Between 1993 and 2013, he worked for the Department of Justice, culminating in an assignment as the Assistant Special Agent in Charge for the Office of the Inspector General in Tucson, Arizona. A 2013 investigation into Cuffari’s conduct concluded that he misled investigators and violated the inspector general manual when testifying in a civil lawsuit without approval of his superiors. The report raised doubts about Cuffari recommending law firms run by his friends to a complainant in a case he had worked on. The report also stated that while analyzing his government e-mail account the investigation found other items that could warrant further investigation. However, Cuffari left the position a month after the report was issued to work as policy advisor for Military and Veterans Affairs for Governors Jan Brewer and Doug Ducey of Arizona.

He received a M.A. in management from Webster University in 1995, and a Ph.D. in management from California Coast University in 2002, an online, for-profit university which at that time, prior to its accreditation, was characterized as a "diploma mill" by the Government Accountability Office. In 2019, Cuffari's government bio incorrectly claimed his Ph.D. was in philosophy. At the time he attended California Coast University, it was unaccredited. In 2005, it received accreditation from the Distance Education Accrediting Commission. During this time he also worked for the Department of Defense Office of the Inspector General.

== DHS Inspector General ==
Cuffari was nominated by Donald Trump and was confirmed by a voice vote in the U.S. Senate as the Department of Homeland Security (DHS) Inspector General (IG) on July 25, 2019. Upon being confirmed he pledged to continue unannounced inspections of immigration detention facilities.

Cuffari rejected his staff's recommendation to investigate what role the United States Secret Service played in the forcible clearing of protesters from Lafayette Square during the Donald Trump photo op at St. John's Church in June 2020.

Cuffari also sought to limit the scope of the investigation into the spread of COVID-19 within the Secret Service, which had been attributed to the Trump Re-Election Campaign's not following COVID guidelines. It was later reported that 881 employees of the Secret Service had been infected with COVID, more than 11% of the agency.

Following Brian Murphy's September 2020 whistleblower complaint about Chad Wolf, Ken Cuccinelli, and Kirstjen Nielsen politicizing Department of Homeland Security assets to support the views of both Stephen Miller and Donald Trump, Cuffari began his inspector general (IG) investigation into alleged misconduct at Department of Homeland Security (DHS) after the November 2020 elections. The DHS Office of Intelligence & Analysis released no "intelligence products specific for the January 6", 2021 attack on the Capitol. On April 27, 2021, Brian Volsky, the former head of the DHS inspector general's whistleblower protection unit, filed a memo with CIGIE accusing Cuffari and James Read, who was the DHS IG counsel to Cuffari and Kristen Fredricks (who was Cuffari's DHS IG chief of staff) of mishandling Brian Murphy's complaints.

In December 2021, Cuffari's office learned that Secret Service text messages from the time of the attack on the U.S. Capitol on January 6, 2021 had been deleted. Staff members of his office planned to contact the respective offices, collect the phones and use data recovery specialists to try to recover the messages. However, Cuffari decided not to review any of the phones. He informed Congress in July 2022 in a letter that the text messages were lost. Cuffari learned in February 2022 that text messages of former acting DHS Secretary Chad Wolf and acting DHS Deputy Ken Cuccinelli were lost in a reset after they left the DHS. He did not investigate the deletion of these records. In August 2022, the chairs of the Oversight and Reform Committee and Committee on Homeland Security accused Cuffari of hampering the Congressional investigation into the January 6 attack on the US Capitol and made public a letter he wrote refusing to share documents related to the investigation or to allow members of his office to be interviewed.

In October 2022, NPR reported that the majority of lawyers in the Office of Counsel had left. The departures often stemmed from the lawyers' unease with how Joseph Cuffari managed the watchdog role. Earlier in 2022, the Senate Judiciary Committee's top leaders raised concerns that Cuffari downplayed widespread reports of sexual harassment and misconduct at DHS. In May 2022, Cuffari issued a scathing response, shifting the blame onto lower-level employees in his agency.

In October 2024, the Integrity Committee of the Council of the Inspectors General on Integrity and Efficiency released a redacted "Report of Findings" on the IG's office at DHS.
