= Inspector General of the Intelligence Community =

U.S. government position

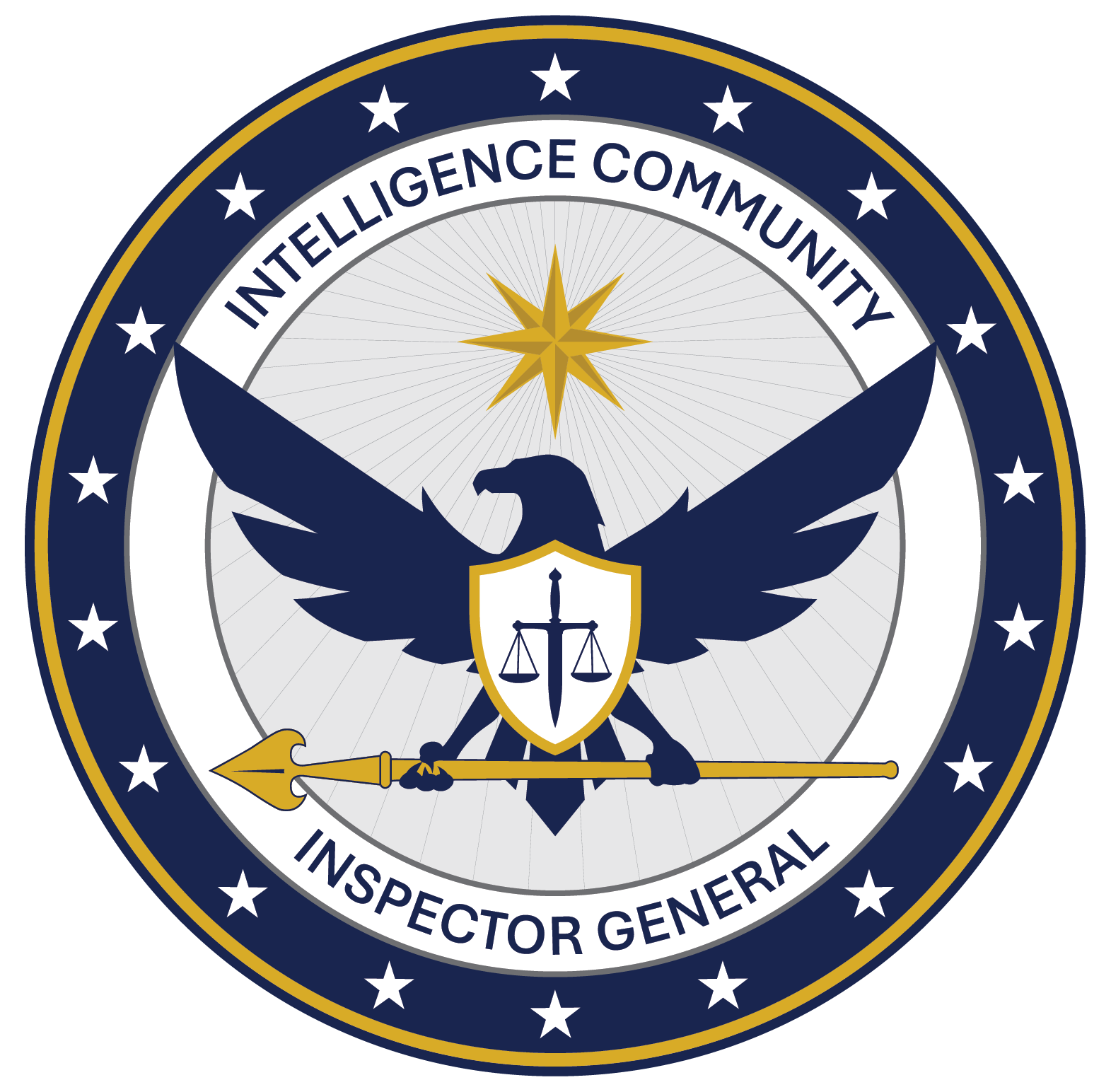
- Seal of the ICIG

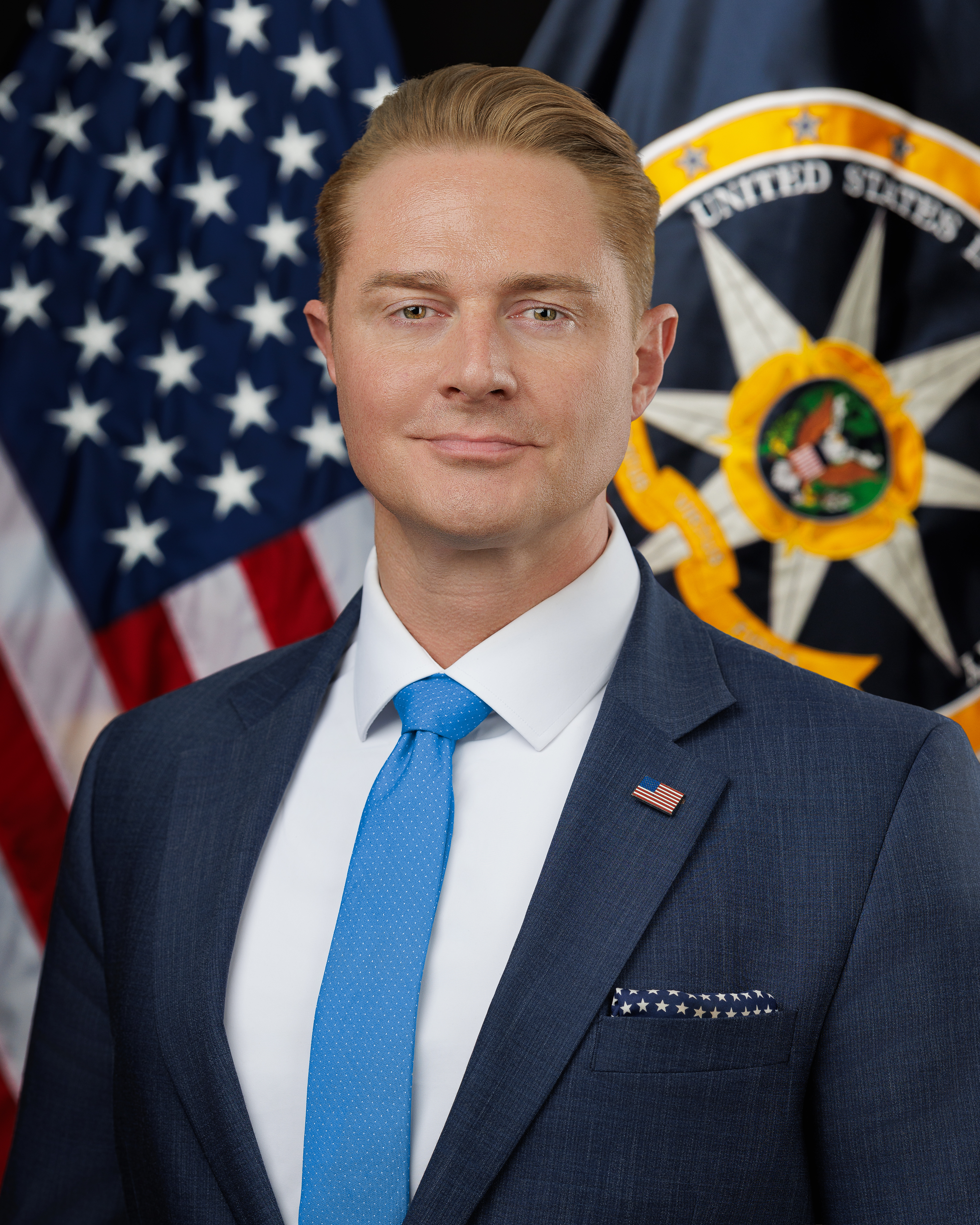
- Incumbent; Christopher Fox since October 16, 2025
- United States Intelligence Community
- Reports to: Director of National Intelligence
- Appointer: The president; with Senate advice and consent
- Term length: No fixed term
- Constituting instrument: 50 U.S.C. § 3033
- Formation: October 7, 2010
- First holder: Charles McCullough
- Website: Official website

The Intelligence Community Inspector General (IC IG) is a presidentially appointed, Senate-confirmed (PAS) official responsible for independent oversight of the United States Intelligence Community. The IC IG leads the Intelligence Community Office of the Inspector General (IC OIG) and serves as the statutory chair of the Intelligence Community Inspectors General Forum, which consists of all Inspectors General with oversight responsibility for an element of the Intelligence Community.

The 2010 Intelligence Authorization Act formally established the Intelligence Community Office of the Inspector General within the Office of the Director of National Intelligence.

In accordance with 50 U.S.C. § 3033, the IC IG conducts independent and objective audits, investigations, inspections, and reviews to promote economy, efficiency, effectiveness, integration, and accountability across the Intelligence Community.

== Controversies ==
In January 2018, Dan Meyer, Executive Director of IC Whistleblowing and Source Protection, publicly defended himself after being placed on administrative leave amid allegations by Acting ICIG Wayne Stone, while an unusual disciplinary panel of inspectors general from the Departments of Treasury and Energy, the National Security Agency, the National Geospatial-Intelligence Agency, and the National Reconnaissance Office reviewed his case following his own whistleblowing disclosures about failures to implement Presidential Policy Directive 19.

Regarding unidentified flying objects (UFOs or UAP), in September–October 2023 Dylan Borland was interviewed by ICIG Thomas Monheim and director Avril Haines and when Borland said he wanted to "look Congress in the eyes, tell them the truth under oath" that Monheim said "as far as we’re concerned, you already did that and you’re not doing it again". ICIG personnel informed Borland that everything he had said during the interview—including unclassified information—would be subject to executive review, effectively restricting him from publicly discussing the matter. Dylan Borland testified to Congress's Task Force on the Declassification of Federal Secrets about UFOs/UAP in September 2025.

== History ==
The 2010 Intelligence Authorization Act formally established the Office of the Inspector General of the United States Intelligence Community within the Office of the Director of National Intelligence.

On May 10, 2021, President Joe Biden nominated Thomas Monheim, the Acting Inspector General, to serve as the inspector general. On September 30, 2021, Monheim was confirmed by the US Senate.

== List of inspectors general ==
No.	Image	Name	Start	End	Duration	President(s)
1		Charles McCullough	November 2011	March 2017	~5 years	Barack Obama
2		Michael Atkinson	May 17, 2018	April 3, 2020	1 year, 322 days	Donald Trump
3		Thomas Monheim	April 3, 2020	January 3, 2025	4 years, 275 days	Joe Biden
-		Tamara Johnson (acting)	January 3, 2025	October 16, 2025	286 days	Joe Biden
4		Christopher Fox	October 16, 2025	Present	1 year, 37 days	Donald Trump
