= Council of the Inspectors General on Integrity and Efficiency =

U.S. government inspectors general group

- Abbreviation: CIGIE
- Formation: 2008; 18 years ago
- Legal status: Independent entity within the United States executive branch
- Headquarters: Washington, D.C., U.S.
- Coordinates: 38.900467°N 77.040536°W
- Members: All Inspectors General whose offices are established under section 2 or section 8G of the Inspector General Act of 1978 (5 U.S.C. App.), those that are presidentially-appointed with Senate confirmation and those that are appointed by agency heads (designated federal entities).
- Executive Chair: Eric M. Ueland
- Chair: Cheryl L. Mason
- Vice Chair: Jeremy M. Kirkland
- Executive Director: Andrew M. Cannarsa
- Publication: The Journal of Public Integrity
- Website: ignet.gov oversight.gov

The Council of the Inspectors General on Integrity and Efficiency (CIGIE) is an independent entity within the executive branch of the federal government of the United States established in October 2008 by the Inspector General Reform Act of 2008.

The council addresses integrity, economy, and effectiveness issues that transcend individual government agencies; and increase the professionalism and effectiveness of personnel by developing policies, technical standards, and approaches to aid in the establishment of a well-trained and highly skilled workforce in the Office of Inspector General.

== Composition ==
The CIGIE is composed of all federal U.S. Inspectors General whose offices are established under section 2 or section 8G of the Inspector General Act of 1978 (5 U.S.C. App.), those that are presidentially-appointed with Senate confirmation and those that are appointed by agency heads (designated federal entities). This includes the inspector general of federal agencies such as the U.S. Department of Defense, the U.S. Department of Labor, and the U.S. Agency for International Development. The 2008 Inspector General Reform Act combined the former PCIE and ECIE into CIGIE. As of 2026, the CIGIE consisted of 70 Federal Offices of Inspector General.

In March 2020, the Pandemic Response Accountability Committee (PRAC) was created within the CIGIE to oversee the $2.2 trillion in government funds designated for response to the COVID-19 pandemic in the United States.

In January 2025, a bipartisan group of six senators launched the Inspector General Caucus to reinforce the work of the inspectors general.

== Council Executive ==
The Deputy Director for Management of the Office of Management and Budget (OMB) is the executive chair of the council. The chair of the council is elected by the council members to serve a two-year term. The chair appoints a vice chair from other than the category from which the chair was elected. Other statutory members of the CIGIE include: the inspectors general of the Office of the Director of National Intelligence and the Central Intelligence Agency, the controller of the Office of Federal Financial Management, a senior-level official of the Federal Bureau of Investigation (FBI) designated by the Director of the FBI, Director of the United States Office of Government Ethics (OGE)Special Counsel of the Office of Special Counsel (OSC), the deputy director of the Office of Personnel Management (OPM), the inspectors general of the Library of Congress, United States Capitol Police, Government Printing Office (GPO), Government Accountability Office (GAO), and the Architect of the Capitol.

Prior to the establishment of the CIGIE, the federal inspectors general operated under the auspices of two councils, The President's Council on Integrity and Efficiency (PCIE) and the Executive Council on Integrity and Efficiency (ECIE) from the time they were established by Executive Order 12805, May 11, 1992, until the signing of P.L. 110–409.

== Methodology ==
To accomplish its mission, the CIGIE:

1. continually identifies, reviews, and discusses areas of weakness and vulnerability in Federal programs and operations with respect to fraud, waste, and abuse;
2. develops plans for coordinated, Government wide activities that address these problems and promote economy and efficiency in Federal programs and operations, including interagency and inter-entity audit, investigation, inspection, and evaluation programs and projects to deal efficiently and effectively with those problems concerning fraud and waste that exceed the capability or jurisdiction of an individual agency or entity;
3. develops policies that will aid in the maintenance of a corps of well-trained and highly skilled Office of Inspector General personnel;
4. maintains an Internet website and other electronic systems for the benefit of all Inspectors General; maintain 1 or more academies] as the council considers desirable for the professional training of auditors, investigators, inspectors, evaluators, and other personnel of the various offices of inspector general;
5. submits recommendations of individuals to the appropriate appointing authority for any appointment to an office of Inspector General described under subsection (b)(1)(A) or (B); and
6. makes such reports to the United States Congress as the chairperson determines are necessary or appropriate; and perform other duties within the authority and jurisdiction of the council, as appropriate.
