= Inspector General Act of 1978 =

United States oversight law

- Long title: An Act to reorganize the executive branch of the Government and increase its economy and efficiency by establishing Offices of Inspector General within the Departments of Agriculture, Commerce, Housing and Urban Development, the Interior, Labor, and Transportation, and within the Community Services Administration, the Environmental Protection Agency, the General Services Administration, the National Aeronautics and Space Administration, the Small Business Administration, and the Veterans' Administration, and for other purposes.
- Enacted by: the 95th United States Congress
- Effective: October 1, 1978

Citations
- Public law: 95−452
- Statutes at Large: 92 Stat. 1101 aka 92 Stat. 1101

Codification
- Titles amended: 5 U.S.C.: Government Organization and Employees
- U.S.C. sections created: 5 U.S.C. ch. 4 § 401 et seq.

Legislative history
- Signed into law by President Jimmy Carter on October 12, 1978

The Inspector General Act of 1978 is a United States federal law (92 Stat. 1101) defining a standard set of Inspector General offices across several specified departments of the U.S. federal government.

The Act specifically creates Inspector General positions and offices in more than a dozen specific departments and agencies. The Act gave these inspectors general the authority to review the internal documents of their departments or offices. They were given responsibility to investigate fraud, to give policy advice (5 U.S.C. § 404; IG Act, sec. 4), to handle certain complaints by employees, and to report to the heads of their agencies and to Congress on their activities every six months (5 U.S.C. § 405; IG Act, sec. 5).

Many existing offices with names like Office of Audit, Office of Investigations, or similar were transferred, renamed, folded into the new IG offices.

The core of the law is in 5 U.S.C. § 403 (IG Act, sec. 3(a)): "There shall be at the head of each Office an Inspector General who shall be appointed by the President, without regard to political affiliation and solely on the basis of integrity and demonstrated ability in accounting, auditing, financial analysis, law, management analysis, public administration, or investigations. Each Inspector General shall report to and be under the general supervision of the head of the establishment involved or, to the extent such authority is delegated, the officer next in rank below such head, but shall not report to, or be subject to supervision by, any other officer of such establishment. Neither the head of the establishment nor the officer next in rank below such head shall prevent or prohibit the Inspector General from initiating, carrying out, or completing any audit or investigation, or from issuing any subpoena during the course of any audit or investigation."

The Act and the Inspector General role were amended thirty years later by the Inspector General Reform Act of 2008, which created the umbrella IG agency, Council of the Inspectors General on Integrity and Efficiency (CIGIE).

In May 2020, after a series of IG firings for questionable causes, several House Democrats introduced a bill, H.R.6984, to amend the original act to protect against political retaliation and require just cause for IG dismissal.

In 2022, Congress moved the language of the Inspector General Act of 1978 from the Appendix of Title 5 of the U.S. Code to Title 5 itself as part of a positive law codification project. The Securing Inspector General Independence Act of 2022 amended Inspector General Act of 1978. Congress must be informed by the president 30 days in advance notice before removing any inspector general and given "the substantive rationale, including detailed and case-specific reasons" for doing so. The Securing Inspector General Independence Act of 2022 was enacted to "to expand protections for Inspectors General being removed, transferred or placed on non-duty status. It also limited on who may fill the role of Acting Inspector General in the event of a vacancy, required Acting IGs to report to Congress regarding ongoing OIG investigations, and required the President provide Congress with an explanation for failure to nominate an IG within a specified period of time. The act streamlined existing requirements for OIG Semiannual Reports to Congress, and required IGs to report Congress when information or assistance is unreasonably refused or not provided by the Department. Additionally, the act required that non-governmental organizations and business entities be notified and provided an opportunity to comment on non-investigative OIG reports in which they are specifically identified."

== See also ==
- 2025 dismissals of U.S. inspectors general
