= DoD Inspector General Medal for Meritorious Civilian Service =

Department of Defense Inspector General Medal for Meritorious Civilian Service
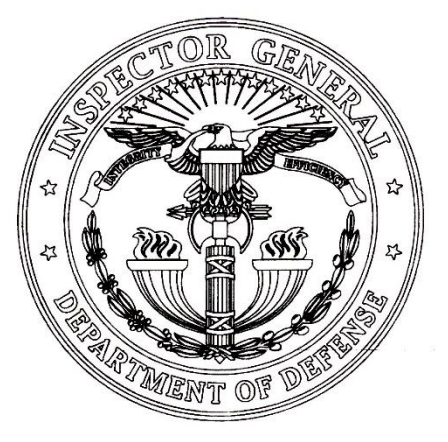
- Sponsored by: Department of Defense
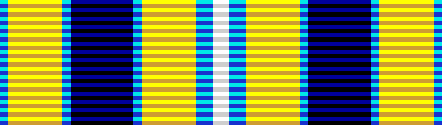
- Ribbon Bar

Precedence
- Next (higher): DoD Inspector General Medal for Superior Civilian Service

The Department of Defense Inspector General Medal for Meritorious Civilian Service is the third highest civilian award given by the United States Department of Defense (DoD) Office of the Inspector General (OIG). This award recognizes employee contributions or service that are of significant value but not significant enough to get consideration for the DoD Inspector General Medal for Superior Civilian Service.

== Criteria ==
The guidelines for the DoD Inspector General Medal for Distinguished Civilian Service are also the guidelines for this award; however, the employee contributions or service may apply to a smaller area of operation or be a project of lesser importance or scope. The nominee need not have received other OIG honorary awards.

== Eligibility ==
Office of the Inspector General (DoD) employees who meet all of the following criteria are eligible for consideration:

1. Must be a permanent civilian employee with at least one year of OIG service. (The length of service requirement may be waived if the award is for an act of heroism.)
2. Must have no pending or final performance or adverse actions against him/her during at least three years before the nomination date for this award.
3. Must be a United States Citizen.

== Description ==
The medal is circular red brass with the words INSPECTOR GENERAL inscribed above the seal of the Department of Defense Inspector General's office. Below the seal is inscribed DEPARTMENT OF DEFENSE. On the Reverse it is inscribed FOR MERITORIOUS SERVICE.
