= DoD Inspector General Distinguished Service Award =

Award of the US Department of Defense

Department of Defense Inspector General Distinguished Service Award
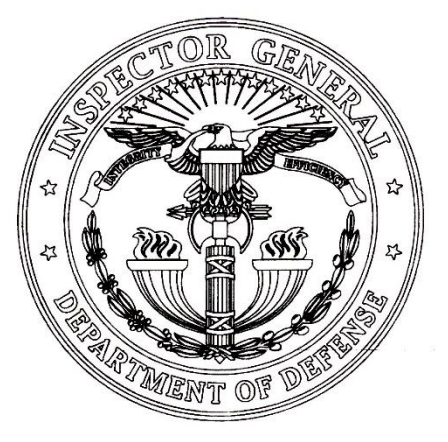
- Type: Civilian Medal
- Country: United States
- Presented by: United States Department of Defense
- Eligibility: Career DoD civilian employees
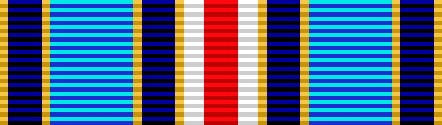
- Ribbon of the medal

Precedence
- Next (lower): DoD Inspector General Medal for Superior Civilian Service

The Department of Defense Inspector General Medal for Distinguished Service is the highest civilian award given by the United States Department of Defense (DoD) Office of the Inspector General (OIG). The achievements or service must be exceptional and exceed the requirements of the position the individual holds and should greatly exceed others in a similar position in the OIG.

== Criteria ==
- This decoration is awarded for contributions that are unusual and/or significant that recognition by the Inspector General is warranted. Recognition should be based on, but not limited to:
  1. Exceptional devotion to duty and significant contributions to the efficiency, economy, or another improvement in the operations of the OIG or DoD.
  2. Accomplishments demonstrating exceptional management ability, innovative thinking, or outstanding leadership that benefit the OIG.
  3. Accomplishments resulting in major cost saving, reduction or avoidance.
  4. Courageous and voluntary risk of personal safety in the performance of their duties that benefited the US government or its personnel.
  5. Other exemplary service or contribution. (Normally, the nominee has previously received the DoD Inspector General Medal for Superior Civilian Service and/or the DoD Inspector General Medal for Meritorious Civilian Service.)

== Eligibility ==
Office of the Inspector General (DoD) employees who meet all of the following criteria are eligible for consideration:

1. Must be a permanent civilian employee with at least one year of OIG service. (The length of service requirement may be waived if the award is for an act of heroism.)
2. Must have no pending or final performance or adverse actions against him/her during at least three years before the nomination date for this award.
3. Must be a United States citizen.

== Description ==
The medal is circular gold plated with the words INSPECTOR GENERAL inscribed above the seal of the Department of Defense Inspector General's office. Below the seal is inscribed DEPARTMENT OF DEFENSE. On the reverse it is inscribed FOR DISTINGUISHED SERVICE.

== See also ==
- Awards and decorations of the United States government
