= Claude M. Kicklighter =

United States Army officer

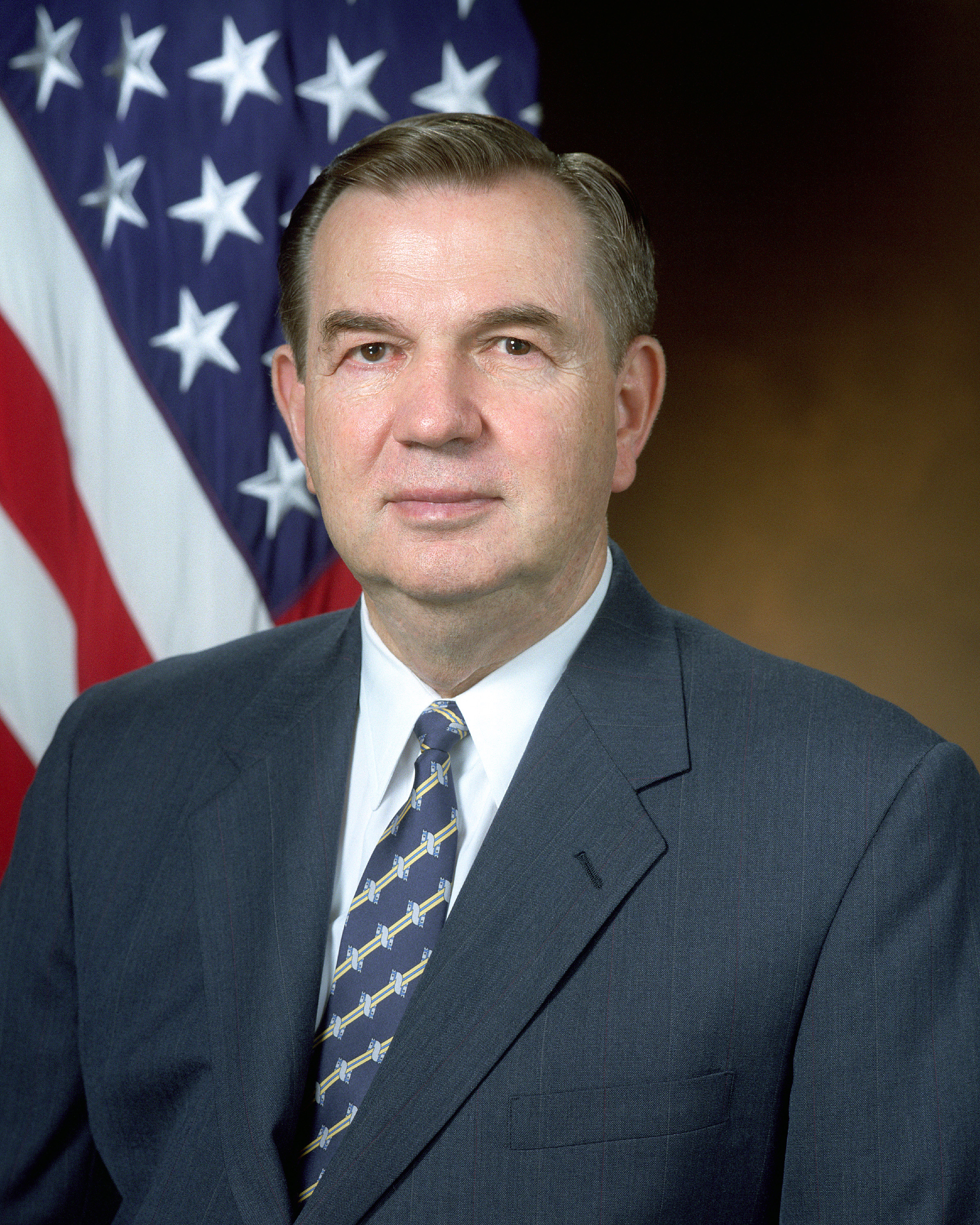

Inspector General of the Department of Defense
- In office April 30, 2007 – July 14, 2008
- President: George W. Bush
- Secretary: Robert Gates
- Preceded by: Thomas Gimble (Acting)
- Succeeded by: Gordon S. Heddell

Personal details
- Born: August 22, 1933 (age 92) Glennville, Georgia, U.S.
- Education: Mercer University (BA); George Washington University (MA)

Military service
- Allegiance: United States
- Branch/service: United States Army
- Rank: Lieutenant General
- Commands: United States Army Western Command
- Battles/wars: Vietnam War
- Kicklighter's voice Kicklighter testifies on the misuse of funds in the reconstruction of Iraq; Recorded March 11, 2008

Claude Milton "Mick" Kicklighter Sr. (born August 22, 1933) is a retired United States Army officer. He is a former commander of the United States Army Western Command (later United States Army Pacific), which he held from 1989 to 1991. He was also Director for Security Assistance for the US Army Security Assistance Center and Chief of Staff for the US Army Materiel Development and Readiness Command (DARCOM) in Alexandria, Virginia, from 1981 to 1984 and Assistant Deputy Chief of Staff for Logistics and Director of the Army Staff for the Office of Chief of Staff in Washington, D.C. Kicklighter was commander of the 25th Infantry Division from 1984 until being succeeded by James W. Crysel in 1986.

He is an alumnus of Glennville High School, Georgia Military College, The University of Georgia, Mercer University (B.A. in biology, June 1955), George Washington University (M.A. in Management of National Resources, August 1974), and the Industrial College of the Armed Forces. In 2007, he was named Inspector General of the Department of Defense, having previously served as Chief of Staff, Department of Veterans Affairs, Special Advisor to the Deputy Secretary of State for Stabilization and Security Operations in Iraq and Afghanistan, Director of the Department of Defense's Iraq Transition Team, Assistant Secretary for Policy and Planning, Department of Veterans Affairs and Deputy Under Secretary of the Army for International Affairs.

His awards include the Distinguished Service Medal, the Defense Superior Service Medal, the Legion of Merit, and the Bronze Star Medal. He retired from the Army in 1991.

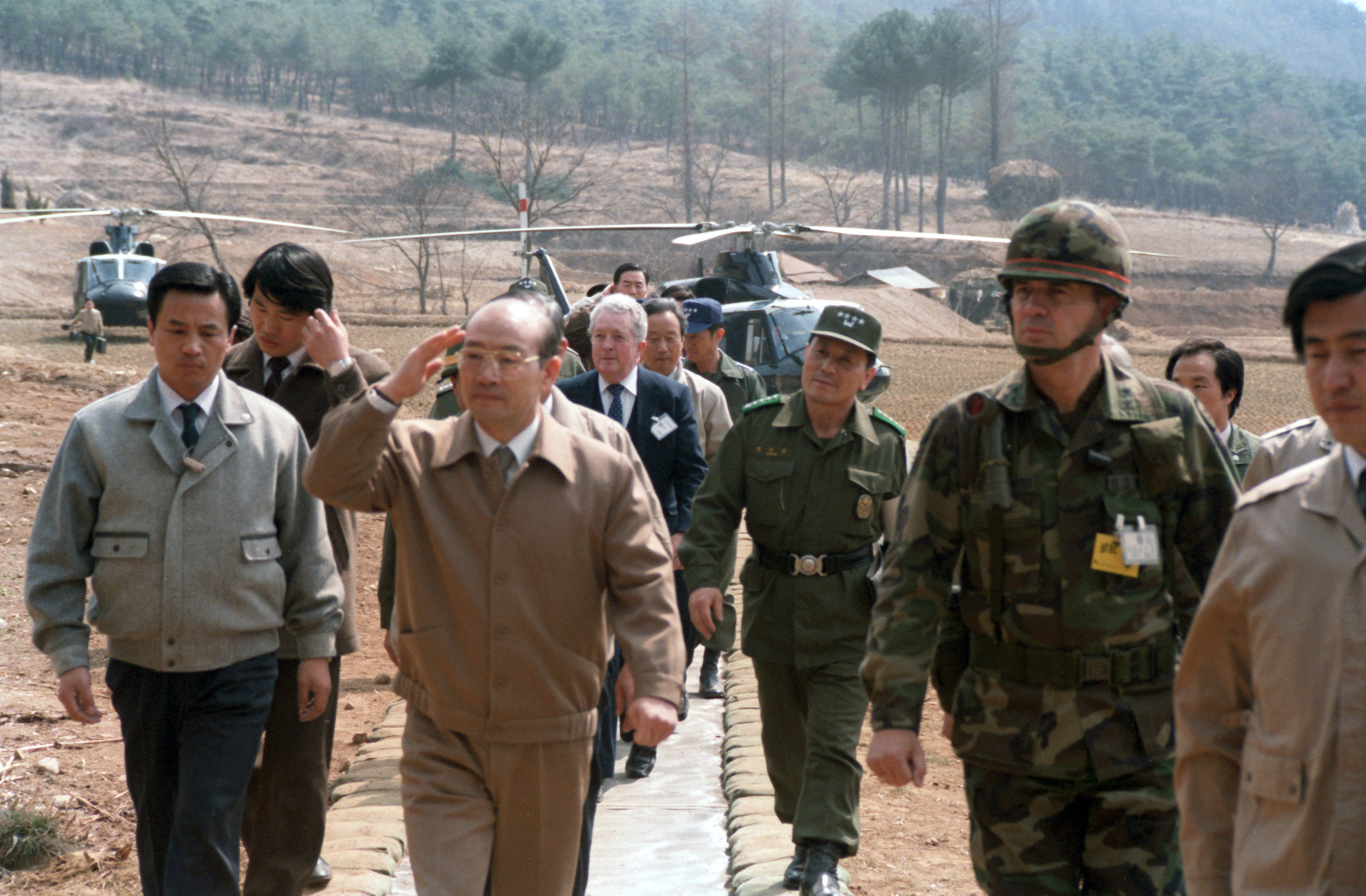
Major General Kicklighter with Korean strongman Chun Doo-hwan in March 1985
