= Second United States Army =

Second Army
- Second Army's Shoulder Sleeve Insignia
- Active: October 1918 – April 1919; October 1933 – January 1966; July 1983 – July 1995; March 2014 – April 2017
- Country: United States of America
- Branch: United States Army
- Type: Field army
- Part of: Regular Army
- Motto: "Tout Préparé"
- Engagements: World War I; Lorraine 1918

Commanders
- Notable commanders: William Simpson; Leonard T. Gerow; Edward H. Brooks; George Windle Read, Jr.

Insignia
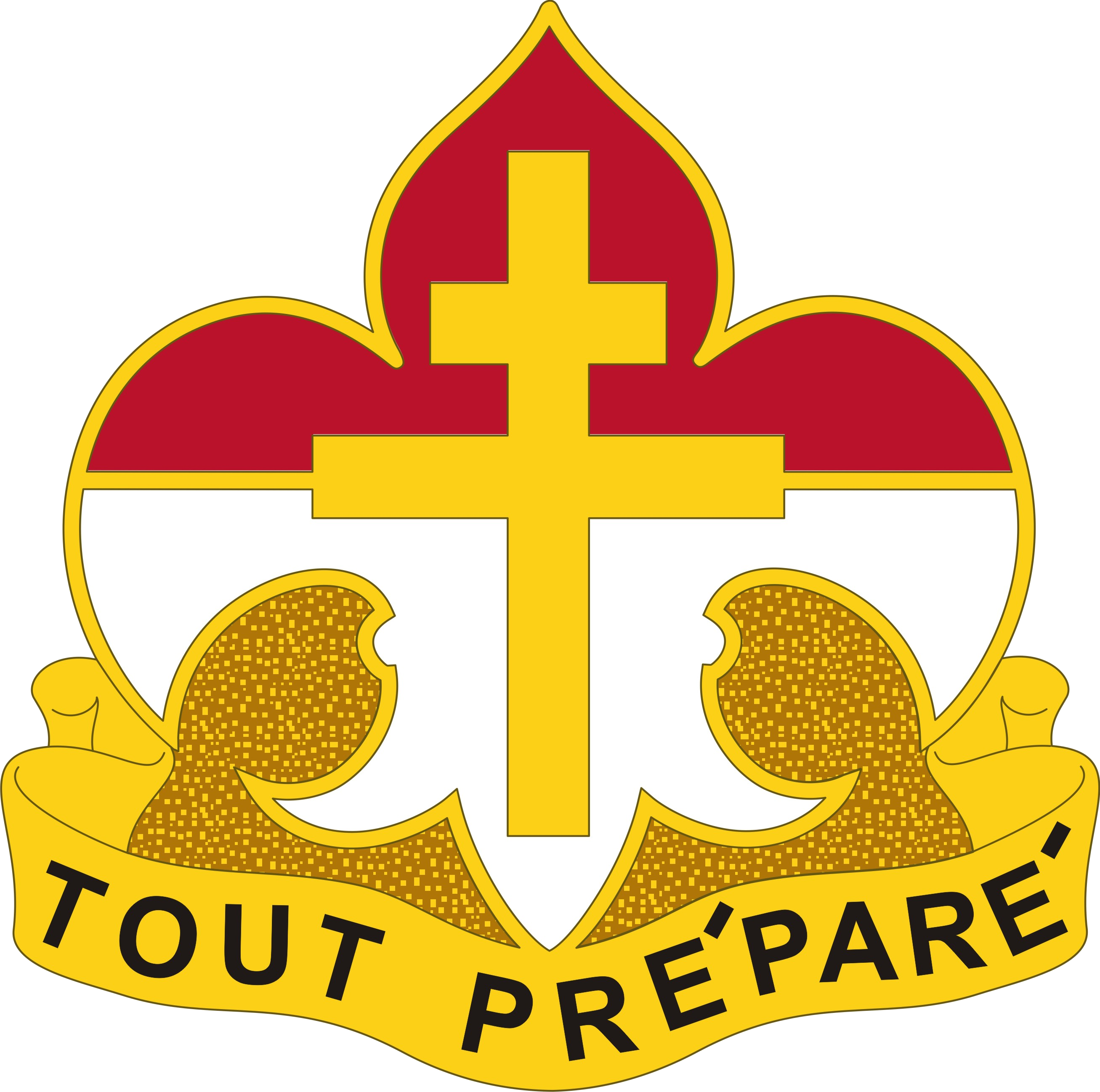
- Second Army's distinctive unit insignia

- Flag

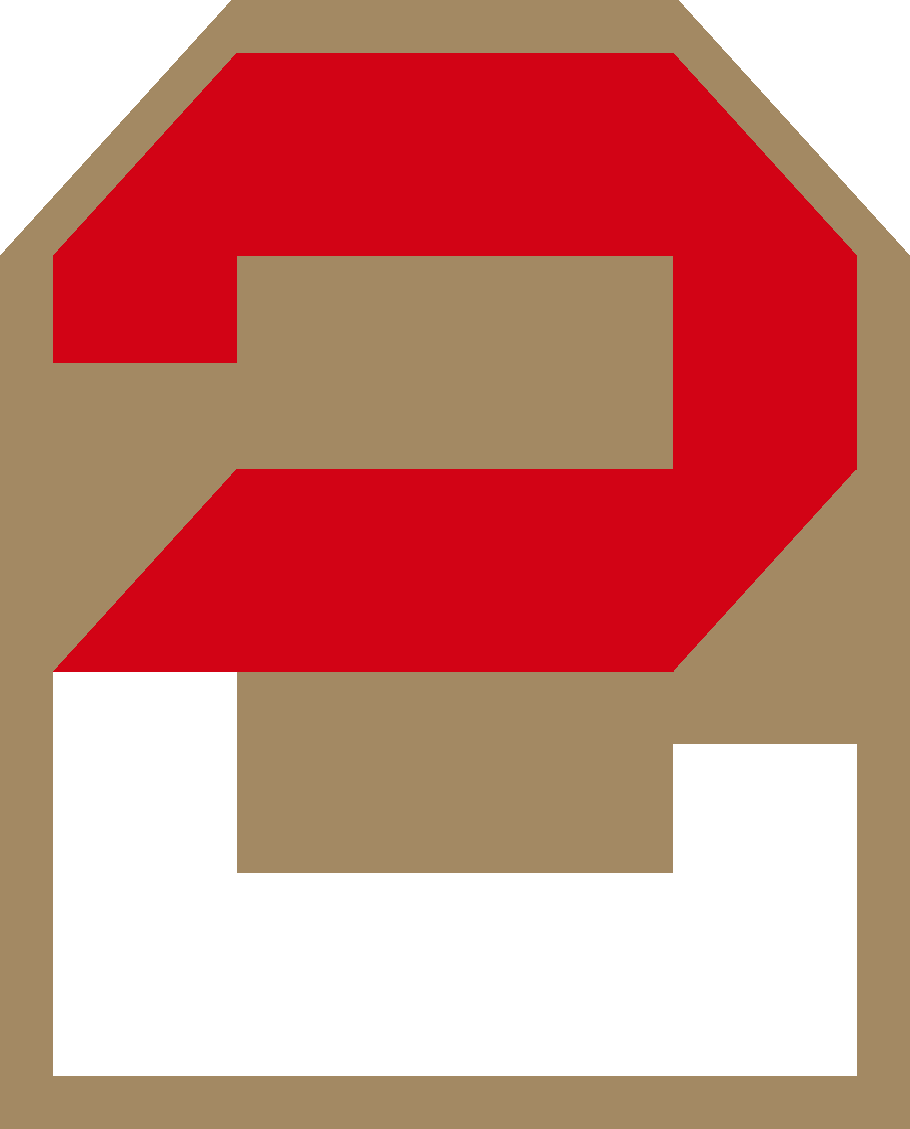
- Second Army's SSI Prior to 1950s

Second Army was most recently located at Fort Belvoir, Virginia as a Direct Reporting Unit to Headquarters U.S. Army, Chief Information Officer (CIO)/G-6. Under the CIO/G-6, Second Army served as the single point of contact for Army missions and functions related to reporting on, assessing, planning, coordinating, integrating, synchronizing, directing and conducting Army network operations. This mission ended after a 2017 reorganization, when the Second Army was inactivated.

== History ==
Second Army, American Expeditionary Forces (AEF), was established in October 1918 during World War I and demobilized in April 1919. A new Second Army operated from 1933 to 1966, and 1983 to 1995, as a training army in the continental United States.

On 1 October 2010, U.S. Army Cyber Command (ARCYBER) was formed as the Army service component command supporting U.S. Cyber Command, commanded by Lt. Gen. Rhett A. Hernandez. On 6 March 2014, Army headquarters activated Second Army as a direct reporting unit of Army CIO/G-6 with Commander, ARCYBER, dual-hatted as the Second Army Commander.

=== World War I ===
The history of the Second Army began as a fighting army on the battlefields of France in the waning days of World War I. Eager to maintain a hard-fought momentum to drive the Germans out of France, on 10 October 1918, General John J. "Black Jack" Pershing, Commander of the American Expeditionary Forces (AEF), selected Lieutenant General Robert L. Bullard to command the newly activated Second Army, AEF. Bullard, a Spanish–American War veteran, earned Pershing's confidence and reputation as an aggressive commander, after leading the 1st Infantry Division during the battle of Cantigny. At Cantigny, Bullard delivered the first American victory of the war. Bullard's orders for Second Army were to hold the line on a portion of the St. Mihiel sector along the Lorraine front. In November, General Pershing ordered Second Army to advance toward Metz. Bullard subsequently launched rigorous attacks against the Germans on 10 November. The 7th, 28th, 33rd, and 92nd divisions, then on the Second Army front, began the attacks. Encountering stubborn resistance, Second Army made a considerable advance, recovering a total of approximately 25 square miles of French territory before the armistice terminated hostilities on 11 November. During its first month of combat operations, 102 soldiers serving under Second Army earned the Distinguished Service Cross. After the armistice, Second Army occupied an area in Belgium and Luxembourg, remaining there until the end of March 1919, and demobilized in France on 15 April 1919.

=== Interwar period ===
==== Second Army (I) ====
The Second Army was authorized by the National Defense Act of 1920 and was to be primarily composed of Regular Army and National Guard units from the Fourth, Fifth, and Sixth Corps Areas. The army Headquarters and Headquarters Company (HHC) were constituted in the Organized Reserve on 15 October 1921 and allotted to the Sixth Corps Area. Chicago, Illinois, was designated as the army headquarters on organization, but it was never organized at that location. The Headquarters Company was initiated on 5 August 1922 in Chicago, and was relocated on 18 April 1924 to Oglesby, Illinois. The HHC were withdrawn from the Organized Reserve on 15 September 1927 and demobilized.

==== Second Army (II) ====
The HHC, Second Army, was reconstituted in the Regular Army on 9 August 1932 and allotted to the Sixth Corps Area. The headquarters was organized 22 August 1932 at Chicago, while the Headquarters Company was organized 26 February 1935 at Chicago. Due to the abandonment in 1933 of the “Six Army” plan in favor of the “Four Army” plan, the Second Army area was restructured to include only the Fifth and Sixth Corps Areas. The Fourth Corps Area was transferred to the Third Army. The Second Army's mission was to develop defense and operational plans for contingencies near the Great Lakes and the north-central United States, review the mobilization plans of the Fifth and Sixth Corps Areas, and oversee the training of units in the Army area. As part of the responsibility to oversee training, the Second Army staff planned, conducted, and/or participated in three major maneuvers between 1936 and 1941.

The August 1936 maneuvers were actually two separate exercises and were held at Fort Knox, Kentucky, for the Fifth Corps Area troops, and at Camp Custer-Allegan, Michigan, for the Sixth Corps Area troops. The maneuvers, though in separate locations, were tied together by a common scenario and included significant numbers of United States Army Air Corps and mechanized units. The next Second Army maneuver was also a split exercise, this time under the command of Lieutenant General Stanley H. Ford. Held in August-September 1940, the maneuver was conducted near Fort Knox for the Fifth Corps Area troops, and at Camp McCoy, Wisconsin, for the Sixth Corps Area contingent. The primary focus of this exercise was to train the army and corps staffs, all of which had been provisionally organized with Reserve and Regular officers and men from corps area staffs. Following the 1940 maneuver, the Second Army order of battle was changed to reflect the assignment of the VII Corps to the troop list, and the loss of the V and VI Corps to the Third and First Armies, respectively. Additionally, the Headquarters Company, Second Army was activated 18 November 1940 at Chicago.

To have more efficient command and control of the Second Army’s subordinate units, then mobilizing and concentrating in Missouri, Arkansas, and Louisiana, Lieutenant General Ben Lear moved the army headquarters to 44 South Second Street, Memphis, Tennessee, on 5 December 1940. The final maneuver in which the Second Army participated prior to World War II was the huge GHQ maneuvers in the Louisiana Maneuver Area in September 1941. The exercise included over 120,000 Second Army soldiers from Regular and National Guard units. The maneuver was conducted against the units of the Third Army between Shreveport and Lake Charles, Louisiana, 15–28 September 1941. Five corps, 18 divisions, and numerous support units participated in this exercise, which was the largest peacetime military maneuver ever conducted in the United States. These maneuvers were designed to test and validate a myriad of doctrinal and organizational ideas, and to provide a basis for modernizing the U.S. Army. Following the maneuvers, the Second Army Headquarters and Headquarters Company returned to Memphis, where they were located on 7 December 1941.

=== World War II ===
During World War II, Second Army trained 11 corps, 55 divisions, and 2,000 smaller units of all arms and services, totaling almost a million men, for employment in all theaters of operation.

=== Post-World War II ===
In June 1946, Second Army was reformed from Headquarters Third Service Command at Baltimore, Maryland. It became one of six Continental Armies under the Army Ground Forces. Second Army encompassed the seven states of Delaware, Kentucky, Maryland, Ohio, Pennsylvania, Virginia, and West Virginia, and the District of Columbia. In June 1947, Second Army Headquarters moved to Fort George G. Meade, Maryland. On 1 January 1957, the Army redesignated Second Army as Second United States Army, as one of the six Zone of Interior Armies of the United States. Second U.S. Army commanded, supervised operations, trained and provided administrative and logistical services to ensure the continued operational readiness of its assigned combat and support units in the active Army, Army Reserves and National Guard.

At the height of the Cold War, Second U.S. Army helped mobilize forces for potential conflict. During the Berlin Crisis of 1961, Second U.S. Army mobilized 39 National Guard and Army Reserve units in the seven state area and eight Army Reserve units from other Army areas. During the Cuban Missile Crisis, Second U.S. Army deployed 41 units, which comprised more than 5,700 military personnel.

Reorganizations within the U.S. Army led to Second U.S. Army being inactivated twice from 1966 to 1995. On 1 January 1966, First and Second U.S. Armies merged, resulting in the inactivation of Second U.S. Army. In July 1983, Second U.S. Army reactivated at Fort Gillem, Georgia, and assumed responsibility for Reserve Component matters in seven states and two territories formerly belonging to First Army. In July 1995, First Army left Fort Meade, Maryland, and reorganized at Fort Gillem, upon the inactivation of Second U.S. Army.

=== Army Cyber Command ===
The establishment of U.S. Army Cyber Command in 2010 earmarked the Army's entry into the new operational domain of cyberspace and perpetuated the lineage and honors of Second Army. The 1 October 2010, Headquarters, Department of the Army (HQDA) General Orders No. 2010–26, which established Army Cyber Command, stated that it would "perpetuate the lineage and honors of the Second Army as specified by the United States Army Center of Military History." The Army Center of Military History agreed to use the naming convention established for geographic Army Service Component Commands, which would not have numbered Army designations; that is, the designation would be U.S. Army Cyber Command and not "Second Army"; only the lineage and honors of Second Army would be assigned to Army Cyber Command. General Orders No. 2010–26 redesignated the inactive Headquarters and Headquarters Company, Second U. S. Army, as U.S. Army Cyber Command, with its headquarters at Fort Belvoir, Virginia.

On 6 March 2014, HQDA General Orders No. 2014-02, activated a new unit designated Second Army as a Direct Reporting Unit of the Army Chief Information Officer/G-6, HQDA, with the Commander, U.S. Army Cyber Command as the Commander, Second Army. The General Orders also resulted in the Second Army lineage and honors being withdrawn from Army Cyber Command and assigned to the new unit. The U.S. Army Network Enterprise Technology Command (NETCOM), formerly a Direct Reporting Unit of the Chief Information Officer/G-6, HQDA, which supported Army Cyber Command's mission, was assigned to Second Army in accordance with Title 10, United States Code, Section 162 (a) (2) to carry out the functions assigned to the Secretary of the Army in Titles 10, 40 and 44 United States Code. The resulting command and control arrangement, designating the Commander, U.S. Army Cyber Command, also as the Commander, Second Army, optimized the Army's force structure to better support Army Cyber Command's mission. The commander of NETCOM is dual-hatted as deputy commanding general (DCG), Second Army.

Second Army served as the single point of contact for Army missions and functions related to reporting on, assessing, planning, coordinating, integrating, synchronizing, directing and conducting Army network operations.

A 2017 reorganization eliminated the need for Second Army's network operations coordinating function, and the unit was inactivated on 31 March 2017. ARCYBER now continues the lineage and honors associated with Second Army, now that Network Enterprise Technology Command (NETCOM) is part of ARCYBER.

== Organization ==
Organization of the Army just before deactivation was as follows:

- United States Army Network Enterprise Technology Command (NETCOM)
- 1st Information Operations Command (Land)
- Cyber Protection Brigade
- 780th Military Intelligence Brigade

== Past Commanders ==
Date Began	Date Ended	Commanding General
October 1918	April 1919	Robert L. Bullard
August 1932	November 1933	Frank Parker
November 1933	February 1935	Preston Brown
February 1935	May 1936	Frank R. McCoy
May 1936	May 1936	Johnson Hagood
May 1936	September 1936	Dana T. Merrill (Acting)
September 1936	December 1936	Charles E. Kilbourne
December 1936	September 1937	William E. Cole (Acting)
September 1937	November 1938	Hugh A. Drum
November 1938	October 1940	Stanley H. Ford
October 1940	April 1943	Ben Lear
April 1943	March 1946	Lloyd R. Fredendall
April 1946	September 1946	William Hood Simpson (Acting since October 1945)
September 1946	October 1947	Albert C. Wedemeyer
October 1947	January 1948	John T. Lewis (Acting)
January 1948	July 1950	Leonard T. Gerow
August 1950	June 1951	James A. Van Fleet
June 1951	April 1953	Edward H. Brooks
April 1953	September 1953	Leslie D. Carter (Acting)
September 1953	April 1956	Floyd L. Parks
April 1956	October 1957	Charles E. Hart
October 1957	August 1960	George W. Read Jr.
August 1960	May 1962	Ridgely Gaither
May 1962	July 1964	John S. Upham Jr.
July 1964	January 1966	William F. Train
July 1983	July 1985	Charles P. Graham
July 1985	December 1987	Johnny J. Johnston
December 1987	February 1990	Orren R. Whiddon
February 1990	July 1992	James W. Crysel
July 1992	December 1994	Samuel E. Ebbesen
December 1994	May 1995	Robert F. Foley (Acting)
May 1995	July 1995	Guy A. J. LaBoa
March 2014	October 2016	Edward C. Cardon
October 2016	March 2017	Paul M. Nakasone
