= William F. Train =

United States Army general

William F. Train II
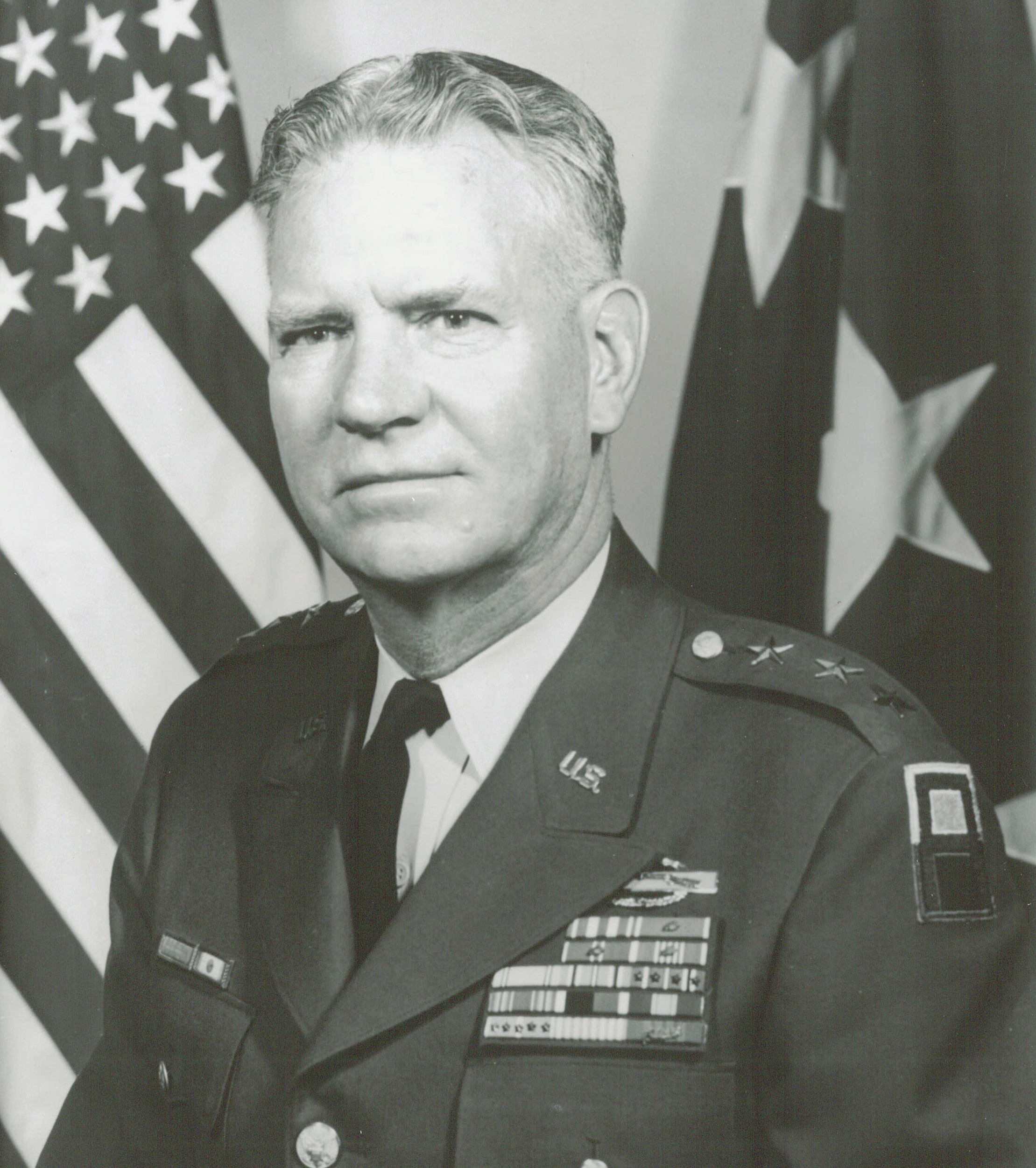
- Born: January 23, 1908; Savannah, Georgia, U.S.
- Died: November 27, 2006 (aged 98); San Mateo, California, U.S.
- Burial place: West Point Cemetery
- Military career
- Allegiance: United States
- Branch: United States Army
- Service years: 1926–1967
- Rank: Lieutenant General
- Commands: First United States Army; Second United States Army; United States Army War College; 4th Infantry Division
- Conflicts: World War II; Korean War
- Awards: Distinguished Service Medal; Silver Star Medal; Legion of Merit (2); Bronze Star Medal (2)

William Frew Train II (January 23, 1908 – November 27, 2006) was a United States Army lieutenant general and veteran of World War II and the Korean War.

== Early life ==
William Train was born and raised in Savannah, Georgia. Orphaned when he was 17, he enlisted in the United States Army as a private in 1926 and retired 41 years later as a three-star general.

== Military career ==
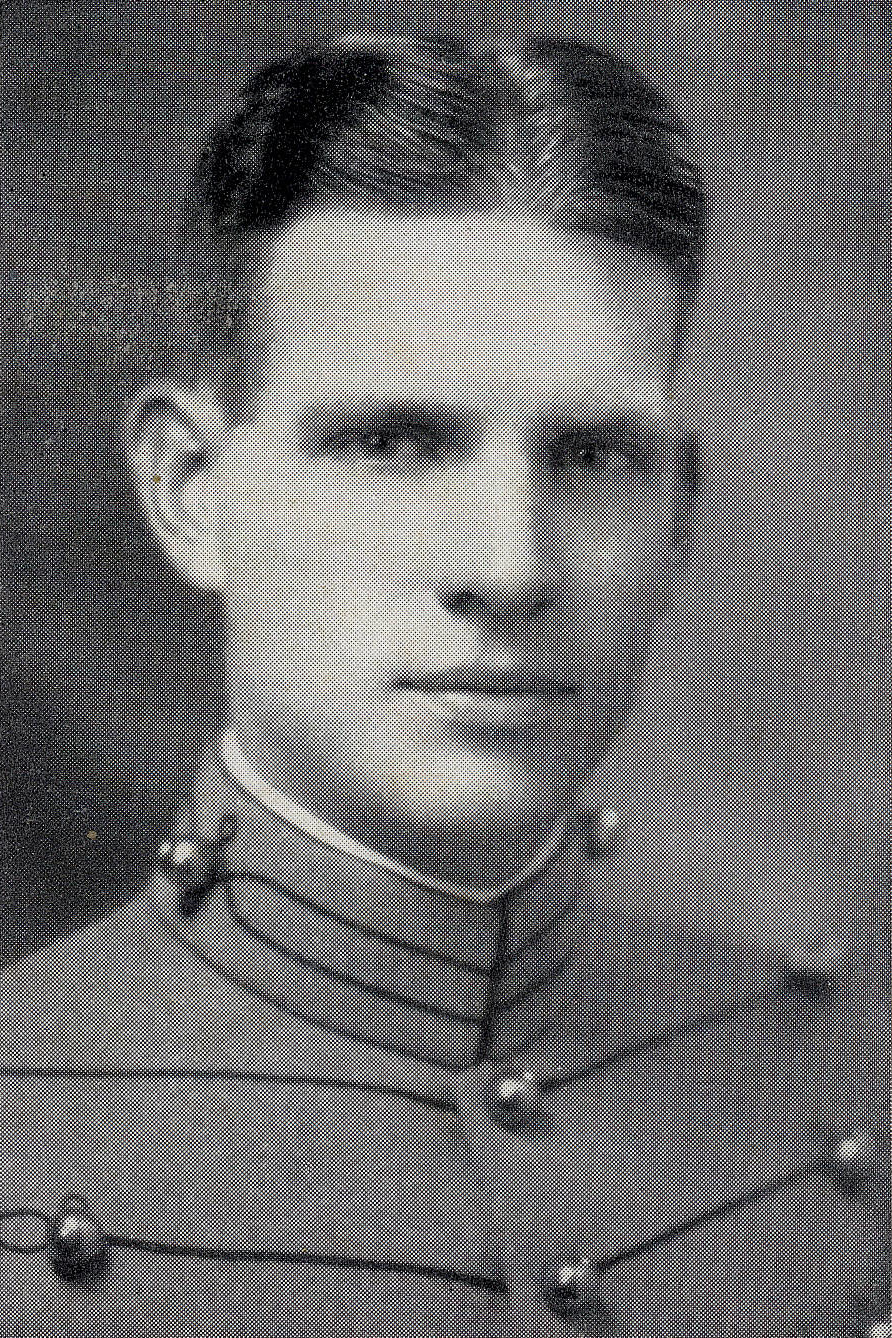
Train as a United States Military Academy cadet c. 1931

In 1927, Private Train placed first among army enlisted men competing for admission to the United States Military Academy at West Point. He graduated from West Point in 1931 and was commissioned as a second lieutenant.

In 1933, one of his first posts was second-in-command at Camp Roosevelt, the first Civilian Conservation Corps camp established in the George Washington National Forest in central Virginia.

=== World War II ===
Shortly after the 1941 attack on Pearl Harbor, Captain Train was summoned to the War Department General Staff to serve in the newly built Pentagon helping to organize the war effort and earning the Legion of Merit.

Later during World War II, Train served in the Italian campaign in 1943 for several months and then, in October 1944, he joined the 28th Infantry Division fighting on the Siegfried Line. The Siegfried Line was the defensive barrier at the German border to which the German army had retreated in the summer and fall of 1944 after the American and British invasion at Normandy on June 6, 1944.

In trying to break through the Siegfried Line in November 1944, Train's division was stopped by fierce German resistance during the Battle of Huertgen Forest, the bloodiest battle of the war in Europe on the American side. After suffering devastating losses, the 28th Division was moved to a quiet sector of the front line in northern Luxemburg and southern Belgium.

This placed them directly in the path of the massive German surprise attack in the Battle of the Bulge, launched on December 16, 1944. Lieutenant Colonel Train was Assistant Regimental Commander of the 112th Infantry Regiment of the 28th Division. His regiment held its position for the first two days of the attack against overwhelming odds and then participated in the defense of St. Vith in southern Belgium, a key road junction. These defensive actions seriously disrupted the northern sector of the German attack, which ground to a halt on December 26. Two days earlier, on December 24, Train's regiment—which had become surrounded by the German forces—was able to safely withdraw to the new American lines with the rest of the St. Vith defenders. Train was awarded the Silver Star for his leadership and bravery during the battle. He also received two Bronze Star Medals for his World War II service.

After the war, he graduated from the Imperial Defence College in 1947.

=== Korean War ===
Train served in Korea in 1950 and 1951 during the intense fighting of the first year of that war. As plans officer for the Eighth United States Army, he was responsible for planning five campaigns, beginning with the breakout from the Pusan Perimeter. Train was awarded his second Legion of Merit for his Korean War service.

=== Final posts ===
Train graduated from the Army War College in 1952 and the Command and General Staff College in 1957.

Later in his career, Train commanded the 4th Infantry Division from 1960 to 1962, the United States Army War College from 1962 to 1964. He commanded Second United States Army from 1964 until it was inactivated and combined with First United States Army on January 1, 1966, at Fort Meade, Maryland. His final command of the newly combined First Army, responsible for all Army forces and facilities in the northeast United States from Virginia to Maine, concluded an active duty career on 41 years with his retirement on May 31, 1967.

== Family ==
Train was survived by Charlotte Gibner Train, his wife of 70 years. He was also survived by his daughter, Leslie, his son, Bruce, and his grandson, Zachary. He suffered the loss of his first son, Lieutenant William F. Train III (June 26, 1937 – June 16, 1962), who was the sixth American advisor killed in South Vietnam.

Train and his wife had settled in San Mateo, California after his retirement. His son had been buried at the West Point Cemetery and Train's ashes were interred next to his son on March 29, 2007.

== Awards and decorations ==
Combat Infantryman Badge
Office of the Secretary of Defense Identification Badge
Army Staff Identification Badge

Army Distinguished Service Medal
Silver Star
Legion of Merit with one oak leaf cluster
Bronze Star with one oak leaf cluster
Army Commendation Medal with one oak leaf cluster
Army Presidential Unit Citation
American Defense Service Medal
American Campaign Medal
European-African-Middle Eastern Campaign Medal with four service stars
World War II Victory Medal
Army of Occupation Medal
National Defense Service Medal with one Oak Leaf Cluster
Korean Service Medal with five service stars
French Croix de guerre with bronze palm
Republic of Korea Presidential Unit Citation
United Nations Korea Medal
