= Gordon S. Heddell =

Gordon Heddell
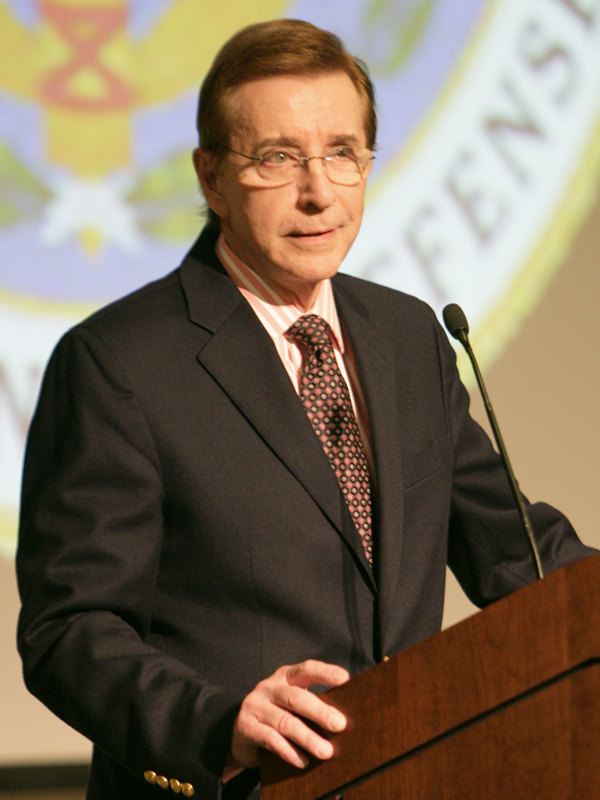

Inspector General of the Department of Defense
- In office July 14, 2008 – December 25, 2011; Acting: July 14, 2008 – July 14, 2009
- President: George W. Bush; Barack Obama
- Preceded by: Mick Kicklighter
- Succeeded by: Lynne Halbrooks (Acting)

Inspector General of the Department of Labor
- In office January 2, 2001 – July 15, 2008
- President: Bill Clinton; George W. Bush
- Preceded by: Patricia Dalton (Acting)
- Succeeded by: Daniel Petrole (Acting)

Personal details
- Born: August 13, 1943 (age 82) St. Louis, Missouri, U.S.
- Education: University of Missouri, St. Louis (BA); University of Illinois, Springfield (MA)

Gordon S. Heddell (born August 13, 1943, in St Louis) is a former Inspector General (IG) of the United States Department of Defense. Previously, Heddell also served as Inspector General for the Department of Labor.

== Early government experience ==
Heddell began his government service as a U.S. Army chief warrant officer and helicopter pilot, serving in both South Korea and Taiwan during the Vietnam War. After leaving the military, he served as a special agent in the United States Secret Service for 28 years. While with the Secret Service, Heddell served as special agent-in-charge of the Vice Presidential Protective Division, leading and managing the physical protection of the Vice President of the United States. He eventually rose to the position of assistant director for inspections, serving as a key advisor to the director, providing advice and counsel on all facets of Secret Service leadership and operations.

== Inspector general service ==
From 2001 to 2008, Heddell served as inspector general of the U.S. Department of Labor, where he led efforts to combat labor racketeering and organized crime in the workplace; fraud against the Foreign Labor Certification Program; and weaknesses in the Mine Safety and Health Administration.

Heddell was sworn in as the seventh inspector general for the Department of Defense on July 14, 2009, one year after being appointed as acting inspector general. Heddell is responsible for directing audits, investigations, and inspections, and for developing audit and investigative policy in the largest federal office of Inspector General, with a workforce of over 1,600 and an annual budget exceeding $300 million. In this capacity, Heddell provides oversight of all the programs and operations of the Department of Defense and military services, including ongoing military operations in Southwest Asia.

In 2010, Heddell directed and led the Department of Defense oversight efforts that achieved $6.4 billion in monetary benefits and investigative recoveries, and conducted criminal investigations resulting in 281 indictments and 245 convictions.

As inspector general, Heddell served on the executive committee of the federal Council of Inspectors General for Integrity and Efficiency, chaired the Information Technology Committee, and was editor-in-chief of the Journal of Public Inquiry. Heddell was also the chair of the Defense Council on Integrity and Efficiency and served as the chair of the Interagency Coordination Group of Inspectors General for Guam Realignment.

== Recognition ==
Heddell is a recipient of the Meritorious Presidential Rank Award for outstanding government service. He was also selected by the University of Illinois Alumni Association as its recipient of the 2009 Alumni Achievement Award for alumni of the University of Illinois at Springfield.

== Education ==
Heddell received his bachelor's degree from the University of Missouri-St. Louis, his master's degree from Sangamon State University (today known as the University of Illinois at Springfield), and was a Woodrow Wilson public service fellow from 1994 to 2000. Heddell graduated at the top of his Treasury Federal Law Enforcement Academy class.

Heddell created a partnership between the Secret Service and two inner city Washington D.C. public schools.

== See also ==
- Office of the Inspector General, U.S. Department of Defense
- Recovery Accountability and Transparency Board
