= James W. Crysel =

United States Army general

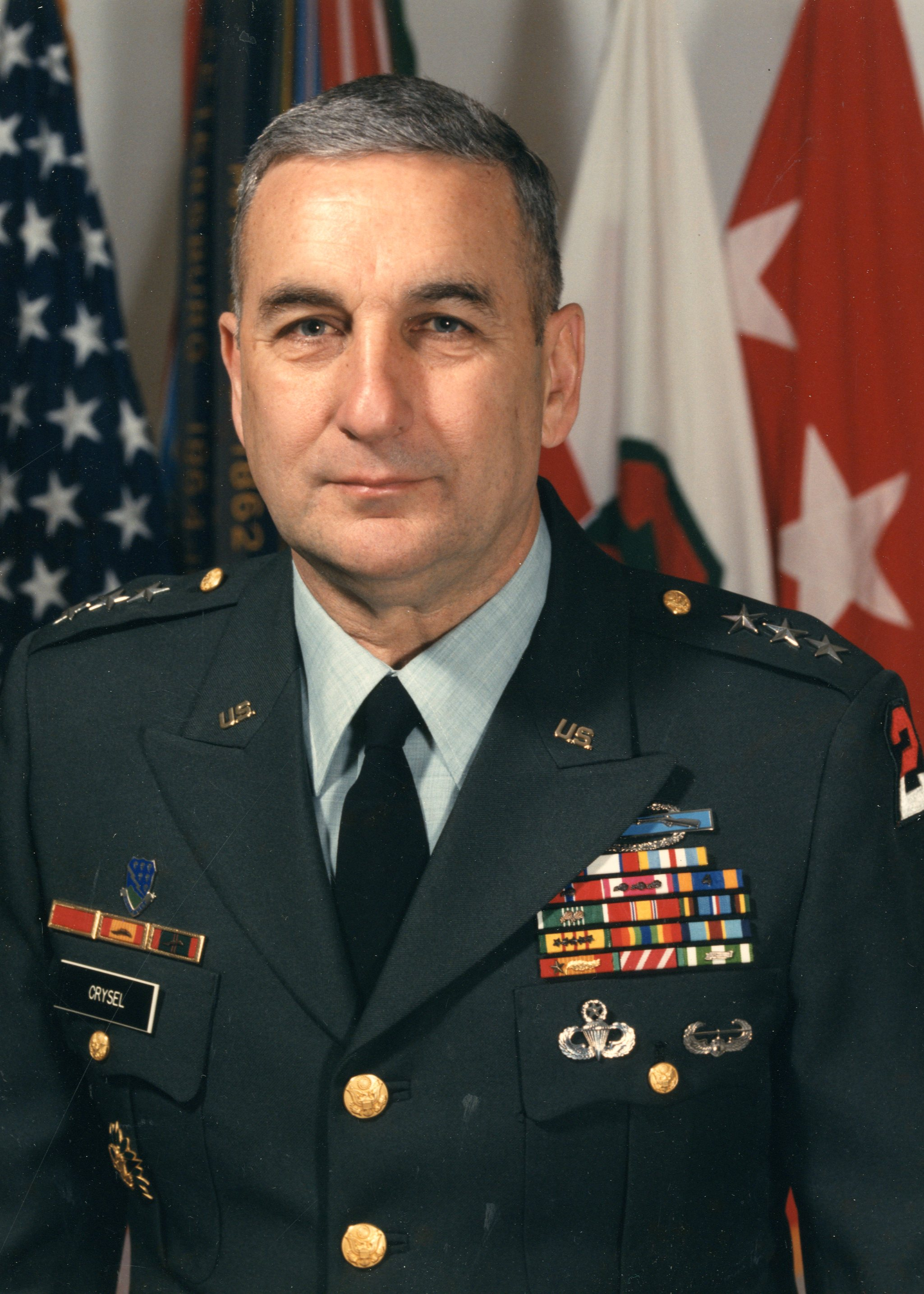
- Born: May 18, 1937 (age 89); Luverne, Alabama, U.S.
- Military career
- Allegiance: United States of America
- Branch: United States Army
- Service years: 1959–1992
- Rank: Lieutenant General
- Unit: United States Army Infantry Branch
- Commands: Second United States Army; Total Army Personnel Agency; 25th Infantry Division; 3rd Brigade, 2nd Infantry Division; 1st Battalion, 506th Infantry Regiment
- Conflicts: Vietnam War
- Awards: Distinguished Service Medal; Defense Superior Service Medal; Bronze Star Medal

James W. Crysel (born May 18, 1937) is a retired United States Army officer who attained the rank of lieutenant general. He was notable for his command of Second United States Army and the 25th Infantry Division.

== Early life ==
James Wendell Crysel was born in Luverne, Alabama on May 18, 1937. He graduated from Stetson University in 1959 with a Bachelor of Science degree in business management. He completed the Reserve Officers' Training Corps program at Stetson, and was commissioned as a second lieutenant of Infantry. While at Stetson, Crysel also became a member of the Sigma Nu fraternity.

== Military education ==
Crysel's professional education included: Infantry Officer Basic Course; Infantry Officer Advanced Course; Military Intelligence Officer Advanced Course; United States Army Command and General Staff College; United States Army War College; and the Capstone Military Leadership Program.

While a student at the Army War College, Crysel also completed the requirements for his Master of Science degree in public administration from Shippensburg University of Pennsylvania.

== Early career ==
From 1963 to 1964, Crysel was assigned to Company E, 1st Airborne Battle Group, a unit of the 101st Airborne Division. From 1964 to 1965, he served with Company B and then Headquarters and Headquarters Company, 2nd Battalion, 506th Infantry Regiment, also 101st Division unit. During 1968, Crysel was plans and operations officer (S-3) for the Special Forces Operating Base (SFOB) at Duc Lap Camp. In 1969, Crysel commanded B-55 Detachment, 5th Mobile Strike Force Command in Vietnam. He was promoted to first lieutenant in 1962, captain in 1963, and major in 1967.

Crysel's field grade officer assignments included: operations officer and later officer in charge of joint military service participation for the 1973 Presidential Inauguration; executive officer of 1st Battalion, 3rd Infantry Regiment (The Old Guard); personnel staff officer in the Office of the Army's Deputy Chief of Staff for Personnel (G-1); commander, 1st Battalion, 506th Infantry Regiment; special assistant to the chief of staff, 101st Airborne Division (Air Assault); and assistant chief of staff for operations and director of plans and training (G-3), 101st Airborne Division. His later field grade officer positions included commander of 3rd Brigade, 2nd Infantry Division, and chief of staff for 2nd Infantry Division.

== Career as general officer ==
After receiving promotion to brigadier general, Crysel served as assistant division commander for support, 101st Airborne Division, and then as the division's assistant division commander for operations. From 1985 to 1986, he served as director of plans for the United States Pacific Command.

Crysel received promotion to major general in 1986, and commanded the 25th Infantry Division from 1986 to 1988. From 1988 to 1990, Crysel commanded the Total Army Personnel Agency in Alexandria, Virginia.

He was commander of Second United States Army from 1990 to 1993, and received promotion to lieutenant general. He retired in 1993.

== Awards and decorations ==
Crysel's awards include the Army Distinguished Service Medal and Defense Superior Service Medal. In addition, he received: the Bronze Star Medal (with one Oak leaf cluster); Meritorious Service Medal (with four Oak Leaf Clusters); Air Medal (with numeral 4); and Army Commendation Medal (with two Oak Leaf Clusters). In addition, Crysel received: the Combat Infantryman Badge; Expert Infantryman Badge; Master Parachutist, Air Assault, and Pathfinder Badges; and the Army Staff Identification Badge.

== Family ==
He is married to the former Trudy R. Eldridge. They have two children, Kirsten and James. In retirement, Crysel resided in Fripp Island, South Carolina.

== Sources ==
=== Books ===
- Department of the Army, Deputy Chief of Staff for Personnel (May 15, 1985). Department of the Army Pamphlet 360-10, Army Executive Biographies. Headquarters, Department of the Army: Washington, DC. p. 563.
- United States Army Adjutant General (1966). U.S. Army Register, entry for James Wendell Crysel. Vol. 1. Washington, DC: Headquarters, Department of the Army (via Ancestry.com). p. 129.
- United States Army Adjutant General (1972). U.S. Army Register, entry for James Wendell Crysel. Vol. 1. Washington, DC: Headquarters, Department of the Army (via Ancestry.com). p. 94.
- Jane's Defence Weekly. Vol. 6. Coulsdon, England: Jane's Publishing Company. 1986. p. 506.
- The Delta of Sigma Nu. Vol. 113–115. Lexington, VA: Sigma Nu Fraternity. 1996. p. 1. "Among Brother Crysel's awards and decorations are the Distinguished Service Medal, the Defense Superior Service Medal..."

=== Newspapers ===
- "Infantry Division Command Change". Honolulu Advertiser. Honolulu, HI. July 1, 1988. p. E-5.
- "Military News". Honolulu Advertiser. Honolulu, HI. April 28, 1985. p. E-4.
- "Army General Impressed After Camp Shelby Visit". Clarksdale Press Register. Clarksdale, MI. Associated Press. April 21, 1990. p. 2A.
- "Obituary, Georgia Lane Crysel". The Daily Home. Talladega, AL. March 24, 2013.

=== Internet ===
- Sams, Kenneth; Aton, Bert B. (March 10, 1969). "Project CHECO Southeast Asia Report" (PDF). www.dtic.mil/. Ft. Belvoir, VA: Defense Technical Information Center. Archived (PDF) from the original on March 15, 2017.
- Kilkenny, Kevin (2002). "2002 Currahee Veterans Reunion". old.506infantry.org/. Folsom, CA: 506th Airborne Infantry Regiment Association.
- "Presidential Nomination 886 — Maj. Gen. James W. Crysel — Army". Congress.gov. Washington, DC: United States Senate. February 5, 1990.
- Sherman, Steve (April 18, 2013). "Who's Who from 5th Mobile Strike Force Command (B-55 Staff) (Draft)". specialforcesbooks.com/. Houston, TX: Radix Press.

Military offices
Preceded by Orren R. Whiddon	Commanding General of the Second United States Army; 1990-1992	Succeeded by Samuel E. Ebbesen
Preceded by Claude M. Kicklighter	Commanding General of the 25th Infantry Division; 1986–1988	Succeeded by Charles P. Otstott
