= Leslie D. Carter =

U.S. Army major general

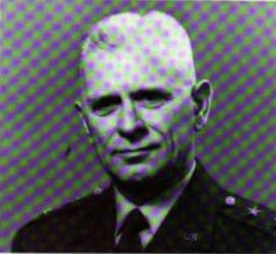
- From 1966's The 25th's 25th in Combat: Tropic Lightning, 1 Oct. 1941 - 1 Oct. 1966
- Born: October 24, 1895; Salem, Virginia, U.S.
- Died: March 23, 1992 (aged 96); Midlothian, Virginia, U.S.
- Burial place: Arlington National Cemetery
- Education: Roanoke College; United States Army Command and General Staff College
- Spouse: Elizabeth “Bettie” Fleming (m. 1924–1992)
- Children: 2
- Military career
- Service: United States Army
- Service years: 1917–1956
- Rank: Major General
- Service number: 010663
- Unit: U.S. Army Cavalry Branch
- Commands: Headquarters and Headquarters Troop, 6th Cavalry Regiment; Troop F, 3rd Cavalry Regiment; 44th Armored Regiment; Army General Ground School; 25th Infantry Division; Second United States Army (acting)
- Wars: World War I World War II; Korean War
- Awards: Legion of Merit (3); Bronze Star Medal (2); Legion of Honor (Chevalier) (France); Croix de Guerre with palm (France); Croix de Guerre with palm (Belgium)
- Other work: Director, The Valentine museum

Leslie D. Carter (October 24, 1895 – March 23, 1992) was a career officer in the United States Army. A native of Salem, Virginia, he served from 1917 to 1956 and was a veteran of World War I, World War II, and the Korean War. A Cavalry officer, Carter attained the rank of major general, and his command assignments included the 44th Armored Regiment, Army General Ground School, and 25th Infantry Division, and acting commander of Second United States Army.

Carter's major awards and decorations included the Legion of Merit (three awards), Bronze Star Medal with oak leaf cluster, Chevalier of the Legion of Honor (France), Croix de Guerre with palm (France), and Croix de Guerre with palm (Belgium). He died in Midlothian, Virginia on March 23, 1992, and was buried at Arlington National Cemetery.

== Early life ==
Carter was born in Salem, Virginia on October 24, 1895, a son of Edward R. Carter and Annie (Dillon) Carter. He was educated in Salem and was a graduate of Salem High School. He attended Roanoke College from 1914 to 1917, when he left college to enlist in the United States Army for World War I.

Carter attended Roanoke College again in 1922, but left without graduating in order to take up a new assignment at a different army post. In 1955, Roanoke College conferred upon Carter his Bachelor of Science degree as a member of the class of 1918. At the same commencement ceremony, Carter was awarded the honorary degree of Doctor of Science.

== Start of career ==
In July 1917, three months after the American entry into World War I, Carter enlisted in the United States Army and was assigned to Company B, 304th Field Signal Battalion. He was promoted to corporal in October 1917. In February 1918, he completed training to become an officer, and was commissioned as a second lieutenant of Cavalry in the Organized Reserve Corps.

Initially assigned to the 6th Cavalry Regiment, Carter, was subsequently assigned to the 32nd Infantry Regiment which was organized in Hawaii, then moved to Camp Kearny, California for organization and training as part of the 16th Division. He was promoted to temporary first lieutenant in October 1918. The Armistice of November 11, 1918 ended the war before the 16th Division departed for France, and it was demobilized in March 1919. Division commander David C. Shanks, who was also from Salem, Virginia, had previously commanded the Hoboken Port of Embarkation, and when the 16th Division was inactivated, he returned to Hoboken, which now served as a post-war port of debarkation. Carter was included in the contingent of division officers who move from Camp Kearny to Hoboken to aid Shanks in receiving U.S. military personnel, equipment, and vehicles as the army returned from France.

After the war, Carter was assigned to staff duty in the office of the chief of the Army Transport Service. In September 1920, Carter was appointed a second lieutenant in the regular army. In April 1921, he was promoted to permanent first lieutenant, and he completed the Cavalry Officer Basic Course later that year. He was a 1924 graduate of the company officers' course at the Signal School. Afterwards, he was assigned as commander of Headquarters and Headquarters Troop, 6th Cavalry, which was based at Fort Oglethorpe, Georgia. While with the 6th Cavalry, Carter took part in equestrian activities including horseshows, and won prizes for events including pairs jumping. The army promoted polo during the 1920s, believing the game enabled officers to develop leadership and decision-making skills, and Carter took part in numerous tournaments. In 1928, Carter was posted to the Philippines, and he was subsequently reassigned to duty at Fort Riley, Kansas. Carter was promoted to captain in June 1931.

== Continued career ==
In 1936, Carter graduated from the United States Army Command and General Staff College. Afterwards, he was assigned to command Troop F, 3rd Cavalry Regiment at Fort Myer, Virginia. He was promoted to major in August 1939. In October 1939, Carter left Fort Myer when he was assigned to duty as deputy chief of staff for Intelligence (G-2) with the Panama Canal Department.

With the army expanding in anticipation of entering World War II, in April 1941 Carter was promoted to temporary lieutenant colonel. In September 1941, he returned to the United States and was assigned to duty on the War Department General Staff. After returning to the United States, Carter was among the group of officers who were commended for their efforts to enhance the defenses of the Panama Canal and place the Panama Canal Zone on a wartime footing. In February 1942, Carter was promoted to temporary colonel. His promotion to lieutenant colonel became permanent in December 1942.

In March 1943, Carter was assigned to the 12th Armored Division at Fort Knox, Kentucky, where he assumed command of the division's 44th Armored Regiment. In November 1943, Carter was posted to Washington, D.C., where he was assigned to the staff of the Army Ground Forces headquarters. In 1944, Carter was assigned as assistant chief of staff for Intelligence (G-2) on the staff of VII Corps. The corps took part in the Operation Overlord invasion of Normandy on June 6, 1944, and continued in combat throughout France, Belgium, and Germany until the war ended in 1945. Carter continued to serve as the corps G-2 until he became G-2 of First United States Army.

== Later career ==
Carter's wartime experience resulted in him receiving equivalent credit for completion of the National War College. After World War II, he was assigned as chief of staff of the Antilles Department, which was headquartered at Fort Buchanan, Puerto Rico. He was subsequently assigned as chief of staff for the Army General Ground School (AGGS) at Fort Riley; the AGGS was in operation beginning in 1945, and included the army's Officer Candidate School, as well as courses in basic officer skills including land navigation, personnel administration, and military law. Carter was later appointed the school's deputy commandant. In February 1951, Carter was promoted to brigadier general and assigned to command the ground school.

In June 1951, Carter was assigned as chief of staff of Second United States Army, which was headquartered at Fort Meade, Maryland. In April 1953, Carter was promoted to temporary major general and assigned as Second Army's deputy commander. When Second Army's commander Edward H. Brooks retired later that month, Carter served as acting commander. In September 1953, Carter was posted to the Far East Command as the Korean War was drawing to a close, and he served as deputy chief of staff for personnel administration (G-1) for both Far East Command and the United Nations Command (UNC).

In May 1954, Carter was assigned to command the 25th Infantry Division in South Korea. During his command tour, he supervised the division's departure from Korea and return to its regular station at Schofield Barracks, Hawaii. In October 1954, his temporary major general's rank was made permanent. In November 1954, Carter was assigned as the UNC's representative on the United Nations Command Military Armistice Commission.

In April 1955, Carter was assigned to the Army Review Council, a body of senior civilian and military army leaders that made long range policy and strategy recommendations. In May 1956, Carter was assigned as special assistant to the commander of Second U.S. Army. He retired in December 1956.

== Retirement and death ==
After leaving the army, Carter purchased a country home in Midlothian, Virginia, which he christened The Bivouac. Among his activities were serving as director of Richmond's The Valentine museum and chairman of the Chesterfield County chapter of the American Red Cross. Carter died in Midlothian on March 23, 1992. He was buried at Arlington National Cemetery.

== Awards ==
Carter's major awards and decorations included:

- Legion of Merit with two oak leaf clusters
- Bronze Star Medal
- Legion of Honor (Chevalier) (France)
- Croix de Guerre (France)
- Croix de guerre (Belgium)

== Family ==
In December 1924, Carter married Elizabeth “Bettie” Fleming. She was the daughter of Colonel R. John Fleming, who commanded the 6th Cavalry, and granddaughter of Brigadier General George Simeon Grimes. They were the parents of two sons, Robert Fleming Carter (1925–1955) and Leslie Dillon Carter Jr. (b. 1926).

Captain Robert Carter was a 1946 graduate of the United States Military Academy (West Point) and veteran of the Korean War who died in a helicopter crash at Fort Benning. Leslie Carter Jr. graduated from West Point in 1948 and retired as a colonel. He was the husband of Virginia Harkins, the daughter of General Paul D. Harkins.
