= Edward H. Brooks =

US Army general (1893–1978)

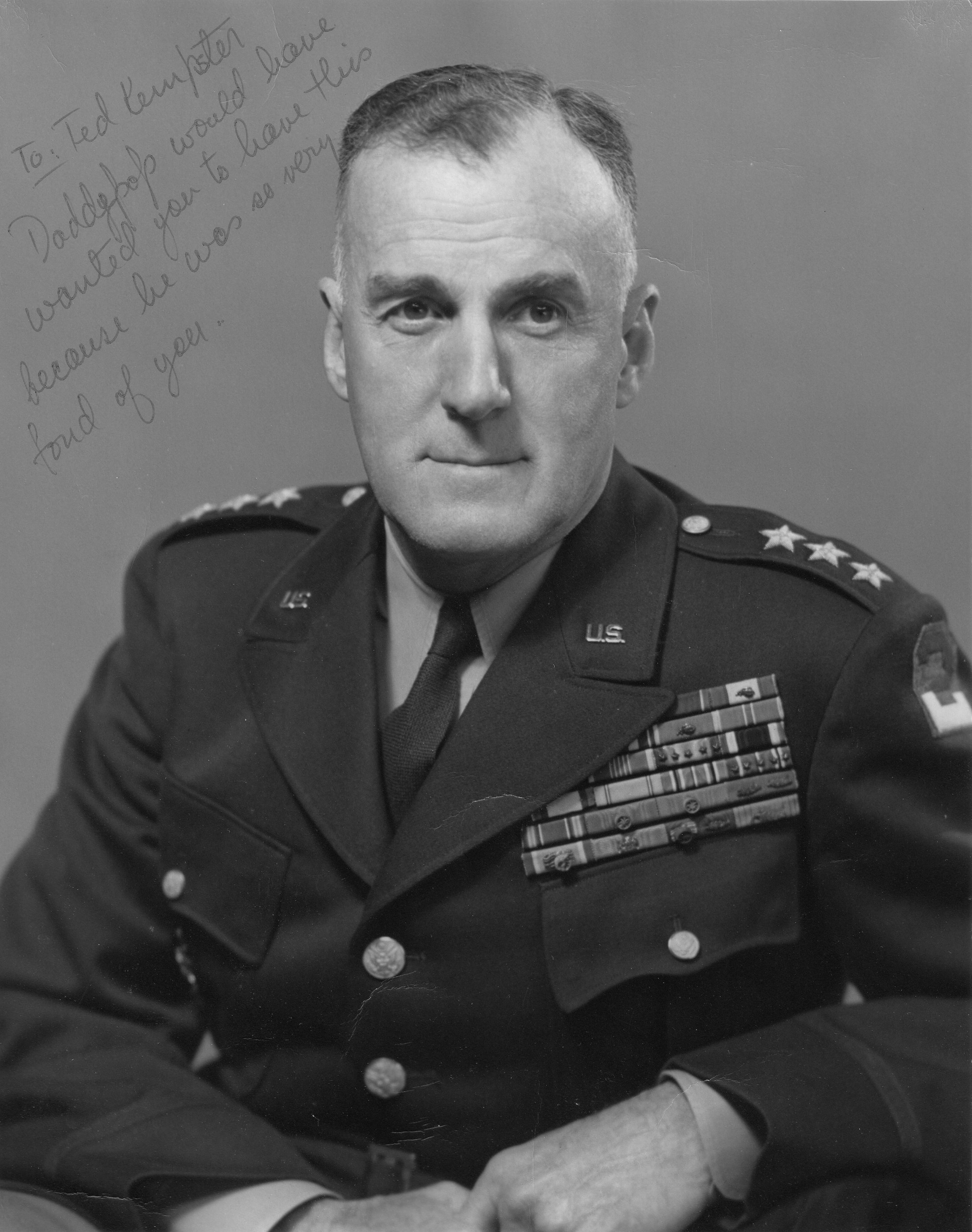
- Born: April 25, 1893; Concord, New Hampshire, U.S.
- Died: October 10, 1978 (aged 85); Concord, New Hampshire, U.S.
- Burial place: Arlington National Cemetery, Virginia, United States
- Relatives: John Kilby Smith (third great-grandfather)
- Military career
- Allegiance: United States
- Branch: United States Army
- Service years: 1917–1953
- Rank: Lieutenant General
- Nicknames: "Ted" "Brooks" "Standing Eddie"
- Service number: 0-6657
- Units: Cavalry Branch; Field Artillery Branch
- Commands: Second Army; United States Army Caribbean; Fourth Service Command; VI Corps; V Corps; 2nd Armored Division; 11th Armored Division
- Conflicts: World War I World War II; Korean War
- Awards: Distinguished Service Cross; Army Distinguished Service Medal (2); Silver Star (2); Legion of Merit (2); Bronze Star
- Other work: Engineering; Banking

Lieutenant General Edward Hale Brooks (April 25, 1893 – October 10, 1978) was a highly decorated senior officer of the United States Army, a combat veteran of both World War I and World War II, who commanded the U.S. Second Army during the Korean War. He received the Distinguished Service Cross (DSC) for heroism as a junior officer in World War I and, remaining in the army during the interwar period, rose to command the 2nd Armored Division during the Battle of Normandy as well as VI Corps during the subsequent defeat of German forces in World War II.

== Early life and military career ==
Edward Hale Brooks was born on April 25, 1893, in Concord, New Hampshire. His father, Edward Waite Brooks, was a Concord grocer. His mother was the former Mary Frances Hale, a native of Dover, Kent, England. Brooks had three sisters, Harriott, Gertrude and Alice Brooks. Both Gertrude and Alice died in their infancy. He graduated from Concord High School in June 1911 (where he lettered in football), after which he attended Norwich University (The Military College of Vermont) in Northfield, Vermont, graduating in 1916 with a Bachelor of Science Degree in Civil Engineering. In 1949, he received the honorary degree of Master of Military Science from Norwich University. In 1952, Brooks was awarded an honorary Doctor of Military Science degree from Pennsylvania Military College.

Brooks began his military career in June 1915 as a captain with the 1st Cavalry Regiment of the Vermont National Guard, a position he held until July 1916. For the following year, he worked as a civil engineer before his National Guard unit was called up for federal service.

On Thanksgiving Day, 1917, Brooks married the former Beatrice Aurora Leavitt. They had two children: Elizabeth Allen Brooks (b. December 27, 1918) and Edward Hale Brooks, Jr. (b. June 6, 1920).

== World War I ==
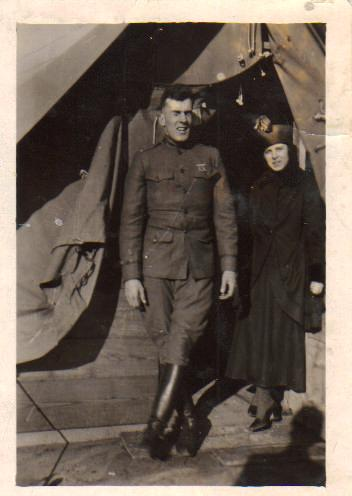
Lieutenant Edward Hale Brooks, pictured here with his wife, Beatrice Brooks, as he prepares to ship off to Europe, 1918.

Brooks was commissioned as a second lieutenant of the Cavalry Branch in the Regular Army of the United States Army in August 1917, four months after the American entry into World War I, was promoted to first lieutenant the same date and was assigned to the Army Service Schools at Fort Leavenworth, Kansas. In November 1917, he was transferred to the 76th Field Artillery Regiment at Camp Shelby, Mississippi, moving with his regiment to Camp Merritt, New Jersey, in March 1918. The regiment was part of the 3rd Division. At that post he was assigned to the 3rd Field Artillery Brigade in command of a detachment (later G-3) that sailed for France to reinforce the American Expeditionary Forces (AEF) in April 1918.

Brooks served on the Western Front in the Champagne-Marne Defense, the Aisne-Marne Offensive, the St. Mihiel Offensive and the Meuse–Argonne offensive, the largest battle in the history of the United States Army. On October 5, 1918, during the fighting in the Meuse–Argonne, he earned a Distinguished Service Cross (DSC), the citation for which reads:

The President of the United States of America, authorized by Act of Congress, July 9, 1918, takes pleasure in presenting the Distinguished Service Cross to Captain (Field Artillery) Edward Hale Brooks (ASN: 0-6657), United States Army, for extraordinary heroism in action while serving with 76th Field Artillery, 3d Division, A.E.F., at Montfaucon, France, 5 October 1918. Captain Brooks exposed himself to heavy and accurate artillery fire directed on an ammunition train while driving a loaded ammunition truck to safety, the driver of which had been killed by the enemy fire. This truck was attached to a burning truck, and the prompt action of Captain Brooks averted a possible explosion which would have caused serious losses.

Following the Armistice with Germany on November 11, 1918, he served with the Army of Occupation in Germany until returning to the United States in August 1919 with station at Camp Pike, Arkansas. In July 1920 he was transferred from the Cavalry Branch to the Field Artillery Branch.

== Between the wars ==
Upon his return to the United States, Brooks was a member of the Camp Pike football team. After being named All-Army Halfback in 1920 on the first All-Army team, he captained the Army team that defeated Great Lakes Naval Training Station 20–6 at the American Legion Convention in Kansas City in 1921.

Brooks entered the U.S. Army Field Artillery School at Fort Sill, Oklahoma, in September 1921. Upon graduation in June 1922 he remained as an instructor in gunnery until November 1926, when he was assigned to the command of Battery 'D' of the 24th Field Artillery Regiment, a pack mule outfit at Fort Stotsenburg, in the Philippines.

In October 1928, he was assigned to the 18th Field Artillery Regiment at Fort Riley, Kansas. At Fort Riley his artillery battery, a horse drawn outfit, was the first to complete a 100-mile forced march in less than 24 hours. From 1932 to 1934 Brooks attended the U.S. Army Command and General Staff School at Fort Leavenworth, Kansas, then went to Harvard University as a Reserve Officers' Training Corps (ROTC) instructor in 1934. He attended the U.S. Army War College from 1936 to 1937 and was then detailed as an instructor in the attack section of the Command and General Staff College.

=== Preparing for World War II ===
Brooks was chief of the statistics branch of the War Department General Staff from 1939 to 1941, where he was closely associated with General George C. Marshall, the U.S. Army Chief of Staff, and Secretary of War Henry L. Stimson. By this time he had risen to the rank of lieutenant colonel, having been promoted on August 1, 1940. In September 1941, Major General Jacob L. Devers requested that Brooks be named to the staff of the new armored force being formed at Fort Knox, Kentucky. With this came a promotion to the one-star general officer rank of brigadier general in the Army of the United States (AUS) on December 15, 1941. Consequently, he never held the rank of colonel. In 1942, shortly after the Japanese attack on Pearl Harbor and the subsequent German declaration of war on the United States in December 1941, which brought America into World War II, he was promoted once again, this time to major general (AUS), on August 5, 1942. In this capacity he played a major role in the development of the M-7 self-propelled artillery piece and the howitzer motor carriage M8, both potent forces in armored tactics.

== World War II ==
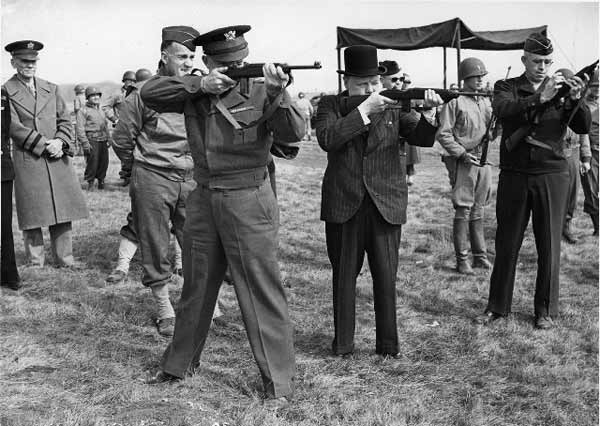
Brooks observing General Dwight D. Eisenhower, Winston Churchill and Lieutenant General Omar Bradley fire M1 carbines.

From August 1942 until March 1944 Brooks served as the first commander of the 11th Armored Division at Fort Knox, Kentucky, preparing them for the impending invasion of continental Europe. His results with the 11th Armored Division caught the eye of senior commanders, resulting in his selection for overseas assignment to command the 2nd "Hell on Wheels" Armored Division, then stationed in England training for the Allied invasion of Normandy.

In January 1943, at the direct request of General Marshall, Brooks, then a two-star major general, and several other senior officers accompanied Lieutenant General Devers on a tour of Northern African Allied forces. Their objective was to assess Allied and Axis strengths and weaknesses and to gather ideas for making armor training more realistic, reflecting actual combat experience. At the conclusion of their North African Theater intelligence gathering, the B-17 they were on ("Stinky") crash-landed in neutral Ireland. They were treated by the locals with hospitality and were transferred across the border to Northern Ireland the next day. Devers and Brooks pressed on to inspect the European Theater of Operations, then technically still under the command of Lt. Gen. Eisenhower. They toured England using the train supplied by Logistics Chief Major General John C. H. Lee, witnessing joint operations with the British, and many Services of Supply installations as well. They flew back to Washington on 28 January.

Major General Brooks assumed command of the 2nd Armored Division on March 17, 1944, at Tidworth Camp, near Salisbury, England. The division had been transferred to England from the Mediterranean late in 1943. After a training and preparation period the division embarked from England in LCI's and LST's on June 8, 1944, and stood toward the shores of France. Preceded by an advance command post detachment which established contact with the V Corps commanding general, Major General Leonard T. Gerow, the division landed on Omaha Beach on June 9, 1944. The 2nd Armored Division was committed immediately. In its first engagement the division secured the Vire River bridgehead.

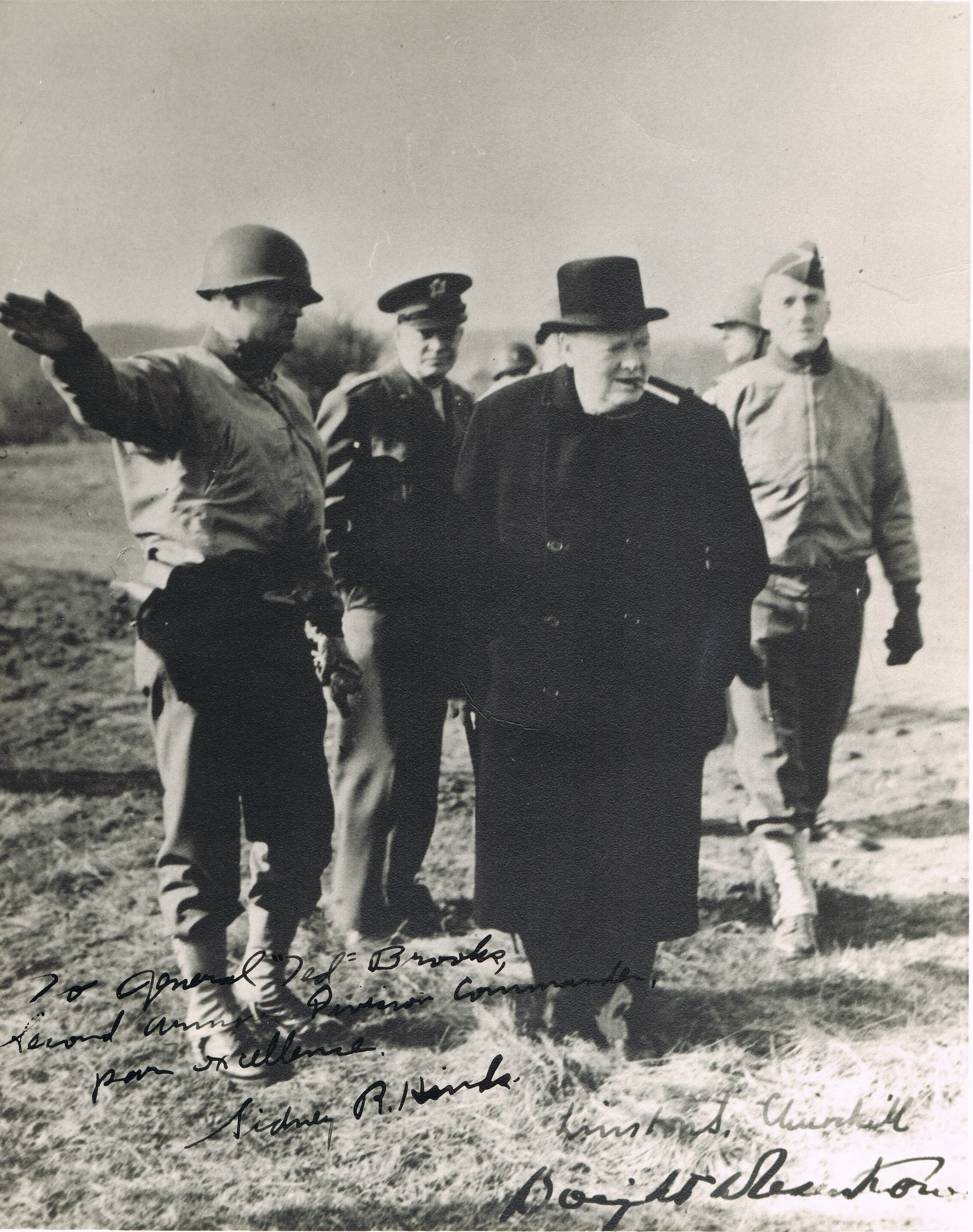
Colonel Sidney Hinds, General Eisenhower, Prime Minister Churchill and Major General Brooks overseeing preparations for D-Day.

Normandy and the bocage country, where hedgerows furnished natural cover for every field came next. The problem was solved by mounting huge bulldozer blades on the tanks so that a path could be cut through the natural earthen breastworks for the infantry to follow. Then came Saint-Lô, the breakthrough at Avranches, where the 2nd Armored Division held the eastern flank, and a series of engagements throughout Northern France and Belgium. Brooks was cited for gallantry in action during the period August 2 to 6 for making repeated visits to forward elements of his command. Exposing himself to hostile observation and fire, he expedited the commitment of the division and personally assisted in the organization of continuing attacks by subordinate units in assault on enemy strong points. That display of gallantry and leadership, without regard to his personal safety, earned for him the Silver Star.

Brooks personally pushed the 2nd Armored Division into being among the first Allied divisions on Belgian soil, and was the first Allied division commander to enter that country by assault. An incident during the drive into Belgium occurred when a corps staff officer came to Brooks' 2nd Armored command post and told the general that he had a mission for the division that he feared was impossible—to be in Ghent in two days. The staff officer's eyes bugged out when the general said, "Tell the corps commander it's in the bag. We'll be there." After the officer departed, Brooks turned to his chief of staff, Colonel Charles D. Palmer, and said, "Where the hell is Ghent?" (They made the objective behind enemy lines and outside their operational zone, with hours to spare.)

From training in England, through the Normandy landings, the hedgerow fighting, the breakthrough and the race northeastward across France, through Belgium to the Albert Canal, Brooks had guided the division through two campaigns and scores of operations. During this period, seven units of his command were awarded the Presidential Distinguished Unit Citation. At Marchiennes, France near the Belgian border on September 2, 1944, he himself had personally participated in and directed an operation which annihilated a German convoy of 165 vehicles and earned him an oak leaf cluster to his Silver Star. The Army Distinguished Service Medal was awarded to Brooks for his leadership of the 2nd Armored Division.

On September 12, 1944, while the 2nd Armored Division was poised at the Albert Canal, Brooks relinquished command of the division to take temporary command of the V Corps. On October 25 Brooks assumed command of the VI Corps under Lieutenant General Alexander Patch's U.S. Seventh Army, replacing Major General Lucian Truscott who was given command of the Fifteenth Army.

Eisenhower's decision to appoint Brooks was by process of elimination because at that point very few other division commanders had been as consistently stellar. He had repeatedly impressed the right people at the right time. Although McNair had initially been concerned with Brooks's inexperience with large formations, by January 1944 he rated Brooks third out of the twelve armored division commanders available for Overlord. Patton listed Brooks as one of four officers he would consider for the Second Armored Division, and Eisenhower put his name at the top of his preferences. Marshall obliged them by dispatching Brooks overseas, and Brooks ably led the Second Armored through the tough fighting in Normandy and the race across France.

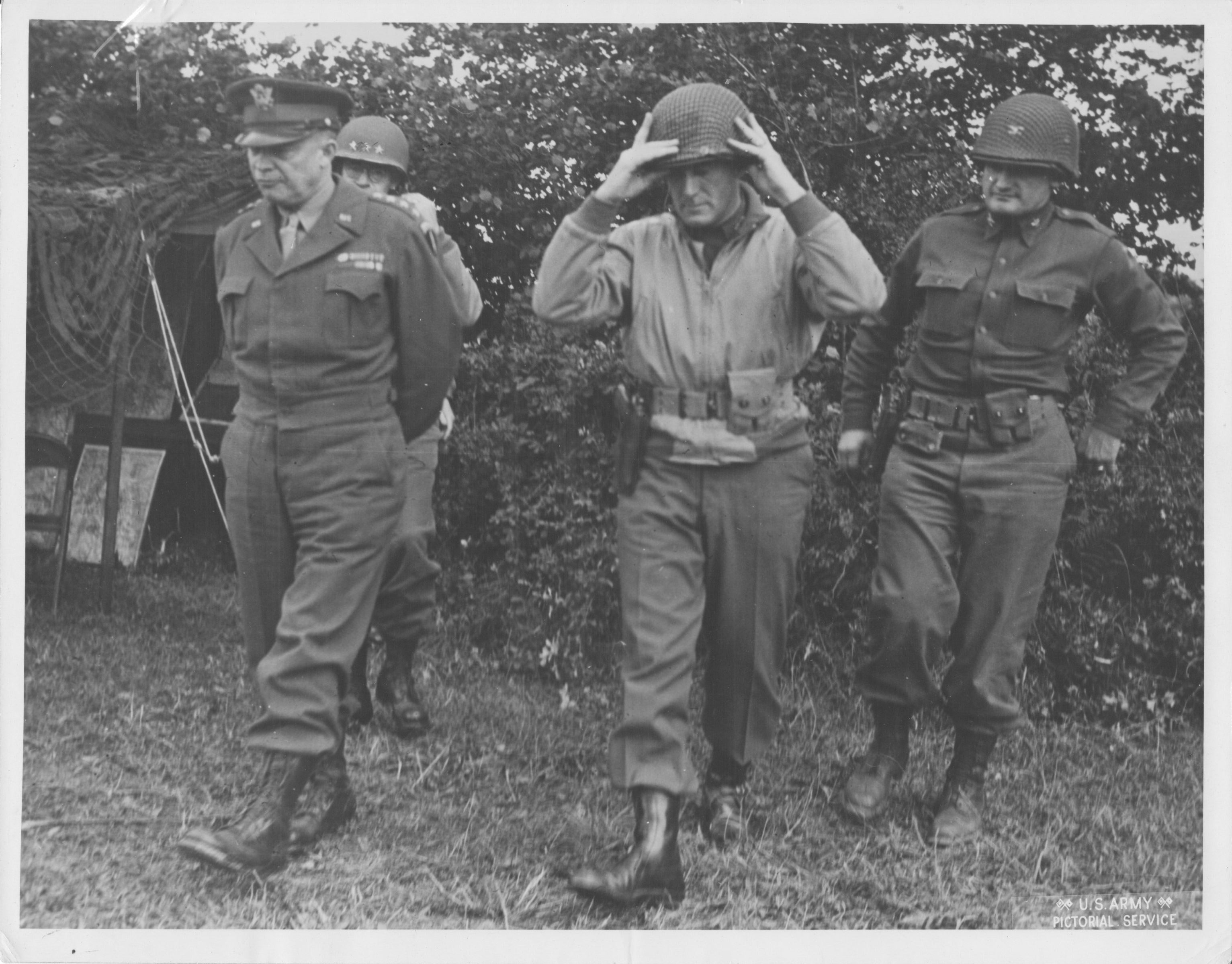
Major General Brooks walking with General Eisenhower, Lieutenant General Bradley and Colonel Palmer.

In early November, VI Corps was confronted with three problems: to bring the corps' right and left flanks up to the salient held by the 3rd Infantry Division along the Meurthe, thus straightening a "jump" line for another offensive; to introduce the newly arrived 100th and 103rd Infantry Divisions into combat, and to make final plans and regroup the entire corps for an attack to cross the Meurthe, to crack the German Winter Line, to penetrate the Vosges passes, and to reach the Rhine. The Seventh Army's assault was marked by success. VI Corps drove through to its objectives. German defenses of the Vosges passes were taken, Strasbourg was captured and the River Rhine reached.

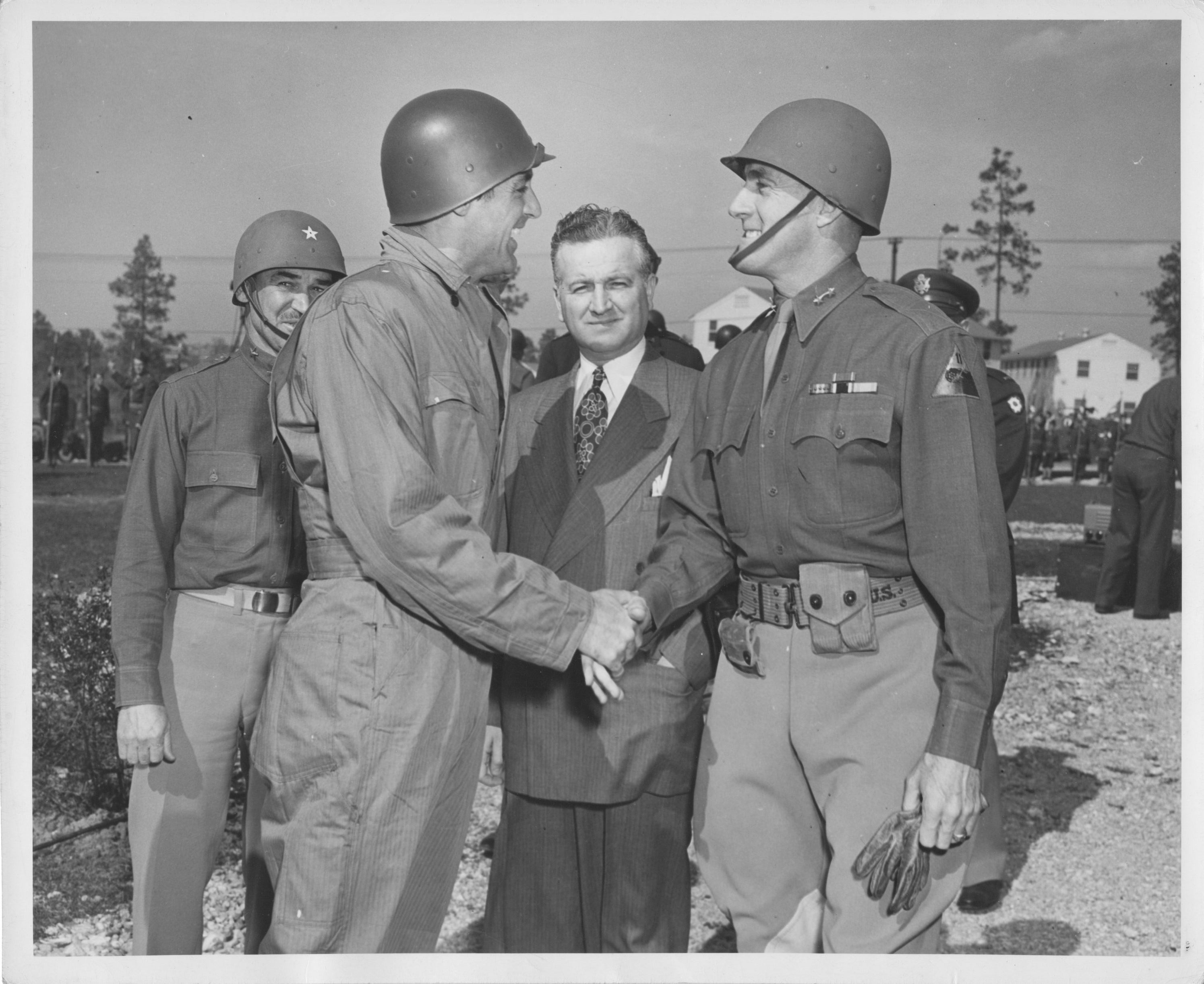
Brooks greeting actor Cary Grant.

The army changed its direction of attack on November 24. This resulted in major disengagements, reliefs and redeployments. All were accomplished by December 5. VI Corps, teamed with XV Corps, was ready to attack to the north—objective the Lauter River and invasion of Germany. Hurdles ahead were the Maginot Line, the Haguenau Forest and the Siegfried Line. By mid-December the VI Corps was crossing the Lauter River into Germany and assaulting the Siegfried Line.

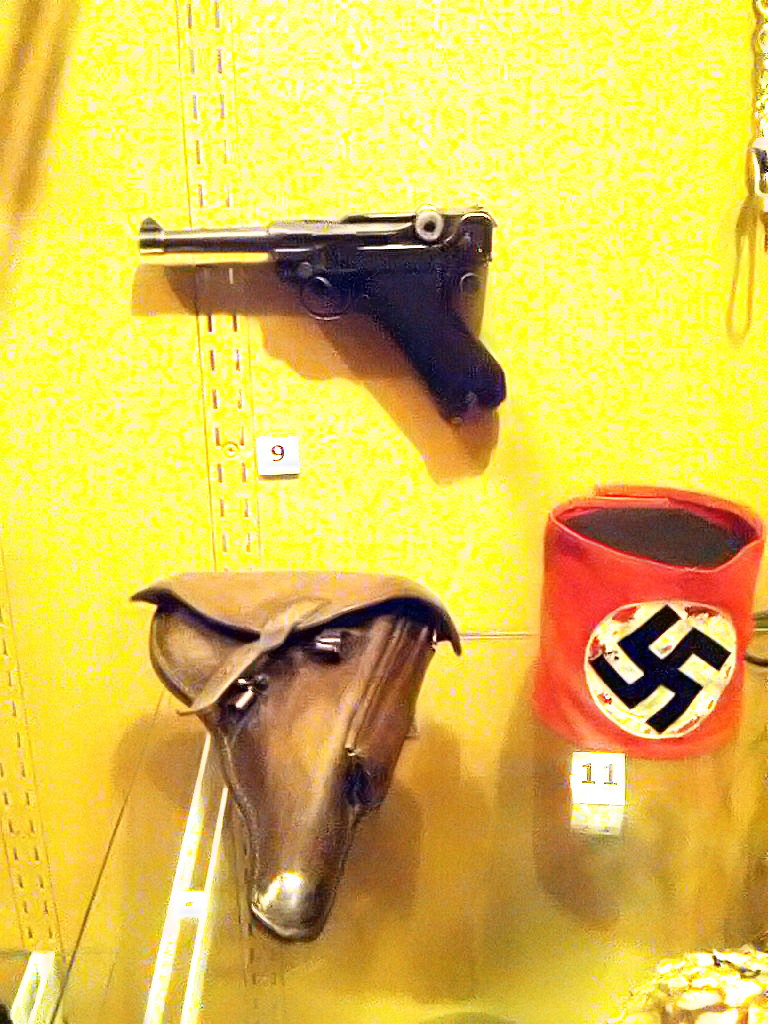
Luger pistol surrendered by General der Panzertruppe Erich Brandenberger to Major General Brooks, along with the German 19th and 24th Armies, on May 5, 1945, in Innsbruck, Austria. Currently in the collection of the Sullivan Museum and History Center, Norwich University.

On the night of December 20 the Seventh Army's offensive was called off and all troops ordered to prepare defensive lines. This resulted from the apparent success of the German counter-offensive in Belgium and Luxembourg, known as the "Battle of the Bulge." Forced on the defensive by this turn of events and in the face of determined and repeated enemy counterattacks Brooks organized a flexible defense which stopped the enemy attacks. During VI Corps' resistance to a January 1, 1945, enemy counterattack through the Low Vosges Mountains (Operation Nordwind), VI Corps executed a difficult withdrawal from close contact with the enemy to a predetermined line along the Moder River. All hostile attacks against that position were repulsed. All was quiet on the corps' front until March. For his performance in command of the VI Corps, from December 5, 1944, to March 1945, Brooks was awarded an oak-leaf cluster to the Army Distinguished Service Medal. While VI Corps was criticized for exposing its armored forces in towns, Devers noted that "Ted Brooks has fought one of the great defensive battles of all time with very little."

General Eisenhower discusses the war situation with some of his senior commanders at a forward command post, November 1944. From left to right: Lieutenant General Alexander Patch, Major General Edward H. Brooks]l, Lieutenant General Jacob L. Devers, General Eisenhower, and Lieutenant General Omar Bradley.

The great spring offensive began in March. VI Corps crossed the Rhine and captured Heidelberg. then came Heilbronn. Turning south and crossing the Danube, the corps drove on to the Italian border to meet the U.S. Fifth Army via Brenner Pass.

On May 5, 1945 (two days before Victory in Europe Day) Brooks accepted the surrender of the German 19th Army and 24th Army from General der Panzertruppe Erich Brandenberger in Innsbruck, Austria, thus terminating hostilities in his sector more than 24 hours before the general surrender in Germany and the end of World War II in Europe.

== Personal tragedy ==
On September 22, 1945, Brooks' son, Major Edward Hale Brooks Jr. (USMA Jan 1943), died in a B-17 crash in Belgium while returning from a night training flight.

== After World War II ==
Upon return to the United States at the close of the European war, General Brooks assumed command of the Fourth Service Command at Atlanta, Georgia. He was appointed deputy commander of the Seventh Army at Atlanta in June 1946, and the following March became deputy commander of the Third Army there. He assumed command of the Antilles Department at Fort Brooke, San Juan, Puerto Rico, in September 1947 and, two months later, was designated Commanding General United States Army Caribbean, with station at Quarry Heights, Panama Canal Zone. On 24 July 1948, he was awarded the Chilean Grand Cross of the Star of Military Merit, 1st Class, for his long service in their national defense.

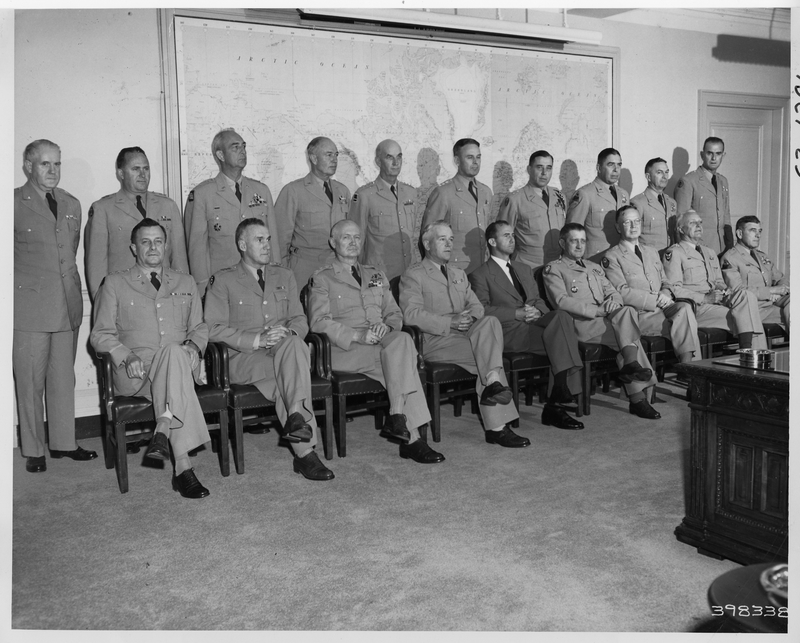
Army commanders in the United States and certain overseas commanders meet with Secretary of the Army Frank Pace and General J. Lawton Collins, Army Chief of Staff, in the Pentagon in routine sessions, June 5, 1952. Lieutenant General Edward H. Brooks is sat second from the left, between Lieutenant General Charles L. Bolte (left) and Lieutenant General Willis D. Crittenberger (right).

In November 1948 Brooks was named Assistant Chief of Staff for Personnel (G-1) of the Army and in March 1949 promoted to the three-star rank of lieutenant general. He then served as commanding general of the U.S. Second Army at Fort Meade, Maryland, from June 1951 until he retired from active service on April 30, 1953.

The following was written of Brooks at the time of his retirement by General Jacob L. Devers: "Ted Brooks is a man of action. He accepts responsibility and then does something constructive about it—and he does it now, not tomorrow. He is a great fighter to have on your side, for he thinks only of the big objective and never of himself. He is quick and sound in his thinking—has tremendous courage—and will tackle any problem with new approaches until he gets the solution. His integrity is of the highest order, and he has great loyalty up and down. He knows when and where to disperse the work load, and when and where to concentrate it. His judgment is unquestionably sound. In addition, Ted has a wonderfully pleasing and dynamic personality. God has truly endowed him with wisdom and with an unfailing ability to understand his fellow man. A great soldier, a keen strategist, and a thoroughly capable administrator, Ted Brooks has all the qualities that would make him an excellent Chief of Staff of the Army."

== Dates of rank ==
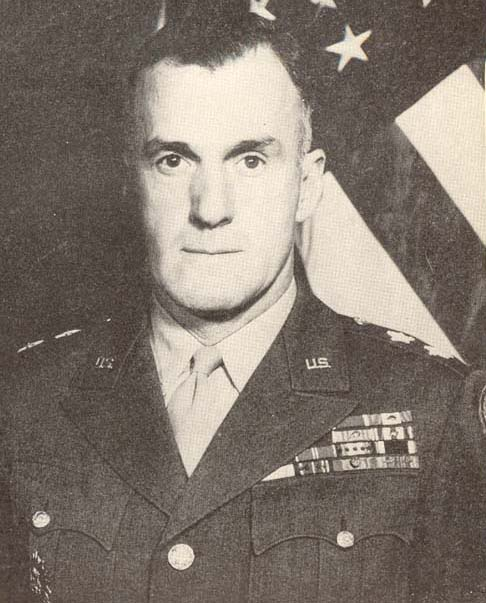
Brooks as a major general

Insignia	Rank	Date	Component
	Captain	June 1915	Vermont National Guard
	Second Lieutenant	8 August 1917	Regular Army
	First Lieutenant	8 August 1917	Regular Army
	Captain	8 June 1918	Regular Army
	Major	1 August 1935	Regular Army
	Lieutenant Colonel	8 August 1940	Regular Army
	Brigadier General	15 December 1941	Regular Army
	Major General	5 August 1942	Regular Army
	Lieutenant General	18 March 1949	Regular Army

== Awards and decorations ==

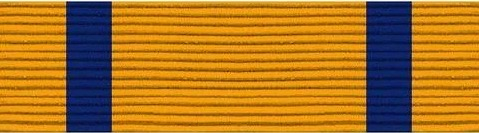
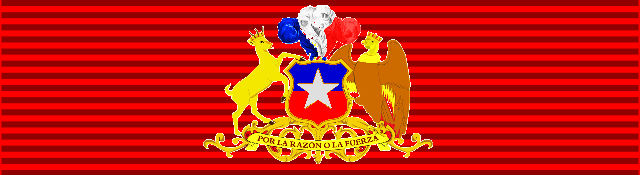

1st row	Distinguished Service Cross	Distinguished Service Medal with oak leaf cluster	Silver Star with oak leaf cluster	Legion of Merit with oak leaf cluster
2nd row	Bronze Star	Army Commendation Medal	World War I Victory Medal with 5 battle clasps	Army of Occupation of Germany Medal
3rd row	American Defense Service Medal	American Campaign Medal	European-African-Middle Eastern Campaign Medal with 5 service stars	World War II Victory Medal
4th row	National Defense Service Medal, awarded as per DD-214, but never worn in ribbon rack	Gran Cruz de la Fundación Internacional Eloy Alfaro	French Légion d'Honneur, rank of Officer	Belgian Order of the Crown, Class of Commander, with Palm
5th row	Netherlands Order of Orange-Nassau with Swords, rank of Grand Officer	Chilean Grand Cross of the Star of Military Merit, 1st Class	French Croix de Guerre, with Palm, 1939–1945	Belgian Croix de guerre, with Palm, 1939–1945

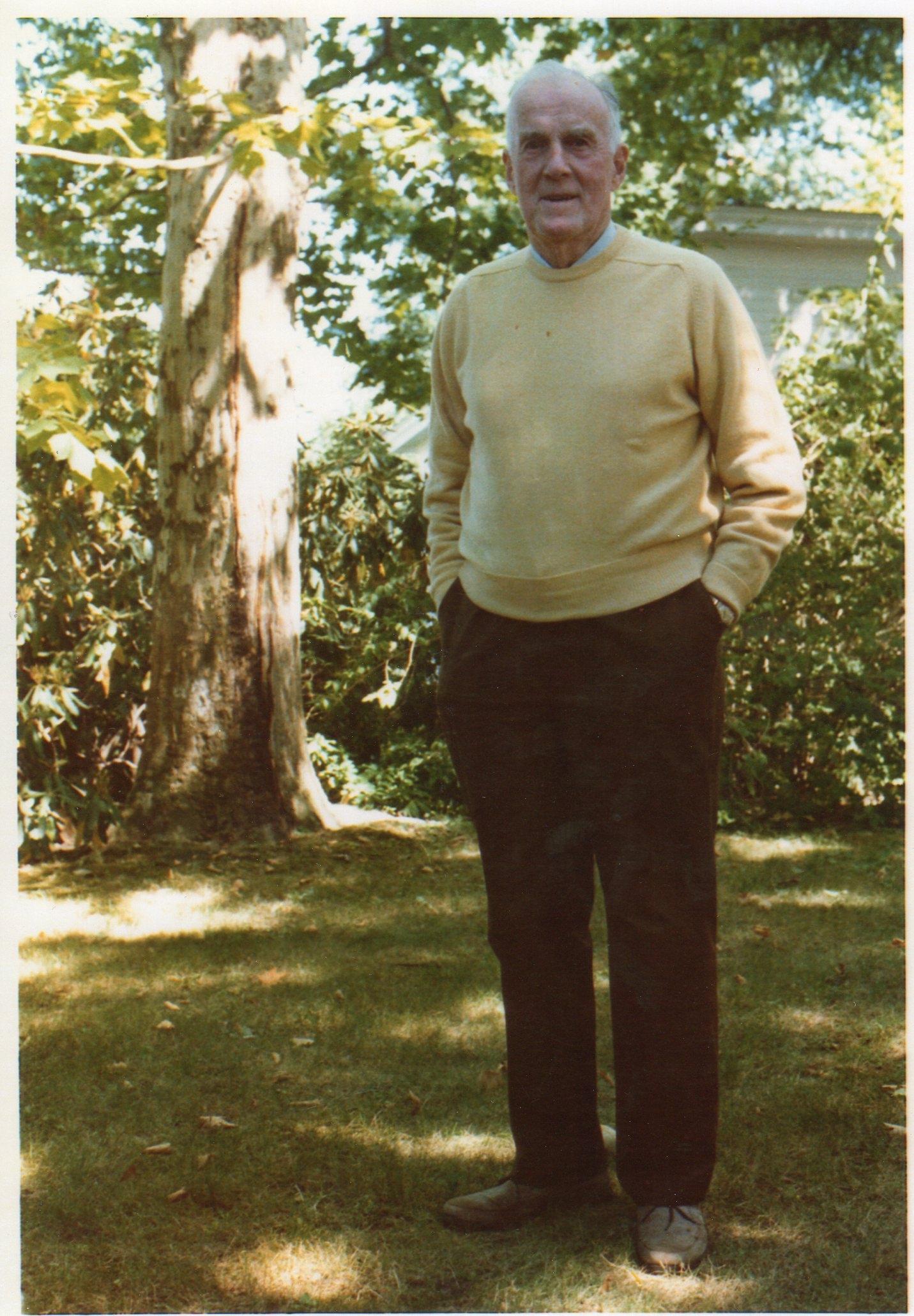
Brooks in retirement.

== Civilian life ==
Brooks spent the rest of his years in Concord and Melvin Village, New Hampshire. He was executive director, Association of Military Colleges and Schools from 1953 to 1964, served on the board of directors of a local bank, was a founding member of the Association of the United States Army, and indulged his love of fly-fishing and his family, among other hobbies.

== Death ==
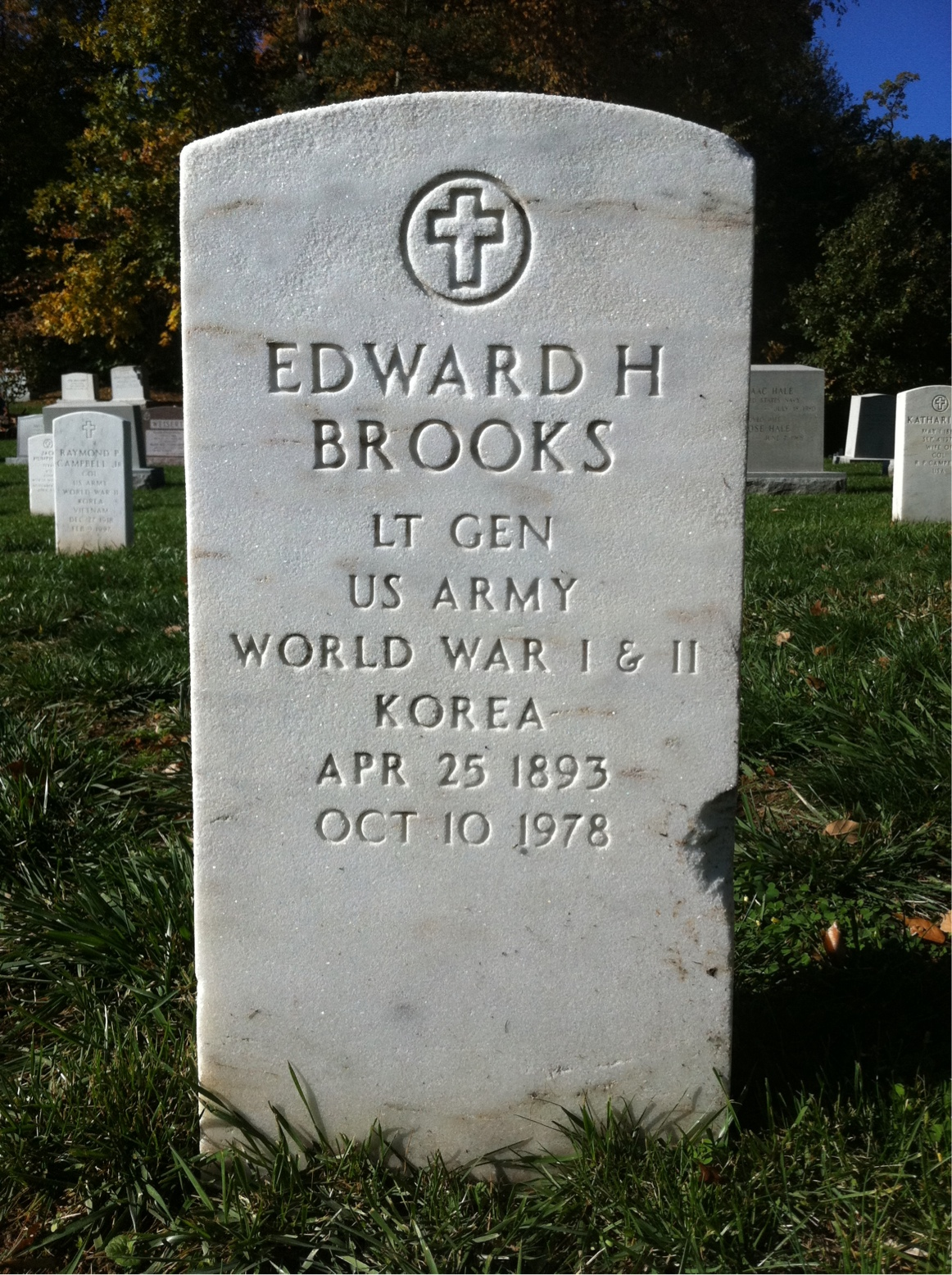
The grave of Lieutenant General Edward H. Brooks at Arlington National Cemetery.

Lieutenant General Edward Hale Brooks died in Concord, NH on October 10, 1978, leaving his wife of 61 years, Beatrice Leavitt Brooks, their daughter, Elizabeth Brooks Campbell, four grandchildren and six great-grandchildren.

Eulogizing Brooks, General Charles D. Palmer said: "He was an exceptional and courageous leader who inspired confidence, demanded much of his subordinates but gave more of himself, was very strict but fair, never sought personal power and glory. He pushed forward deserving subordinates, but never pushed forward himself, was very modest and very human. Subordinates sometimes referred to him as a "lucky general" not meaning that he himself was lucky but that he was lucky for them — such was their confidence that he and they would succeed."

== Notes ==
Brooks was known as "Standing Eddie" for his unusual habit of standing up in his jeep as he reviewed the troops so he could better see them. He had a special railing welded into his jeep to hold onto for this purpose. He once hiked 20 miles himself in full pack in order to set a reasonable time in which to expect his troops to complete it.

== Bibliography ==
- Taaffe, Stephen R. (2013). Marshall and His Generals: U.S. Army Commanders in World War II. Lawrence, Kansas: University Press of Kansas. ISBN 978-0-7006-1942-9. OCLC 840162019.

Military offices
Preceded by Newly activated organization	Commanding General 11th Armored Division; 1942–1944	Succeeded by Charles S. Kilburn
Preceded by Hugh Gaffey	Commanding General 2nd Armored Division; April–September 1944	Succeeded by Ernest N. Harmon
Preceded by Lucian Truscott	Commanding General VI Corps; 1944–1945	Succeeded by William Morris
Preceded by James Van Fleet	Commanding General Second Army; 1951–1953	Succeeded by Leslie D. Carter
