= Orren R. Whiddon =

United States Army general

Orren Ray "Cotton" Whiddon
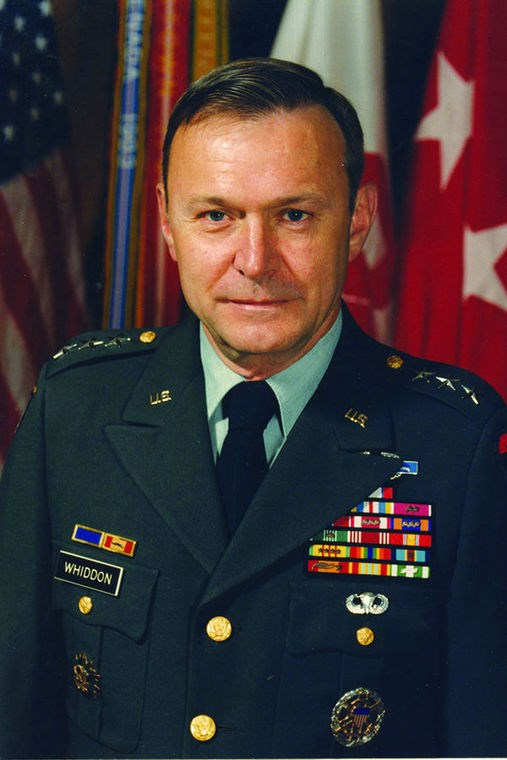
- Born: March 10, 1935; Joaquin, Texas, U.S.
- Died: March 20, 2016 (aged 81); Lufkin, Texas, U.S.
- Military career
- Allegiance: United States
- Branch: United States Army
- Service years: c.1950s–1989
- Rank: Lieutenant general
- Nickname: Cotton

Orren Ray Whiddon (March 10, 1935 – March 20, 2016) was a lieutenant general in the United States Army. He served as commanding general of the 8th Infantry Division from 1985 to 1987, and as commanding general of the Second United States Army from 1987 until being succeeded by James W. Crysel in 1990. He attended Stephen F. Austin State University (1955), where he is a member of their alumni hall of fame. His awards include the Bronze Star, Meritorious Service, Defense Superior Service and Army Commendation medals. He died in 2016.
