= Office of Inspector General of the United States Department of Defense =

Government official

- The Seal of the Inspector General

Federal agency overview
- Formed: 1982
- Type: General nature Civilian agency
- Headquarters: Alexandria, Virginia
- Employees: Approximately 1600 (2011)
- Federal agency executive: Platte Moring, Inspector General
- Parent Federal agency: United States Department of Defense
- Website: www.dodig.mil

The Office of Inspector General of the United States Department of Defense (also known as Office of Inspector General of the United States Department of War) (DoD OIG or DoW OIG) is the internal oversight office for the United States Department of Defense. It provides oversight related to the programs and operations of the department. The office was created in 1982 as an amendment to the Inspector General Act of 1978.

== Background ==
The Department of Defense Inspector General was established in 1982. The mission of DoD IG; as established by the Inspector General Act of 1978, as amended, (5 U.S.C. Appendix); and implemented by DoD Directive 5106.01, "Inspector General of the Department of Defense", is to serve as an independent and objective office in DoD to:

- Conduct, supervise, monitor, and initiate audits, evaluations, and investigations relating to programs and operations of the Department of Defense.
- Provide leadership and coordination and recommend policies for activities designed to promote economy, efficiency, and effectiveness in the administration of, and to prevent and detect fraud and abuse in, such programs and operations.
- Provide a means for keeping the secretary of defense and the Congress fully and currently informed about problems and deficiencies relating to the administration of such programs and operations and the necessity for and progress of corrective action.
- Promote national security by conducting objective and independent audits, investigations, and other activities to prevent, detect and rectify problems in DoD programs and operations, and to identify opportunities for improving efficiency and effectiveness.

== Functions and responsibilities ==
The inspector general acts as the principal advisor to the secretary of defense in matters of Department fraud, waste, and abuse. DoD IG combats fraud, waste and abuse in the Department of Defense by conducting audits and investigations. In addition, the inspector general ensures that the secretary of defense and the Congress are fully informed of problems in the department. Other responsibilities of DoD IG include:

- Providing policy direction for and to conduct, supervise, and coordinate audits and investigations relating to the programs and operations of the department.
- Reviewing existing and proposed legislation and regulations relating to programs and operations of the department in regard to their impact on economy and efficiency and the prevention and detection of fraud and abuse in DoD.
- Recommending policies for, and to conduct, supervise, or coordinate other activities for the purpose of promoting economy and efficiency in the administration of, or preventing and detecting fraud and abuse in DoD programs and operations.
- Coordinating relationships with federal agencies, state and local government agencies and non-governmental entities in matters relating to promotion of economy and detection of fraud and abuse.
- Transmitting a Semiannual Report to the Congress that is available to the public.

DoD IG is authorized “to have access to all records, reports, audits, reviews, documents, papers, recommendations, or other material available to [any DoD component] which relate to programs and operations [of the Department of Defense]”. (IG Act 6.a.1). The inspector general may issue subpoenas for the production of documents, reports, answers, records, accounts, papers, and other data or documentary evidence necessary in the performance of the functions assigned to DoD IG by the IG Act (IG Act 6.a.1). Additionally, DoD IG has been given the authority to require testimony from any witness who is not currently a federal employee (IG Act 8.i).

== Organization ==
=== Administrative Investigations ===
Administrative Investigations oversees DoD Component allegations of misconduct by senior DoD officials, and allegations of whistleblower reprisal and restriction from communication with an IG or Member of Congress. IG also provides a confidential DoD Hotline for reporting fraud, waste, and abuse and for detecting and preventing threats and danger to the public health and safety of the DoD.

=== Audit ===
Audit provides independent, relevant, and timely audits that promote economy, efficiency, and effectiveness, and include actionable recommendations that, when effectively implemented, help improve DoD programs, operations, and stewardship of its resources.

=== Defense Criminal Investigative Service ===
Defense Criminal Investigative Service conducts criminal investigations of matters related to DoD programs and operations, focusing on procurement fraud, public corruption, product substitution, health care fraud, illegal technology transfer, and cyber crimes and computer intrusions.

=== Evaluations ===
Evaluations provides independent, relevant, and timely evaluations that promote economy, efficiency, and effectiveness, and include actionable recommendations that, when effectively implemented, help improve DoD programs, operations, and stewardship of its resources.

=== Overseas Contingency Operations ===
Overseas Contingency Operations supports the DoD OIG's lead IG responsibilities, coordinates the oversight of overseas contingency operations by the DoD OIG and other agencies through joint strategic planning and project management, and produces quarterly reports related to each overseas contingency operation.

== Independence ==
The inspector general is nominated by the president and confirmed by the Senate. An inspector general may only be removed by the president, who must notify the Congress of the reasons for such a removal. The inspector general has independent authority within the department to initiate and conduct audits, investigations, and special assessments in areas involving the programs and operations of the department.

The inspector general has authority to “have direct and prompt access” to the secretary of defense “for any purpose pertaining to the performance of the functions and responsibilities” of the inspector general (IG Act 6.a.6). The inspector general has the authority to “select, appoint, and employ such officers and employees as may be necessary” (IG Act 6.a.7), “directly contract for program services” (IG Act 6.a.9) and “maintain legal counsel who report directly to the Inspector General” (IG Act 3.g).

The secretary of defense may prohibit the inspector general from initiating, carrying out, or completing an audit or investigation, or from issuing a subpoena if the secretary determines that each prohibition is necessary to preserve the national security interests of the United States. Exercise of such power requires notification to Congress within thirty days to include a statement of the reasons for the exercise of such power (IG Act 8).

== Oversight planning ==
DoD IG receives requests from Congress, the department and the public. In addition to these sources, DoD IG plans projects based on areas critical to the management challenges of the department, which are published in the Department of Defense Agency Financial Report.

Each component develops an annual plan that considers:

- Legislative mandates
- IG priorities
- Requests from Congress
- Requests from DoD senior leadership
- Defense Hotline complaints

== Working with Congress ==
Section 2(3) of the Inspector General Act requires the inspector general to keep Congress fully and currently informed about problems and deficiencies relating to the administration of DoD programs and operations and the necessity for and progress of corrective action.

Section 4(a) of the Inspector General Act requires the inspector general “to review existing and proposed legislation and regulations relating to the programs and operations of [the Department of Defense]” and to make recommendations “concerning the impact of such legislation or regulations on the economy and efficiency in the administration of programs and operations administered or financed by [the department] or the prevention and detection of fraud and abuse in such programs and operations”.

In addition, the inspector general testifies before committees of Congress including the Senate Armed Services Committee, House Armed Services Committee, the Senate and House Appropriations Committees, the Senate Committee on Homeland Security and Government Affairs, and the House Oversight Committee. DoD IG audits, inspections, and investigations support the Congress in its oversight of the Department of Defense. In addition, DoD IG meets regularly with members and staff to brief them on IG findings and activities.

== Defense Hotline ==
=== About the Defense Hotline ===
The Defense Hotline provides a confidential means of reporting instances of fraud, waste, abuse of authority, and mismanagement. DoD IG manages the Defense Hotline. Complaints received by the Defense Hotline are referred to the appropriate inspector general, defense agency, or investigative agency for inquiry or investigation. Defense Hotline staff work closely with the inspectors general of the military services and defense agencies to ensure that complaints are efficiently and effectively investigated and reported.

The Defense Hotline is staffed by professional investigators knowledgeable in military and civilian policies, procedures and regulations; defense contracting procedures; and provisions of agency ethics regulations.

== History of inspectors general ==
Personal flag of the office holder of the inspector general for the US Department of Defense

Inspectors General of the U.S. Defense Department
Inspectors general	Senate confirmation	Sworn in	Departure
Joseph H. Sherick	April 28, 1983	May 20, 1983	June 3, 1986
Derek J. Vander Schaaf (acting) (Note: Vander Schaaf served before the Federal Vacancies Reform Act of 1998 and retained the title of deputy while serving as the interim head of agency.)	N/A	June 4, 1986	November 13, 1987
June Gibbs Brown	November 13, 1987	November 13, 1987	October 20, 1989
Derek J. Vander Schaaf (acting)	N/A	October 21, 1989	November 27, 1989
Susan Crawford	November 22, 1989	November 28, 1989	November 19, 1991
Derek J. Vander Schaaf (acting)	N/A	November 20, 1991	February 28, 1995
Eleanor Hill	February 23, 1995	March 1, 1995	April 30, 1999
Donald Mancuso (acting)	N/A	May 1, 1999	January 3, 2001
Robert Lieberman (acting)	N/A	January 4, 2001	April 1, 2002
Joseph E. Schmitz	March 21, 2002	April 2, 2002	September 9, 2005
Thomas F. Gimble (acting)	N/A	September 10, 2005	April 29, 2007
Claude M. Kicklighter	April 12, 2007	April 30, 2007	July 13, 2008
Gordon S. Heddell (acting) (Note: Mr. Heddell served as the DoD Acting Inspector General while still serving as the Department of Labor Inspector General.)	N/A	July 14, 2008	July 13, 2009
Gordon S. Heddell	July 10, 2009	July 14, 2009	December 23, 2011
Lynne Hallbrooks (acting)	N/A	December 23, 2011	September 17, 2013
Jon T. Rymer	September 17, 2013	September 25, 2013	January 9, 2016
Glenn A. Fine (acting)	N/A	January 10, 2016	April 6, 2020
Sean O'Donnell (acting)	N/A	April 6, 2020	December 6, 2022
Robert Storch	November 30, 2022	December 6, 2022	January 24, 2025
Steven A. Stebbins (acting)	N/A	January 24, 2025	December 22, 2025
Platte Moring	December 18, 2025	December 22, 2025	Present

== Oversight community ==
=== Council of Inspectors General on Integrity and Efficiency ===
The Council of Inspectors General on Integrity and Efficiency (CIGIE) includes 73 statutory inspectors general of a number of large governmental agencies as well as smaller independent agencies. The Inspector General Act of 1978, amended by the IG Reform Act of 2008, established the CIGIE that consists of seven committees: Audit, Human Resources, Information Technology, Inspection and Evaluation, Investigations, Integrity, and Legislation. The CIGIE addresses integrity, economy, and effectiveness issues that transcend individual government agencies; and increases the professionalism and effectiveness of personnel. The CIGIE develops policies, standards, and approaches to aid in the establishment of a well-trained and highly skilled workforce. DoD IG is an active participant in the CIGIE, serving as a member of the CIGIE Executive Council; as chair of the CIGIE Information Technology Committee; and as editor-in-chief of the Journal of Public Inquiry.

=== Defense Council on Integrity and Efficiency ===
The Defense Council on Integrity and Efficiency is patterned after the Council of Inspectors General on Integrity and Efficiency. The DCIE is chaired by the inspector general and meets on a quarterly basis to discuss issues of common interest, share information and best practices, and build closer working relationships among members of the oversight community within the department.

== See also ==
- Department of Defense Whistleblower Program
- Office of the Inspector General of the United States Army
- Naval Inspector General
- Inspector General of the Department of the Air Force
- Inspector General
