= Office of Terrorism and Financial Intelligence =

United States government agency

- Seal of the United States Department of the Treasury

Agency overview
- Jurisdiction: Executive branch of the United States
- Employees: 1000
- Parent department: U.S. Department of the Treasury
- Website: https://home.treasury.gov/about/offices/terrorism-and-financial-intelligence

The Office of Terrorism and Financial Intelligence (TFI), formed in 2004, is an agency of the United States Department of the Treasury. TFI works to protect the U.S. financial system from misuse by terrorists, money launderers, drug cartels, and other national security threats.

TFI is headed by the Under Secretary of the Treasury for Terrorism and Financial Intelligence who is appointed by the president and confirmed by the Senate. The position was vacant after the departure of Sigal Mandelker in October 2019. In December 2021, Brian E. Nelson was confirmed by the Senate in a 50-49 vote as the next Under Secretary.

TFI oversees the Office of Terrorist Financing and Financial Crimes, the Office of Intelligence and Analysis, the Office of Foreign Assets Control, the Financial Crimes Enforcement Network and the Treasury Executive Office for Asset Forfeiture.

The U.S. Treasury Department is the only national finance ministry with its own in-house intelligence agency, with offices around the world, including Islamabad and Abu Dhabi.

== History ==
TFI was founded in 2004. Its first Under Secretary was Stuart A. Levey who was sworn in on July 21, 2004. He was a political appointee of President George W. Bush and President Obama asked Levey to remain in the position. Levey served until March 2011 and was succeeded by David S. Cohen on June 30, 2011. He left the position on February 9, 2015, and was succeeded by Adam J. Szubin who served from April 16, 2015, to February 13, 2017. Sigal Mandelker was nominated for the position by President Donald Trump in March 2017 and confirmed by the Senate on June 21, 2017. The position was vacant after Mandelker's departure in October 2019.

On May 26, 2021, President Joe Biden nominated Nelson to serve as Under Secretary of the Treasury for Terrorism and Financial Intelligence. On June 22, 2021, the Senate Banking Committee held hearings on Nelson's nomination. The committee deadlocked on his nomination on October 5, 2021, in a party-line vote. The entire Senate discharged his nomination from the committee on October 19, 2021, in a 50-49 vote. On December 2, 2021, Nelson was confirmed by the Senate in a 50-49 vote.

The Secretary, acting through the Terrorism and Financial Intelligence Office of the Department of the Treasury, shall deploy investigative tools, examine financial flows, and coordinate with partner agencies to trace illicit funding streams.

— NSPM-7
