= Bayt al-Mal (Hezbollah) =

Hezbollah Bayt al-Mal, also known as Hezbollah Bayt al-Mal Lil Muslimeen or Unit 141, is a Hezbollah-controlled organization that performs financial services for the organization serving as Hezbollah’s unofficial “treasury” as it holds and invests in assets.

Bayt al-Mal operates under the direct supervision of Hezbollah Secretary General Naim Qassem. As Hezbollah's main financial body, Bayt al-Mal serves as a bank, creditor, and investment arm for Hezbollah. Husayn al-Shami is the head of Bayt al-Mal.

It has branch offices in: Harat Hurayk, Beirut, Lebanon; Burj Al-Barajinah, Lebanon; Sidon, Lebanon; Tyre, Lebanon; Al-Nabatiyah, Lebanon; Ba'albak, Lebanon; and Hirmil, Lebanon.

Hezbollah Bayt al-Mal utilizes the Yousser Company for Finance and Investment to secure loans and finance business deals for Hezbollah companies.

According to Mr. Stuart Levey, U.S. Department of Treasury's Under Secretary for Terrorism and Financial Intelligence (TFI),"Bayt al-Mal functions as Hezbollah's unofficial treasury, holding and investing its assets and serving as intermediaries between the terrorist group and mainstream banks."

The central headquarters of Bayt al-Mal was located in Hezbollah's stronghold in Beirut's southern suburbs.
