= Office of Intelligence and Analysis =

The Office of Intelligence and Analysis may refer to:

- DHS Office of Intelligence and Analysis - an office of the United States Department of Homeland Security
- Office of Intelligence and Analysis (United States Department of the Treasury) - an office of the United States Department of the Treasury
