= Jimmy Gurulé =

American attorney and government official

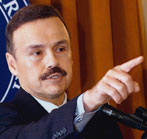

United States Under Secretary of the Treasury for Enforcement
- In office 2001–2003
- President: George W. Bush
- Preceded by: Jim Johnson
- Succeeded by: Stuart A. Levey

United States Assistant Attorney General for the Office of Justice Programs
- In office 1990–1992
- President: George H. W. Bush

Personal details
- Born: Salt Lake City, Utah, U.S.
- Party: Republican (until 2021); Independent (since 2021)
- Spouse: Julia
- Children: 3
- Education: University of Utah (BA, JD)

Jimmy Gurulé is an American attorney, academic and government official, who is a professor at Notre Dame Law School, teaching criminal law courses. He was the first Hispanic Assistant Attorney General in the United States.

== Biography ==
Gurulé was nominated by President George W. Bush and confirmed unanimously by the United States Senate as the United States Department of the Treasury's Under Secretary of the Treasury for Terrorism and Financial Intelligence, serving from 2001 until 2003. As Under Secretary for Enforcement, Gurulé provided oversight, policy guidance, and support to the Treasury law enforcement components: the Bureau of Alcohol, Tobacco and Firearms; the U.S. Customs Service; the Federal Law Enforcement Training Center; the Financial Crimes Enforcement Network; the U.S. Secret Service; the Executive Office for Asset Forfeiture; and the Office of Foreign Assets Control. Gurulé also provided enforcement policy guidance to the Internal Revenue Service's Criminal Investigation.

Gurulé began his career as a trial attorney with the United States Department of Justice in Washington D.C. He subsequently held the following positions: Deputy County Attorney in the Salt Lake City Attorney's Office; Assistant U.S. Attorney and Deputy Chief of the Major Narcotics Section of the Los Angeles branch of the U.S. Attorney's Office; and Assistant Attorney General, appointed by President George H. W. Bush, in charge of the Department of Justice's Office of Justice Programs in Washington D.C.

Gurulé was one of dozens of Bush administration Republicans who said in February 2021 they were leaving the GOP, citing its failure to disown Donald Trump for his attempts to overturn the 2020 presidential election that allegedly culminated in the violent storming of the United States Capitol, stating, "The Republican Party as I knew it no longer exists. I’d call it the cult of Trump."

He is also the author of several books on terrorist financing and counter-terrorism strategy.
