= Office of Intelligence and Analysis (United States Department of the Treasury) =

Agency of the United States Department of the Treasury

- Seal of the United States Department of the Treasury

Office overview
- Formed: 2004
- Preceding office: Office of National Security (ONS)
- Jurisdiction: Executive branch of the United States
- Office executive: Peter Metzger, Assistant Secretary of the Treasury for Intelligence and Analysis
- Parent department: U.S. Department of the Treasury
- Website: Official website

The Office of Intelligence and Analysis (OIA) is an agency of the United States Department of the Treasury responsible for the receipt, analysis, collation, and dissemination of foreign intelligence and counterintelligence information related to the operation and responsibilities of the Treasury Department.

Organized within the Office of Terrorism and Financial Intelligence, OIA’s efforts inform and support the Treasury Department’s ability to address illicit finance and national security threats to the U.S. such as terrorists, proliferators, rogue regimes, and criminal actors.

== History ==
In its own account, the Office of Intelligence and Analysis traces its lineage to the pre-Constitutional Confederation Period and a 1782 instruction by the Congress of the Confederation to Robert Morris, Superintendent of Finance of the United States, to root out fraud in the Army.

In 1961, the Treasury Department established a foreign intelligence capability, the Office of National Security (ONS), and charged by Treasury Secretary Douglas Dillon to connect the Treasury Department with the broader efforts of the National Security Council. In 1977, ONS was overhauled and renamed the Office of Intelligence Support (OIS) by Treasury Secretary Michael Blumenthal.

=== Inclusion of the Treasury Department in the Intelligence Community ===
The United States Intelligence Community (IC) as a formal collection of agencies was created through Executive Order 12333 ("United States Intelligence Activities") signed by President Ronald Reagan on December 4, 1981. The U.S. Department of Treasury was given intelligence responsibilities through instructions to the United States Secretary of the Treasury:

(a) Overtly collect foreign financial and monetary information;

(b) Participate with the Department of State in the overt collection of general foreign economic information;

(c) Produce and disseminate foreign intelligence relating to United States economic policy as required for the execution of the Secretary's responsibilities.

— "Goals, Direction, Duties And Responsibilities with Respect to the National Intelligence Effort: The Department of the Treasury", United States Intelligence Activities, Executive Order 12333

== Authorizing legislation ==
The U.S. Congress created the Office of Intelligence and Analysis itself as a part of the Intelligence Authorization Act of 2004.

Congress followed up the next year with the Consolidated Appropriations Act, 2005. The Act organized OIA under an umbrella Office of Terrorism and Financial Intelligence (TFI), alongside the Office of Foreign Assets Control (OFAC) and the Office of Terrorist Financing and Financial Crimes. The leadership of OIA was made an Assistant Secretary appointed by the President with the advice and consent of the Senate.

With the rest of the U.S. Intelligence Community, OIA was subject to the Intelligence Reform and Terrorism Prevention Act that replaced the Director of Central Intelligence with the Director of National Intelligence.

== Activities ==
With the creation of the TFI and the OIA, the Treasury Department established two secure networks for national security information: Treasury Secure Data Network (TSDN), for information classified Secret and Confidential and Treasury Foreign Intelligence Network (TFIN), classified as Top Secret and Sensitive Compartmentalized Information. The data from the TFIN system is shared by OIA with the Secretary of the Treasury, the Deputy Secretary of the Treasury, the Under Secretary for TFI, the Undersecretary for International Affairs, OFAC, the Financial Crimes Enforcement Network (FinCEN) and other components. An audit of the Treasury Inspector General states that TFIN was established for 30 users, but by 2008 had grown to "approximately 130."

In 2006, Eric Lichtblau and James Risen wrote about the Treasury's participation in disrupting terrorist financing following the Bush administration's signing of Executive Order 13224 which invoked the President's International Emergency Economic Powers Act authorities against suspected terrorists. The article described the Treasury's Terrorist Finance Tracking Program in which it worked with two Intelligence Community members (the Central Intelligence Agency and National Security Agency) to obtain and exploit data from Society for Worldwide Interbank Financial Telecommunication (SWIFT). Responding to the article, Treasury Under Secretary for TFI Stuart Levey acknowledged the existence of the program and defended the Terrorist Finance Tracking Program as both legal and effective. The article noted claims that the data had been crucial to the capture of Riduan Isamuddin.

Subsequent to the exposure of the Terrorist Finance Tracking Program, the Privacy and Civil Liberties Oversight Board (PCLOB) staff wrote a memorandum summarizing the issues raised and provided a list of questions about the program to the Board. On November 26, 2006 the PCLOB sat through a briefing about the OIA's role Terrorist Finance Tracking Program, including the OIA's analysis of the SWIFT data obtained through administrative subpoena.

In 2006 testimony to the United States Senate Appropriations Subcommittee on Transportation, Housing and Urban Development, and Related Agencies, Assistant Secretary for OIA Janice B. Gardner stated that OIA initiated weekly targeting sessions, led by TFI Undersecretary Stuart A. Levey and including officials from OIA, OFAC, and FinCEN and produced written assessments of possible foreign terrorist financing through non-governmental organizations. The same remarks credited OIA for authorship of 50 of its own cables, and its participation in the drafting and coordination of the National Intelligence Estimates and Central Intelligence Agency studies.

In the Global War on Terror, OIA led the establishment of the Iraq Threat Finance Cells blending intelligence, military and law enforcement personnel to help identify and interdict funding streams to terrorist and insurgent networks. The model was later reproduced with the Afghan Threat Finance Cell.

A December 2019 U.S. Government Accountability Office (GAO) study of Treasury counternarcotics activities found that Office of Foreign Assets Control uses OIA-produced assessments before and after the designation of individuals for sanctions under the Kingpin Act.

A March 2020 GAO study of sanctions programs estimated that OIA personnel devote "approximately half of their time" to work on sanctions implementation.

=== Performance measures ===
Though OIA is an intelligence agency, it is nevertheless subject to the Government Performance and Results Act and required to identify "key factors external to the agency and beyond its control that could significantly affect the achievement of the general goals and objectives."

In 2022, the TFI reports one performance highlight related to the Office of Intelligence and Analysis, "customer satisfaction with OIA products," in its Budget-in-Brief for Fiscal Year 2023.

"Performance Highlights" from the U.S. Department of the Treasury FY 2023 Budget-in-Brief
Budget Activity	Performance Measure	FY 2021 Actual	FY 2022 Actual	FY 2023 Target
Terrorism and Financial Intelligence	Percent customer satisfaction with OIA products	70%	74%	74%
