= Adam Szubin =

American politician

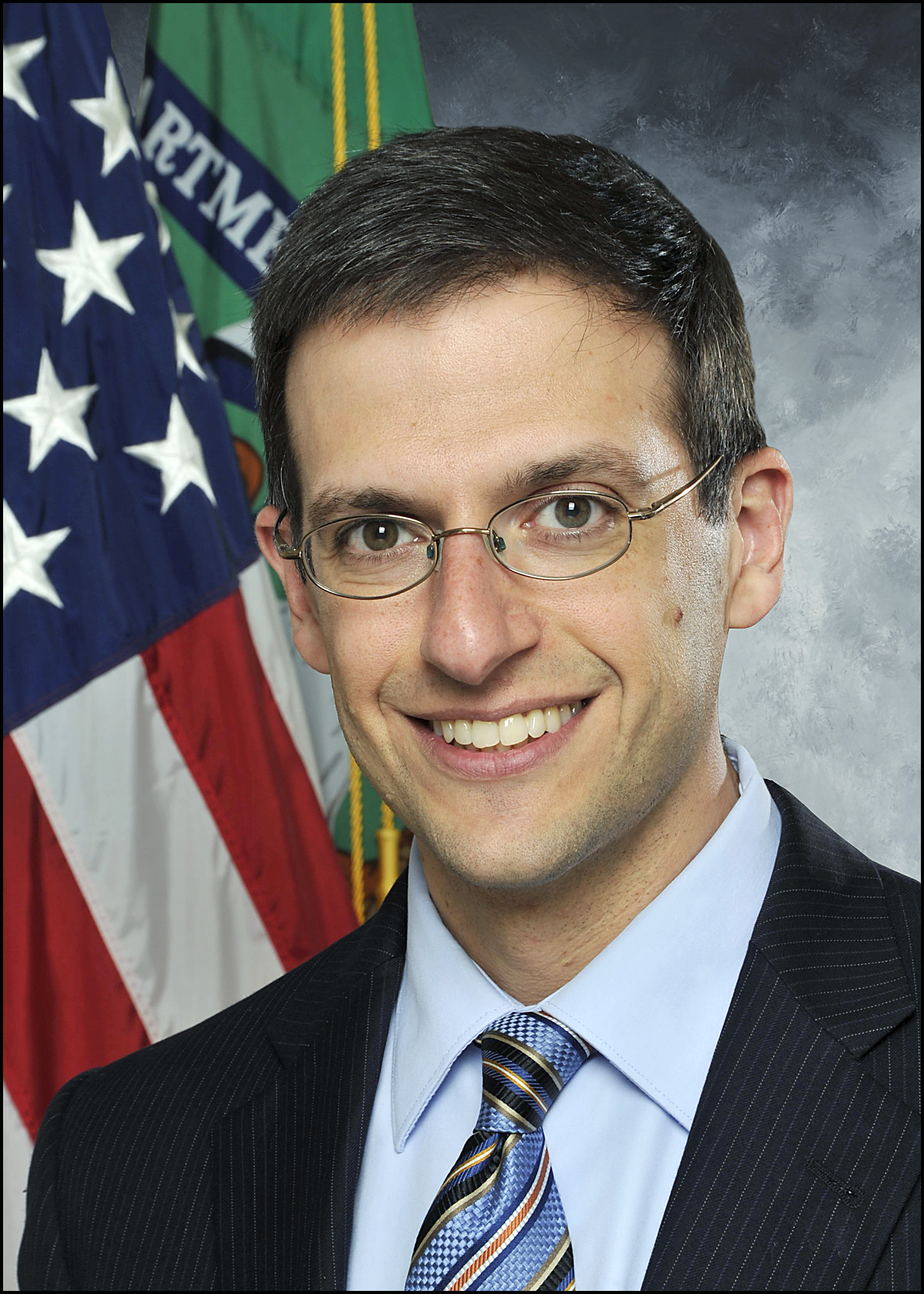

United States Secretary of the Treasury
- Acting; January 20, 2017 – February 13, 2017
- President: Donald Trump
- Preceded by: Jack Lew
- Succeeded by: Steven Mnuchin

Under Secretary of the Treasury for Terrorism and Financial Intelligence
- Acting; April 16, 2015 – February 13, 2017
- President: Barack Obama; Donald Trump
- Preceded by: David Cohen
- Succeeded by: Sigal Mandelker

Personal details
- Born: 1972 or 1973 (age 53–54) Teaneck, New Jersey, U.S.
- Party: Democratic
- Spouse: Miriam Szubin
- Children: 3
- Education: Harvard University (BA, JD)

Adam Jacob Szubin (/ˈzuːbɪn/) is an American lawyer and former government official. Szubin served as the Acting Under Secretary for Terrorism and Financial Intelligence and the Acting Secretary of the Treasury of the United States. He served as the acting secretary from January to February 2017 after the resignation of Treasury Secretary Jack Lew and Deputy Treasury Secretary Sarah Bloom Raskin during the 2017 presidential transition. He previously served as the Director of Treasury's Office of Foreign Assets Control (OFAC).

He is currently a Distinguished Practitioner-in-Residence at the Paul H. Nitze School of Advanced International Studies (SAIS) of the Johns Hopkins University and a lawyer in private practice at Covington & Burling in D.C.

== Education ==
Szubin is from an Orthodox Jewish family and attended Yavneh Academy and the Ramaz School. He received an A.B. from Harvard College and a J.D. from Harvard Law School.

== Department of the Treasury ==
Joining the Treasury in 2004, Szubin served in the Bush administration as the Senior Advisor to the Under Secretary for Terrorism and Financial Intelligence. From 2006 to 2015, Szubin served as the Director of Treasury's Office of Foreign Assets Control.

On April 16, 2015, President Obama nominated him as Under Secretary for Terrorism and Financial Crimes. In 2015, he appeared before the Senate Committee on Banking, Housing, and Urban Affairs. In 2016, the Senate Banking Committee approved his nomination but he was never confirmed by the full Senate.

Still unconfirmed, President Trump asked him to stay on in his post as Under Secretary. He became the Acting Secretary of the Treasury of the United States on January 20, 2017 after the resignation of Treasury Secretary Jack Lew and Deputy Treasury Secretary Sarah Bloom Raskin. After the confirmation of Steven Mnuchin as Secretary of the Treasury, Szubin left government service.

== Personal life ==
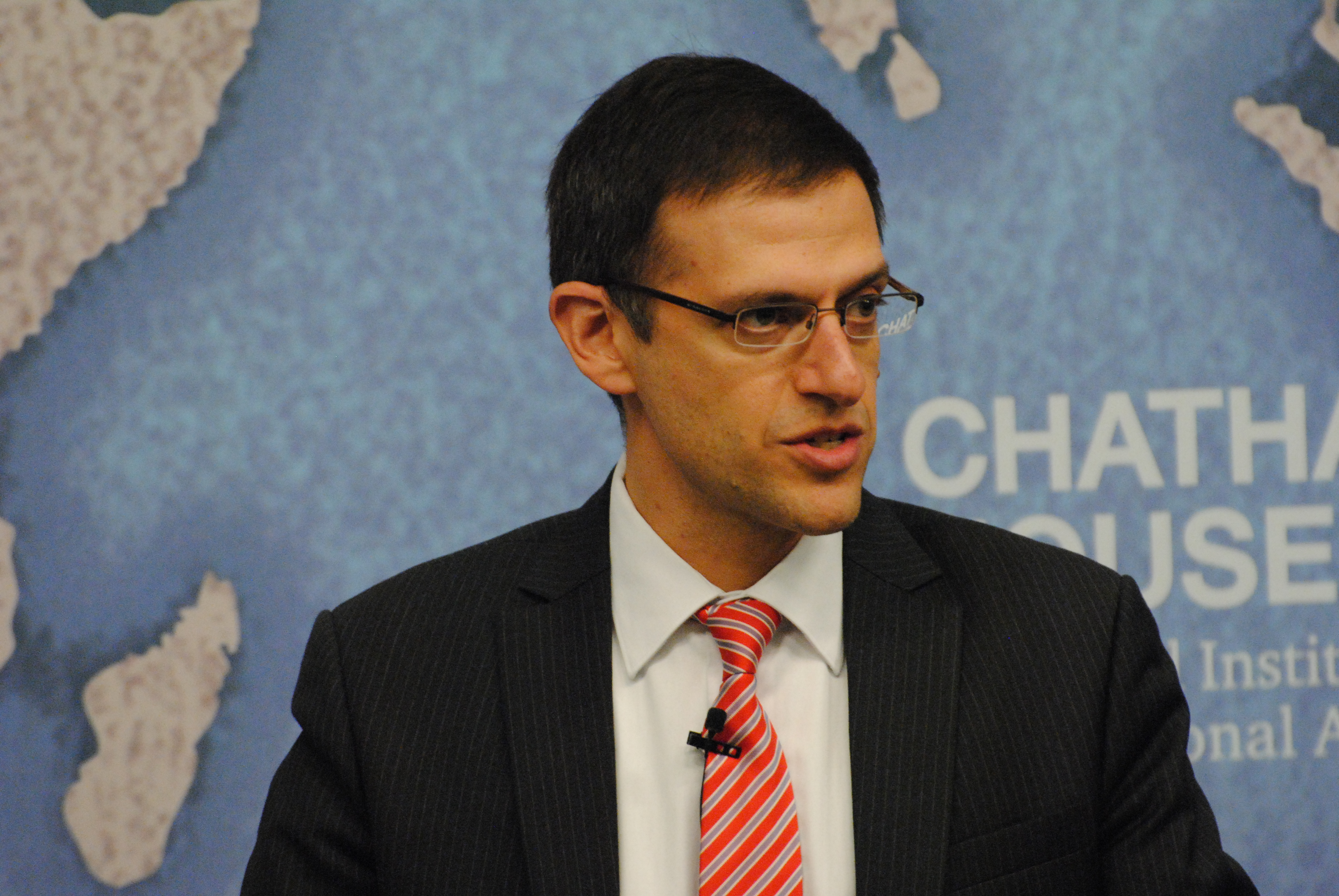
Adam Szubin, Acting Under Secretary for Terrorism and Financial Intelligence

Szubin lives in Washington, DC, with his wife, Miriam Weiner Szubin, and their three sons.

Political offices
Preceded by Jack Lew	United States Secretary of the Treasury; Acting; 2017	Succeeded by Steven Mnuchin
