= Husayn al-Shami =

Hezbollah leader

Husayn al-Shami is a Shia Lebanese and also the head of Bayt al-Mal and a senior Hezbollah leader who has served as a member of Hezbollah's Shura Council and as the head of several Hezbollah-controlled organizations, including the Islamic Resistance Support Organization. Shami is also responsible for foreign donations to Hezbollah fundraising organizations.
