= Justin Muzinich =

American businessman and lawyer (born 1977)

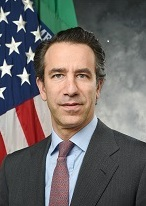
- Official portrait, 2017

14th United States Deputy Secretary of the Treasury
- In office December 12, 2018 – January 20, 2021
- President: Donald Trump
- Preceded by: Sarah Bloom Raskin
- Succeeded by: Wally Adeyemo

Personal details
- Born: Justin George Muzinich; November 5, 1977 (age 49) New York City, U.S.
- Spouse: Eloise Davis Austin
- Education: Harvard University (BA, MBA); Yale University (JD)

Justin George Muzinich (/muːˈzɛnˌɪtʃ/ moo-ZEH-nich, born November 5, 1977) is an American businessman and lawyer. He served as the United States Deputy Secretary of the Treasury, from December 2018 to January 2021, during the first Trump presidency. Previously, he was Counselor to the Secretary at the United States Department of the Treasury. Prior to that, he served as policy director for the Jeb Bush presidential campaign.

== Early life and education ==
Muzinich was born to Camille Muzinich, a docent for the Metropolitan Museum of Art in New York City, and George Milan Muzinich, president of Muzinich & Company, a New York finance firm.

After attending Groton School, Muzinich entered Harvard College where he graduated with a Bachelor of Arts degree magna cum laude and as a member of Phi Beta Kappa in 2000. He earned a Master of Business Administration degree from Harvard Business School in 2005 as a Baker Scholar, and a Juris Doctor degree from Yale Law School in 2007, where he was a John M. Olin Fellow.

== Business career ==
Prior to joining the Treasury department, Muzinich was previously employed at EMS Capital and at Morgan Stanley in the mergers and acquisitions group. He also served as president of Muzinich & Company, an international investment firm founded by his father. He has also taught at Columbia Business School from 2014 to 2016.

Following his term as Deputy Secretary, Muzinich returned to Muzinich & Company. Muzinich currently serves as the CEO, and is a member of the Board of Owners.

== Public sector ==
=== Jeb Bush campaign ===
Muzinich served as Policy Director for former Florida Governor Jeb Bush’s 2016 Presidential campaign. In this role, Muzinich oversaw a team that produced policy proposals for the campaign. Governor Bush later announced his public support of Muzinich’s 2018 nomination to Treasury.

=== United States Treasury ===
Muzinich served as United States Deputy Secretary of the Treasury. In that role, Muzinich helped oversee the Department’s $2.2 trillion rescue plan for the COVID-19 outbreak and the Administration’s 2017 Tax Cuts and Jobs Act.

The New York Times reported that he kept a low public profile.

==== Nomination ====
On March 13, 2018, President Donald Trump announced his intention to nominate Muzinich as the new United States Deputy Secretary of the Treasury, succeeding Sigal Mandelker. The United States Senate confirmed his nomination with a 55–44 vote.

==== Tax Cuts and Jobs Act of 2017 ====
Muzinich was an architect of the Administration's tax reform effort, ultimately resulting in the Tax Cuts and Jobs Act of 2017.

==== CARES Act ====
Muzinich helped draft and oversee the U.S. government's $2.2 trillion rescue plan for the COVID-19 outbreak. The Wall Street Journal profiled his work on the CARES Act.

ProPublica reported in June 2020 that Muzinich transferred his ownership of at least $60 million in assets to his father who would be free to return them to Muzinich after he leaves government. The assets in question are shares in the company Muzinich & Co., which specializes in junk bonds. This firm was a beneficiary of a unprecedented decision by the Treasury and Federal Reserve to bail out the junk bond market as a response to the economic impact of the COVID-19 pandemic. Muzinich's actions had been disclosed to and approved by the Treasury Ethics Office and the Office of Government Ethics.

== Life after public service ==
Following his departure from public service, Muzinich served as a distinguished fellow at the CFR from 2021 to 2023 and as a senior fellow at Harvard Kennedy School from 2022 to 2023. In March 2025, he joined Gina Raimondo and James Taiclet as chairs of the Council on Foreign Relations Task Force on Economic Security.

Muzinich has written for sites such as Foreign Affairs, New York Times, Washington Post, Wall St Journal, Hoover Institution and Council on Foreign Relations.

== Boards and affiliations ==
He is a member of the Board of Trustees at NewYork–Presbyterian Hospital and a board director at the National Bureau of Economic Research(NBER) and the Council on Foreign Relations.

== Personal life ==
Muzinich married Eloise Davis Austin in 2008.

Political offices
Preceded by Sarah Bloom Raskin	United States Deputy Secretary of the Treasury; 2018–2021	Succeeded by Wally Adeyemo
