= Nancy Northup =

American political activist

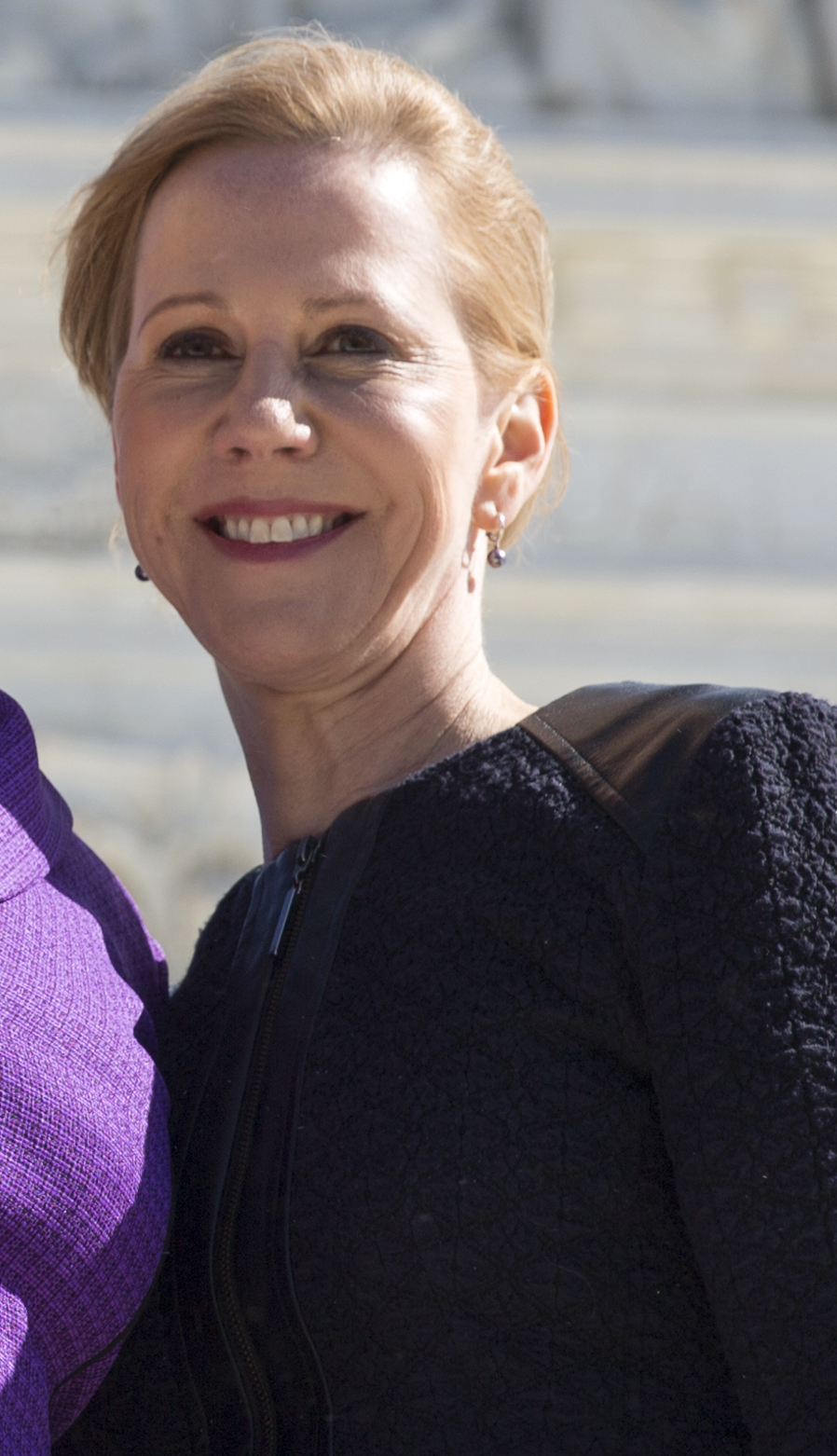
- Northup in 2016
- Born: 1960 (age 65–66); Kokomo, Indiana, U.S.
- Education: Brown University (BA); Columbia University (JD)
- Spouse: Jim Johnson

Nancy Northup (born 1960) is an American political activist. She is the president of the Center for Reproductive Rights, an abortion rights organization, in New York City.

Under her leadership, the Center helped win Whole Woman's Health v. Hellerstedt, a U.S. Supreme Court case.

== Early life and education ==
Northup was born in Kokomo, Indiana in 1960 and grew up in Texas, California and New York. She graduated from Allendale Columbia School in Rochester, New York. She then graduated magna cum laude from Brown University in 1981; and from Columbia Law School, where she was a James Kent Scholar and managing editor of the Columbia Law Review.

== Career ==
Northup was the founding director of the Democracy Program at the Brennan Center for Justice at NYU School of Law. From 1989 to 1996, she served as a prosecutor and deputy chief of appeals in the U.S. Attorney's Office for the Southern District of New York.

She served as a law clerk to Alvin B. Rubin of the U.S. Court of Appeals for the Fifth Circuit in New Orleans. Northup holds adjunct appointments at NYU Law School and Columbia Law School, where she has taught courses in constitutional and human rights law.

== Personal life ==
Northup lives in New York City. She is married to Jim Johnson, the Corporation Counsel of the City of New York and a former candidate for New Jersey governor.
