= Raymond Kelly =

American law enforcement official (born 1941)

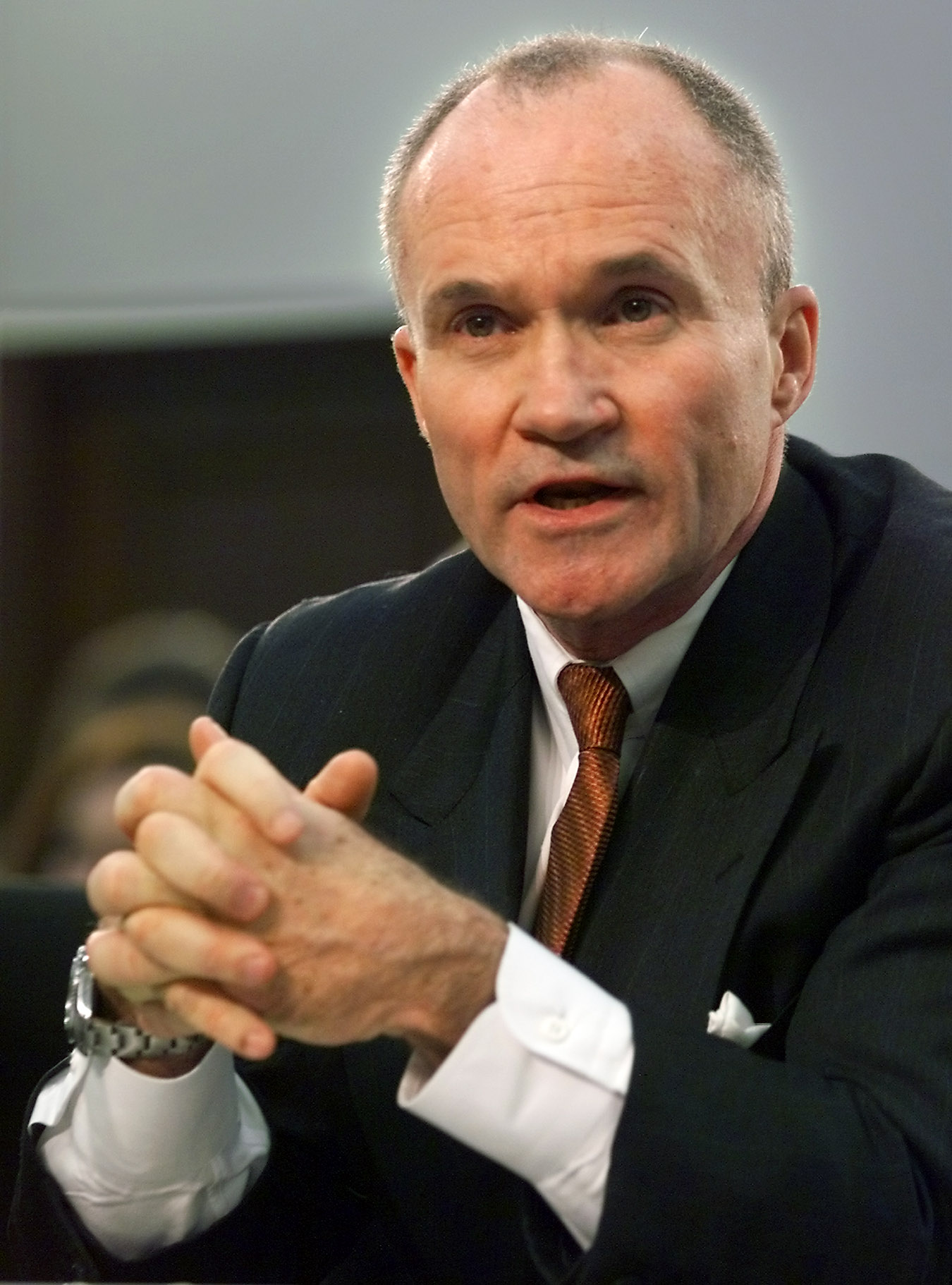
- Kelly in 1999

37th and 41st Police Commissioner of New York City
- In office January 1, 2002 – December 31, 2013
- Mayor: Michael Bloomberg
- Preceded by: Bernie Kerik
- Succeeded by: Bill Bratton
- In office September 1, 1992 – January 1, 1994; Acting: September 1, 1992 – October 16, 1992
- Mayor: David Dinkins
- Preceded by: Lee Brown
- Succeeded by: Bill Bratton

16th Commissioner of the United States Customs Service
- In office July 31, 1998 – January 19, 2001
- President: Bill Clinton
- Preceded by: George Weise
- Succeeded by: Robert Bonner

Under Secretary of the Treasury for Terrorism and Financial Intelligence
- In office June 3, 1996 – July 30, 1998
- President: Bill Clinton
- Preceded by: Ronald Noble
- Succeeded by: Jim Johnson

Personal details
- Born: Raymond Walter Kelly; September 4, 1941 (age 85) New York City, U.S.
- Party: Independent
- Spouse: Veronica
- Children: 2, including Greg Kelly
- Education: Manhattan University (BA); St. John's University (JD); New York University (LLM); Harvard Kennedy School (MPA)

Military service
- Allegiance: United States
- Branch/service: United States Marine Corps
- Years of service: 1963–1966 (active); 1966–1996 (reserve)
- Rank: Colonel
- Battles/wars: Vietnam War
- Police Career
- Department: New York City Police Department
- Service years: 1960–1994; 2002–2013
- Rank: Commissioner

Raymond Walter Kelly (born September 4, 1941) is an American police officer who was the longest-serving commissioner in the history of the New York City Police Department (NYPD) and the first person to hold the post for two non-consecutive tenures. Kelly, a lifelong New Yorker, spent 45 years in the NYPD, serving in 25 different commands and as police commissioner from 1992 to 1994 and again from 2002 until 2013.

Kelly was the first man to rise from police cadet to police commissioner, holding all of the department's ranks, except for three-star bureau chief, chief of department and deputy commissioner, having been promoted directly from two-star chief to first deputy commissioner in 1990. After his handling of the World Trade Center bombing in 1993, he was mentioned for the first time as a possible candidate for FBI Director. After Kelly turned down the position, Louis Freeh was appointed.

Kelly was a Marine Corps Reserve colonel, director of police under the United Nations Mission in Haiti, and an Interpol vice president. During the Clinton administration, Kelly served as Treasury Department Under Secretary for Enforcement, as Customs Service Commissioner and was in the running to become the first United States Ambassador to Vietnam, after President Bill Clinton extended full diplomatic relations to that country in 1995.

In March 2011, New York Senator Chuck Schumer endorsed Kelly to become the next director of the FBI, and in July 2013, he endorsed Kelly to become Secretary of Homeland Security.

In March 2014, he was appointed as President of Risk Management Services at Cushman & Wakefield, a New York City-based commercial real estate services firm.

== Early life and education ==
Kelly was born September 4, 1941, in New York City and raised on the Upper West Side of Manhattan, to James F. Kelly, a milkman, and Elizabeth Kelly, a dressing-room checker at Macy's.

Kelly graduated from Archbishop Molloy High School in 1959. He graduated with a Bachelor of Business Administration from Manhattan University in 1963. He also holds a J.D. from the St. John's University School of Law, a LL.M. from the New York University School of Law, and an M.P.A. from Harvard Kennedy School.

Kelly has also been the recipient of honorary degrees from Marist College, Manhattan University, the College of St. Rose, St. John's University, the State University of New York, New York University, Iona College, Pace University, Quinnipiac University, St. Thomas Aquinas College and the Catholic University of America.

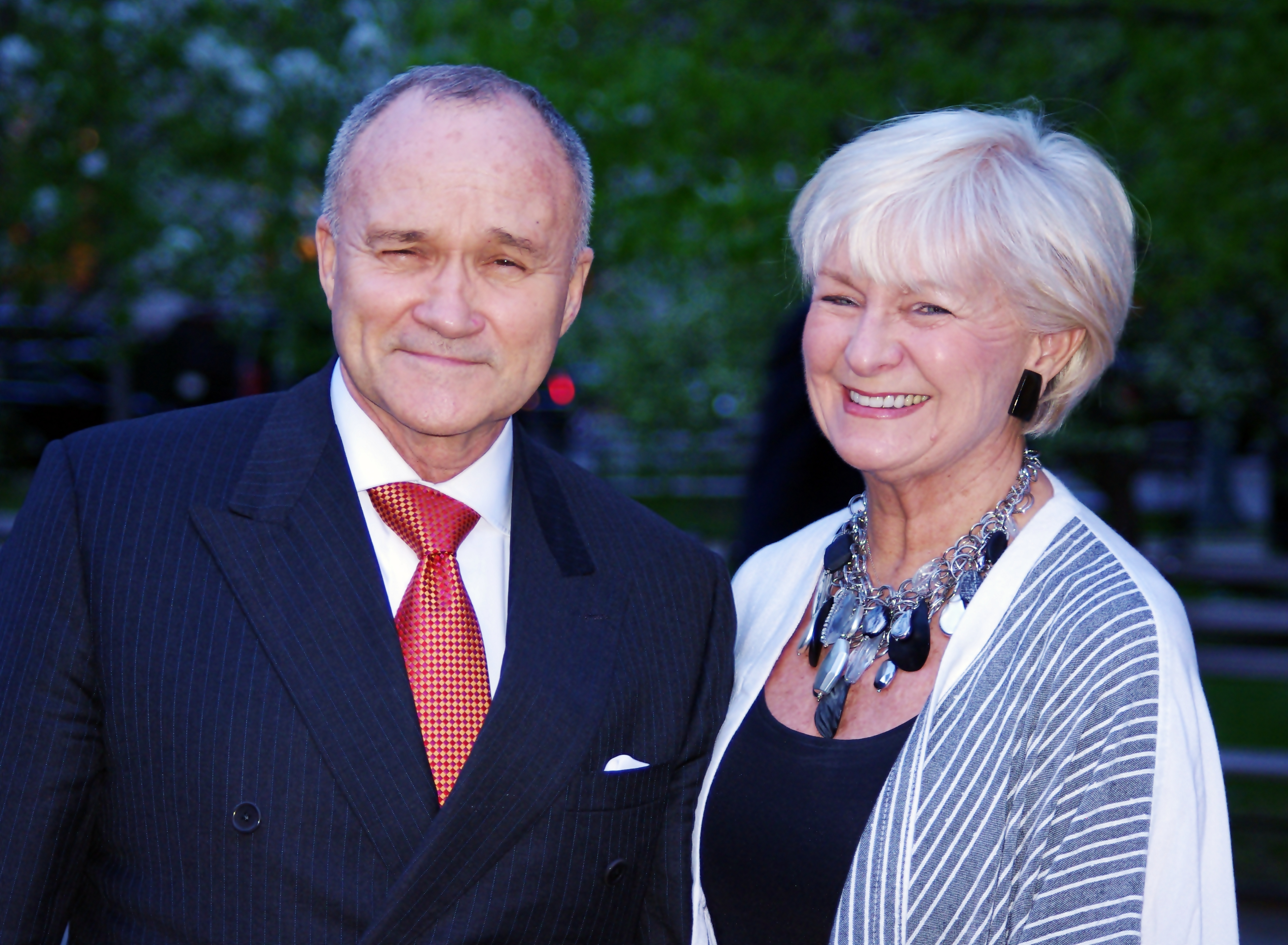
Kelly with his wife Veronica in May 2011

== Military career ==
Kelly is a combat veteran of the Vietnam War. He received his commission as a second lieutenant in the United States Marine Corps in 1963. In 1965, he went to the Republic of Vietnam with the 2nd Battalion 1st Marines. As a first lieutenant in Vietnam, Kelly led Marines in battle for most of his 12 months in country, including participation in Operation Harvest Moon. Upon returning to the U.S., Raymond Kelly joined the Reserves and retired after 30 years of service with the rank of colonel from the Marine Corps Reserves.

== Early police career ==
Kelly joined the New York City Police Department as a police trainee in 1960. Six years later in 1966, Kelly was appointed to the entry level rank of Patrolman. He graduated first in his class from the New York City Police Academy and passed the sergeant's test upon returning from Vietnam. This meteoric ascent combined with relative inexperience as a beat cop has prompted some criticisms from colleagues. Geoffrey Gray wrote in New York Magazine that, "Some retired cops say Kelly's swift ascent makes him a boss who doesn't understand the street. 'He's not a cop,' says one retired chief, dismissively. 'He's on patrol for a blink of an eye and tells guys on patrol ten years how to do their jobs.' Says another, 'He gives you all the ingredients to make shrimp scampi and says he wants sirloin steak.'"

However, his long service stands in stark contrast to that of his predecessor, Bernard Kerik. Kerik served as an NYPD officer for only 8 years before he was appointed commissioner by Mayor Rudy Giuliani.

=== First Deputy Commissioner ===
On February 9, 1990, Kelly was appointed First Deputy Commissioner during the administration of Mayor David Dinkins. Kelly's boss was New York City Police Commissioner Lee Brown, who was a former Houston Police Chief and the future mayor of Houston.

Kelly was promoted from a two-star assistant chief to the first deputy position over several three-star bureau chiefs and the four-star chief of department, Robert J. Johnston Jr.

At the time Johnston was so powerful, Brown altered the traditional hierarchy by announcing that Johnston would report directly to the police commissioner rather than the first deputy as had been called for under the former departmental structure. This was done to prevent Johnston from having to report to his former subordinate, Kelly.

== 37th NYC police commissioner ==
On October 16, 1992, Mayor Dinkins appointed Kelly as the 37th police commissioner of the City of New York. Kelly took over a police department that was 11.5% black, in a city with an over 25% black population. At 9 am on his first full day as police commissioner, Kelly was on the "black-owned" radio station WLIB for 40 minutes talking to host Art Whaley, as well as callers, to discuss minority recruitment. He showed himself a master of outreach and even attended black church services in an effort to recruit minority policemen.

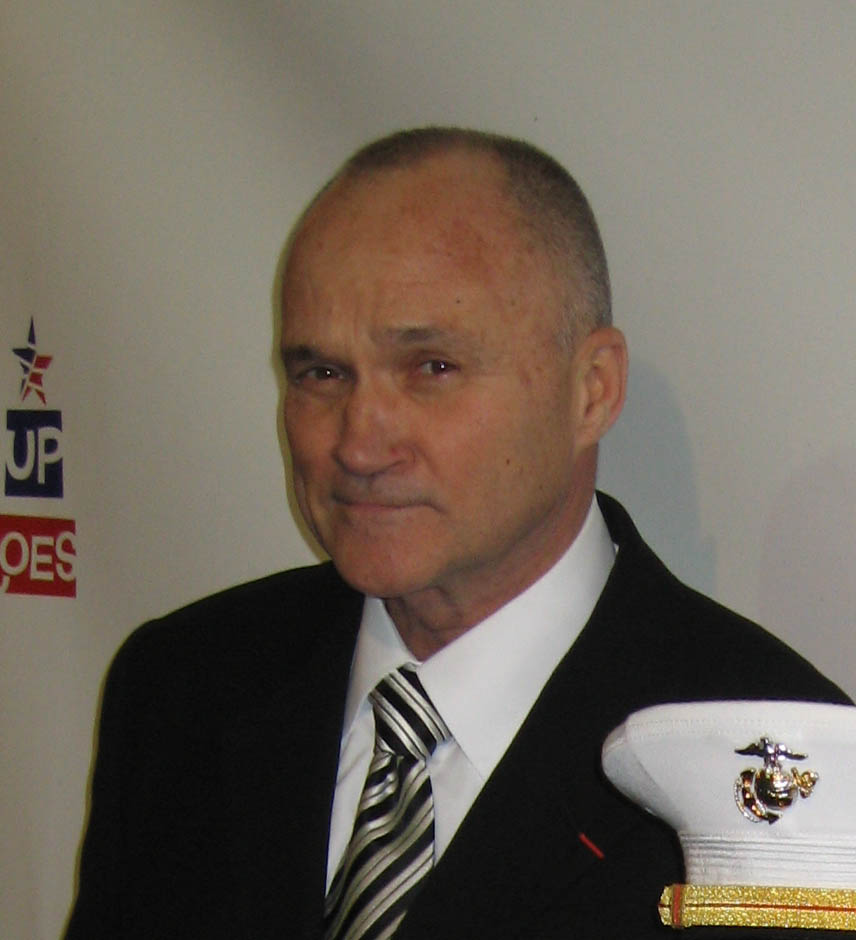
Kelly in 2007

The national decline in both violent crime and property crime began in 1993, during the early months of Raymond Kelly's commissioner-ship under Dinkins. A firm believer in community policing, Kelly helped spur the decline in New York by instituting the Safe Streets, Safe City program, which put thousands more cops on the streets, where they would be visible to and able to get to know and interact with local communities. As the 37th commissioner, he also pursued quality of life issues, such as the "squeegee men" that had become a sign of decay in the city. The murder rate in New York city had declined from its 1990 mid-Dinkins administration historic high of 2,254 to 1,927 when Kelly left in 1994, and continued to plummet even more steeply under mayors Giuliani and Bloomberg. The decline continued when Kelly returned as commissioner under Mayor Bloomberg in 2002–2013.

=== 1993 World Trade Center terrorist attack ===
The first World Trade Center terrorist attack occurred on February 26, 1993, while Kelly was police commissioner under Mayor Dinkins (1992 to 1994) and Kelly led his department through the investigation of the bombing.

=== 1993 NYPD handgun transition ===
In August 1993, Kelly introduced the 9mm semi-automatic pistol as an option for officers. The Glock 19, SIG Sauer P226, and Smith & Wesson 5946 pistols were approved for duty to replace the NYPD's Smith & Wesson Model 10 and Model 64 double-action only revolvers chambered in .38 Special. Himself a former street cop, Kelly was concerned about the semi-automatic pistols' propensity for sustaining firearm malfunctions. Indeed, at a media event introducing the new semi-automatic pistols in January 1993, one of the firearms malfunctioned just moments after a deputy inspector explained that malfunctions and failures were the semi-automatic pistol's major design drawback.

== Transition ==
In November 1993, Rudolph Giuliani defeated Mayor Dinkins in his run for a second term as Mayor of New York City. Giuliani then replaced Kelly with Boston police commissioner William Bratton. Coincidentally, Giuliani and Kelly had known each other for a long time; they were two years apart at Manhattan University (Then Manhattan College) three decades prior.

== 41st NYC police commissioner ==
As commissioner of the NYPD under Mayor Michael Bloomberg, Kelly had often appeared at outreach events such as the Brooklyn's annual West Indian Day Parade, where he was photographed playing the drums and speaking to community leaders. Bloomberg and Kelly, however, continued to place heavy reliance on the CompStat system, initiated by Bill Bratton and since adopted by police departments in other cities worldwide. The system, while recognized as highly effective in reducing crime, also puts pressure on local precincts to reduce the number of reports for the seven major crimes while increasing the number of lesser arrests. The two men continued and indeed stepped up Mayor Giuliani's controversial stop-and-frisk policy, which was determined in Floyd v. City of New York to be an unconstitutional form of racial profiling. In the first half of 2011 the NYC police made 362,150 such stops, constituting a 13.5 percent increase from the same period in 2010, according to WNYC radio (which also reported that 84 percent of the people stopped were either black or Latino, and that "nine out 10 stops did not result in any arrest or ticket.") According to New York State Senator Eric Adams, "Kelly was one of the great humanitarians in policing under David Dinkins. I don't know what happened to him that all of a sudden his philosophical understanding of the importance of community and police liking each other has changed. Sometimes the expeditious need of bringing down crime numbers bring out the worst in us. So instead of saying let's just go seek out the bad guy, we get to the point of, 'Let's go get them all.' If Kelly can't philosophically change, then we need to have a leadership change at the top."

Under Bloomberg, Commissioner Kelly also revamped New York City's Police Department into a world-class counter-terrorism operation, operating in conjunction with CIA. Prior to the September 11, 2001 attacks there were fewer than two dozen officers working on terrorism full-time; ten years later there were over 1,000. One of Kelly's innovations was his unprecedented stationing of New York City police detectives in other cities throughout the world following terrorist attacks in those cities, with a view to determining if they are in any way connected to the security of New York. In the cases of both the March 11, 2004 Madrid bombing and the July 7, 2005 London bombings and July 21, 2005 London bombings, NYPD detectives were on the scene within a day to relay pertinent information back to New York. An August 2011 article by the Associated Press reported the NYCPD's extensive use of undercover agents (colloquially referred to as "rakers" and "mosque crawlers") to keep tabs, even build databases, on stores, restaurants, mosques. and clubs. NYPD spokesman Paul Browne denied that police trawled ethnic neighborhoods, telling the AP that officers only follow leads. He also dismissed the idea of "mosque crawlers," saying, "Someone has a great imagination."

Valerie Caproni, the FBI's general counsel, told the AP that the FBI is barred from sending agents into mosques looking for leads outside of a specific investigation and said the practice would raise alarms. "If you're sending an informant into a mosque when there is no evidence of wrongdoing, that's a very high-risk thing to do," she said. "You're running right up against core constitutional rights. You're talking about freedom of religion." However, as the ACLU acknowledged at the time, the FBI operates under limits such as the Federal Privacy Act that do not apply to state-authorized agencies such as the NYPD.

Under Mayor Bloomberg, Kelly's NYPD also incurred criticism for its handling of the protests surrounding the 2004 Republican National Convention, which resulted in the City of New York having to pay out millions in settlement of lawsuits for false arrest and civil rights violations, as well as for its rough treatment of credentialed reporters covering the 2011 Occupy Wall Street demonstrations.

On March 5, 2007, it was announced that a Rikers Island inmate offered to pay an undercover police officer posing as a hit person to behead Kelly as well as bomb police headquarters in retaliation for the controversial police shooting of Sean Bell.

In 2012, Kelly oversaw the rollout of the Domain Awareness System, a computer system used for Police surveillance in New York City.

In 2013 his visit to Brown University was met with a demonstration against what protestors saw as increased racial profiling and violations of civil rights under Kelly's leadership as NYPD commissioner.

In November 2014 it was reported that Kelly would no longer require a $1.5 million security team after completing his transition into the private sector. Prior to relieving his security detail and since leaving office, Kelly had 24-hour-a-day protection consisting of an NYPD lieutenant, three sergeants and six detectives. With their $140,000 salaries (plus overtime), the ten-man team cost New York City taxpayers $1.5 million. The NYPD had argued this was a necessary expense due to the threats Kelly and his family received as a result of his work. Kelly determined he was no longer the target he once was.

=== New York City Police Pension Fund ===
In April 2009, Kelly abstained in a vote to remove Quadrangle Group from doing business with the NYC police pension fund.

=== Potential involvement in Schoolcraft case ===
Kelly may have been aware of the alleged NYPD conspiracy against whistleblower Adrian Schoolcraft. According to the Village Voice: "If proven true, [NYPD spokesperson Paul] Browne's presence at Schoolcraft's home on Oct. 31, 2009 suggests that Commissioner Kelly was aware of the decision by Deputy Chief Michael Marino to order Schoolcraft handcuffed and dragged from his own apartment just three weeks after he reported police misconduct to the unit which audits NYPD crime statistics."

== Other positions ==
=== Director International Police Monitors ===
Kelly served as director of the International Police Monitors of the Multinational Force in Haiti from October 1994 through March 1995. This U.S.-led force was responsible for ending human rights abuses and establishing an interim police force there. For his service in Haiti, President Bill Clinton awarded Kelly a commendation for "exceptionally meritorious service". Kelly was also awarded the Commander's Award for Public Service by then Chairman of the Joint Chiefs of Staff Gen. Shalikashvili.

=== Under Secretary for Enforcement ===
From 1996 to 1998, Kelly was Under Secretary for Enforcement at the United States Department of the Treasury. At that post he supervised the department's enforcement bureaus, including the Customs Service, the Secret Service and the Bureau of Alcohol, Tobacco and Firearms, the Federal Law Enforcement Training Center, the Financial Crimes Enforcement Network and the Office of Foreign Assets Control.

=== Interpol, Executive Committee ===
Kelly served on the executive committee and was elected vice president for the Americas of Interpol from 1996 to 2000.

=== Commissioner, U.S. Customs Service ===
From 1998 to 2001, Kelly served as the commissioner of the U.S. Customs Service, where he managed the agency's 20,000 employees and $20 billion annual budget.

=== Chairman, New York State Athletic Commission ===
In 2001, Governor George Pataki appointed Kelly to serve as chairman of the troubled New York State Athletic Commission. He resigned in 2002 to focus on his duties as police commissioner.

== Private sector ==
Kelly was Senior Managing Director for Corporate Security at Bear Stearns from 2000 to 2001.

Kelly also worked as the head of the New York office of Investigative Group International, a private investigations firm.

After leaving his post as New York City police commissioner, Kelly signed a deal with Greater Talent Network speakers bureau which was effective from January 1, 2014. He also works for K2 Intelligence, an investigative consultancy.

Kelly, a retired Marine colonel, was appointed as the grand marshal of the 95th annual Veterans Day parade in New York City in 2014. He marched with his wife, who was a member of the Coast Guard reserve.

In August 2021, Kelly was named as a member of American facial recognition company Clearview AI's advisory board.

== Department of Homeland Security speculation ==
In July 2013, Secretary of Homeland Security Janet Napolitano announced that she was resigning and Kelly was immediately cited as an obvious potential successor by New York Senator Charles Schumer and others.

During a July 16, 2013, interview, President Obama referred generally to the "bunch of strong candidates" for nomination to head the Department of Homeland Security (DHS), but singled out Kelly as "one of the best there is" or "very well qualified for the job". The next day, Kelly said he was "flattered" by Obama's praise but otherwise refused to confirm or deny whether he was interested in the secretary position. Describing "a growing campaign to quash the potential nomination of New York City Police Commissioner Raymond Kelly as the next secretary of the Department of Homeland Security", the Huffington Post cited a July 18 letter to Obama from a coalition of Muslim groups; the letter stated in part, "Commissioner Kelly's legacy in New York is synonymous with divisive, harmful and ineffective policing that promotes stereotypes and profiling". On July 22, Kelly penned a Wall Street Journal opinion article defending the NYPD's programs, stating "the average number of stops we conduct is less than one per officer per week" and that this and other practices have led to "7,383 lives saved... they are largely the lives of young men of color."

On October 17, 2013 President Obama moved to nominate Jeh Johnson to be United States Secretary of Homeland Security. The Washington Post reported "Johnson, an African-American, would bring further racial diversity to Obama's Cabinet. The first black U.S. president has been criticized for having a high number of white men in top Cabinet roles." In November 2013, a rule change in the United States Senate prevented the minority party from seriously contesting any executive nominee; Johnson was confirmed as DHS Secretary in December 2013.

== Anti-terrorism and safety ==
=== Civil liberties clashes ===
On October 16, 2011, the New York Civil Liberties Union filed a lawsuit in New York State Supreme Court in Manhattan seeking to force the New York Police Department to release the daily schedules of Commissioner Kelly, whom it characterized as "the most important appointed official" in city government. According to the suit the details of whom Kelly meets with remain largely shrouded in secrecy, in marked contrast to those of other high-placed officials, including the president of the United States, who are required to publicly disclose portions of their schedules. New York Governor Andrew Cuomo had begun posting a detailed version of his daily schedules online a month earlier. "There is no good reason for Commissioner Kelly to withhold this information from the public," Donna Lieberman, the executive director of the civil liberties group, said in a statement. "If it's safe for the leader of the country to disclose his schedule, then it's safe for the N.Y.P.D. commissioner to do the same."

In Kelly's defense, Mitchell L. Moss, a professor of urban policy and planning at New York University, argued that a police commissioner should get "broad latitude" in a post-terrorist era. According to Professor Moss, "The police commissioner of New York City occupies a special, appointed position. He's our secretary of defense, head of C.I.A. or, I would say, chief architect rolled into one. He may be the one person who we should treat with some respect on his privacy."

In an editorial entitled "They Like Transparency Until They Don't", the New York Times admonished:

In recent years, the New York Civil Liberties Union had to sue to get stop-and-frisk data from the police, details on the race of people shot by officers and shooting reports since 1997. Most recently, the group has filed a suit on behalf of an online columnist asking for Police Commissioner Raymond Kelly's calendar. The department has argued that the commissioner's whereabouts are secret for security reasons. Civil liberties lawyers note that the president's schedule appears daily on the White House Web site, so why not Mr. Kelly's?

Similarly, the Times was forced to go to court to get fuller access to police data. A judge had ruled in September 2011 that the New York Police Department had improperly withheld information about pistol owners and the locations of hate crimes.

=== Interview with 60 Minutes ===
On September 25, 2011, Kelly was interviewed on the television program 60 Minutes by Scott Pelley about anti-terrorism measures taken in New York City's financial district in the 10 years following the 9/11 attacks. One of these was the development of a $3-billion NYPD Joint Operations Center that includes representatives from the military, FBI, FEMA and state and local first responders. During the interview, Kelly asserted that the New York City police department possesses missiles that could take down a plane:

Pelley: Are you satisfied that you've dealt with threats from aircraft, even light planes, model planes, that kind of thing?
Kelly: It's something that's on our radar screen. In an extreme situation, we have some means to take down a plane ...
Pelley: Do you mean to say the NYPD has the means to take down an aircraft?
Kelly: Yes. I'd prefer not to get into the details, but obviously this would be in a very extreme situation ...
Pelley: You have the means and the training?
Kelly: Yes.

From the segment:

It is nearly impossible now to walk a block in lower Manhattan without being on television. There are 2,000 cameras and soon there will be 3,000 -- all of which feed into this control center housed in a secret location.

Technology built specifically for the NYPD includes radiological and nuclear detectors on boats, radiation detectors on helicopters and trucks and detectors on officers' gun belts so sensitive that people who have had medical procedures may trigger them. Lower Manhattan includes thousands of surveillance cameras that can identify shapes and sizes of unidentified "suspicious" packages and can track people descriptions, like, "someone wearing a red shirt," within seconds.

== Affiliations ==
Since becoming police commissioner, Kelly has served as the honorary president of the Police Athletic League of New York City (PAL) a non-profit youth development agency that helps inner-city children and teens.

Also during his service as commissioner under Mayor Bloomberg, Kelly has been a member of the Harvard Club of New York City, with membership and expenses charged covered by the privately funded New York City Police Foundation. The gift was not reported in Kelly's financial disclosures, but indications upon public revelation in 2010 were that the disclosures would be amended.

A 2010 report on gifts "reported six shared plane flights to Florida in 2008 and five more in 2009, provided by Mayor ... Bloomberg at an undetermined cost".

== Personal life ==
A fitness buff since his teens, Kelly still regularly lifts weights and does aerobic exercises. He is also reportedly a fashionable dresser, favoring custom-made shirts that he takes to Geneva, a shirtmaker, for laundering. He also favors silk ties by Charvet. "A tie is the only true way men can make some sort of statement", Kelly has stated, citing Barack Obama as another fan of the high-end French label. "I can tell when someone's wearing Charvet from a distance – even dark colors stand out." Claiming that good-quality clothing enhances his public image as an authority figure, he orders custom hand-tailored suits from master tailor Martin Greenfield, who numbers politicians and movie stars among his clientele and whose suits run in the four figures.

Kelly met his future wife Veronica on the beach at Island Park, New York, where his family had a summer residence.

Kelly is the father of Greg Kelly, former co-host of the local Fox morning television show Good Day New York, currently host on Newsmax TV and weekday program on New York's WABC radio

== Awards and honors ==
- Upon graduation from the New York City Police Academy, Kelly won the "Bloomingdale Trophy" for the highest general average in shooting and in academic and physical prowess.
- He has received 15 citations for meritorious service in the New York City Police Department.
- In 2003, the National Father's Day Committee named Kelly Father of the Year.
- On March 16, 2006, Kelly was named Irish American of the Year by Irish America.
- On June 19, 2006, Kelly received The Hundred Year Association of New York's Gold Medal "in recognition of outstanding contributions to the City of New York.
- On September 9, 2006, Kelly was awarded the Légion d'honneur during a ceremony at the French consulate in Manhattan, which was presided over by Nicolas Sarkozy, the then minister of the interior.
- On March 17, 2010, Kelly was the grand marshal of the 249th New York City St. Patrick's Day Parade.
- On March 14, 2012, Kelly was inducted into Irish America magazine's Hall of Fame.

== See also ==
- New York City Police Department
- NYPD Cricket League

Police appointments
Preceded by Lee Brown	Police Commissioner of New York City; 1992–1994	Succeeded by Bill Bratton
Preceded by Bernie Kerik	Police Commissioner of New York City; 2002–2013	Succeeded by Bill Bratton
Political offices
Preceded by George Weise	Commissioner of the United States Customs Service; 1998–2001	Succeeded by Robert Bonner
Preceded by Ronald Noble	Under Secretary of the Treasury for Terrorism and Financial Intelligence; 1996–1998	Succeeded by James Johnson
