= Protest of Ray Kelly at Brown University =

American student campus protest

Students protesting Ray Kelly's lecture outside of List Arts Center at Brown University.

On October 29, 2013, Brown University students and community members of Providence protested a lecture by then-NYPD Commissioner Raymond Kelly.

The event, hosted by Brown University's Taubman Center for Public Policy and American Institutions, was part of the Noah Krieger ‘93 Memorial Lecture series. It was titled "Proactive Policing in America's Biggest City." Protesters believe the platform of the lecture would serve to celebrate racial profiling and the controversial Stop-and-Frisk program. The lecture was ultimately canceled as a result of the protest.

== Background ==
=== Ray Kelly and Stop-and Frisk ===
Raymond Kelly is the longest-serving Commissioner of the New York Police Department. During his tenure as the 41st NYPD Police Commissioner, Kelly was a vocal proponent and implementer of the Stop-and-Frisk police program. On August 12, 2013, a U.S. District Court Judge declared the program unconstitutional for being enacted in a "racially discriminatory manner" and targeting racial minorities. Many civil rights organizations have long claimed that the practice was a form of racial profiling.

=== Noah Krieger '93 Memorial Lecture ===
The Noah Krieger '93 Memorial Lecture was established by the parents of Noah Krieger, a Brown alumnus who had died soon after graduation. A press release described the Krieger Lecture as "an annual lecture by a prominent individual who has made distinguished contributions to public service." The lecture is free and open to the public.

== Initial backlash ==
Brown University's Office of Public Affairs and University Relations began advertising the event in early October, including developing a guest list and a press release.

On Thursday October 17, a Brown alumnus emailed Professor Marion Orr, the director of the Taubman Center at the time, to express strong concern over the selection of Commissioner Kelly for the lecture.

By the week of October 21, Brown undergraduate students had begun meeting to discuss their concerns with Kelly's invitation and the framing of his policies in the advertisements for the event. These students also developing a relationship with Providence community organizations Direct Action for Rights and Equality (DARE) and Providence Youth Student Movement (PrYSM). On Thursday October 24, the students began to circulate a petition with three demands through online venues. The petition demanded: the lecture be cancelled, any honorarium for the lecture to be donated to organization fighting racial profiling and police brutality in Providence and New York, and transparency in the Taubman Center's selection and invitation process for bringing speakers to campus. By 3 p.m. the next day, the petition had garnered over 300 signatures and the students presented it to a staff member at the Taubman Center.

The next day a group of the student organizers spoke with Orr about their concerns. On Monday, there was a meeting between one of the students and administration to address the petition. The administration did not succumb to the demands, but increased the question and answer portion of the lecture from the previously allotted 15 minutes to 40 minutes.

The night before the protest, students and community members held a vigil to honor victims of racial profiling and police brutality.

== Lecture ==
On October 29, 2013, around 100 students and community members gathered outside of List Arts Center at Brown University with signs chants, including "No Justice, No Peace. No Ray(cist) Police."

As the event began, Orr introduced Kelly and acknowledged the protester's presence and their right to protest as well as stating that interrupting the lecture would be inappropriate. As Kelly began to speak, a number of audience members stood up and shouted a statement against racial profiling and the presence of the Commissioner. Students and community members continued interrupting the lecture with testimonies of racial profiling. Administrators asked the protesters in the audience to allow for the lecture to continue uninterrupted. Approximately 22 minutes into the event, the administration decided to cancel the lecture and clear out the room.

== Aftermath ==
Follow the event, Brown University President Christina H. Paxson released a public letter condemning the protest and cancellation of the lecture. The letter stated the sentiment "This is a sad day for the Brown community." Students in support of the protest initiated a letter writing campaign to Paxson in opposition to Kelly's presence. Other students developed a counter-campaign to support the lecture and support Paxson's response to the protest.

The University administration organized a community forum on October 30 for members of the Brown community to express concerns regarding the protest. Over 600 students, professors, and administrators attended. There was a wide range in opinions supporting and condemning racial profiling and the protest. Issues of freedom of speech and racial tensions on campus with also widely discussed.

On November 6, 2013, Paxson announced the creation of a committee to investigate the circumstances of the lecture and protest and make recommendations "regarding how the University community can maintain an inclusive and supportive environment for all of our students while upholding our deep commitment to the free exchange of ideas." The Committee on the Events of October 29, 2013 released their first report in February 2014 detailing the event. In May 2014, the Committee released their second report with findings and recommendations. President Paxson responded to the Committee's reports on September 24, 2014.

Some students were disciplined under the university's Student Code of Conduct as a result of the protest. The disciplinary action was criticized for not being widely publicized.
