= Islamic Resistance Support Organization =

The Islamic Resistance Support Organization (IRSO; Arabic: هيئة دعم المقاومة الإسلامية في لبنان Hay'at Da'am al-Muqawama al-Islamiya fi Lubnan) is a charity used to raise funds for Hezbollah and pay for the services it offers in Lebanon.

Hezbollah uses the IRSO to collect donations in support of its military activities. Specifically, the IRSO broadcasts advertisements on Hezbollah's al-Manar television station in support of the charity fund.

Leaflets distributed by the IRSO offer prospective different programs to choose from:

1. Monthly donations
2. Donations to martyrs' children and families
3. The Palestinian Jihad donation fund
4. Support a Fighter program
5. Equip a Fighter program
6. Donate the cost of a Rocket
7. Donate the cost of ammunition
8. Donations in kind for a fighter's basic needs

According to Stuart Levey, the U.S. Department of Treasury's Under Secretary for Terrorism and Financial Intelligence (TFI), "[the] IRSO's fundraising materials present donors with the option of sending funds to equip Hizballah [sic] fighters or to purchase rockets that Hizballah uses to target civilian populations." He also noted that "the IRSO works to inflict suffering rather than alleviate it." U.S. Executive Order 13224 shuts the IRSO out of the U.S. financial system by prohibiting transactions with the organization by persons of U.S. citizenship or persons residing in the U.S., as well as freezes any assets the IRSO may have under U.S. jurisdiction. It is designated by the US OFAC as a Specially Designated Global Terrorist group, which allows the US to block the assets of foreign individuals and entities that commit, or pose a significant risk of committing, acts of terrorism.

== Links ==
- http://www.moqawama.org - Official website of Islamic Resistance Support Organization, in Arabic, English, Spanish and French
