= Christopher Waller =

American economist and government official (born 1959)

Chris Waller
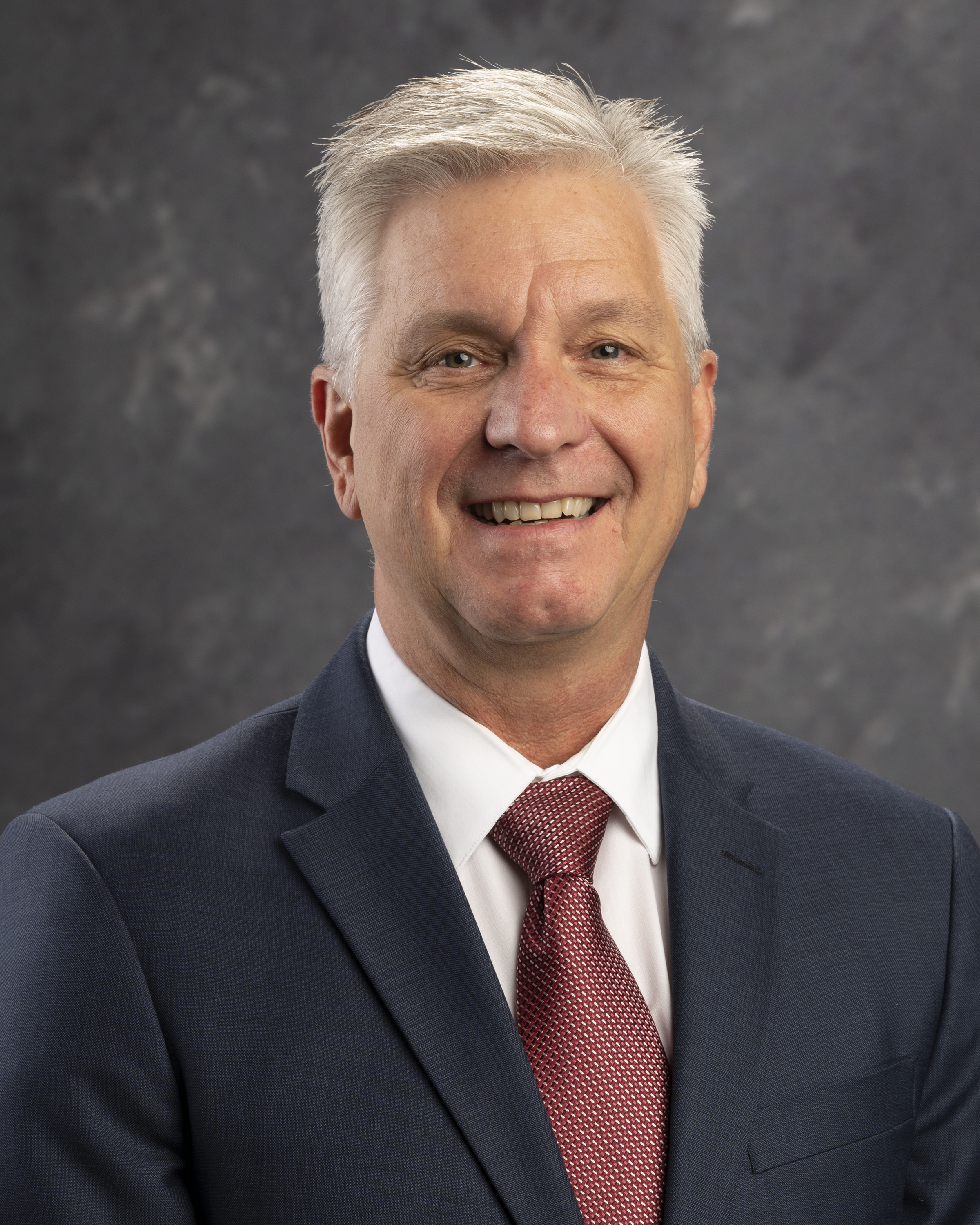
- Official portrait, 2022

Member of the Federal Reserve Board of Governors
- Incumbent
- Assumed office December 18, 2020
- President: Donald Trump; Joe Biden; Donald Trump
- Preceded by: Sarah Bloom Raskin

Personal details
- Born: Christopher J. Waller; 1959 (age 66–67)
- Party: Republican
- Education: Bemidji State University (BS); Washington State University, Pullman (MA, PhD)

Christopher J. Waller (born 1959) is an American economist who has been a member of the Federal Reserve Board of Governors since 2020. A nominee of President Donald Trump, he was confirmed by the Senate in December 2020 to serve through January 2030.

He previously served as the research director of and executive vice president at the Federal Reserve Bank of St. Louis. Waller's research has centered on monetary theory, political economy and macroeconomic theory.

== Early life and education ==
Waller was born in Nebraska City, Nebraska, in 1959. He spent his childhood in South Dakota and then Minnesota. Waller received a B.S. in economics from Bemidji State University in 1981 and an M.A. and Ph.D. from Washington State University in 1984 and 1985.

== Career ==
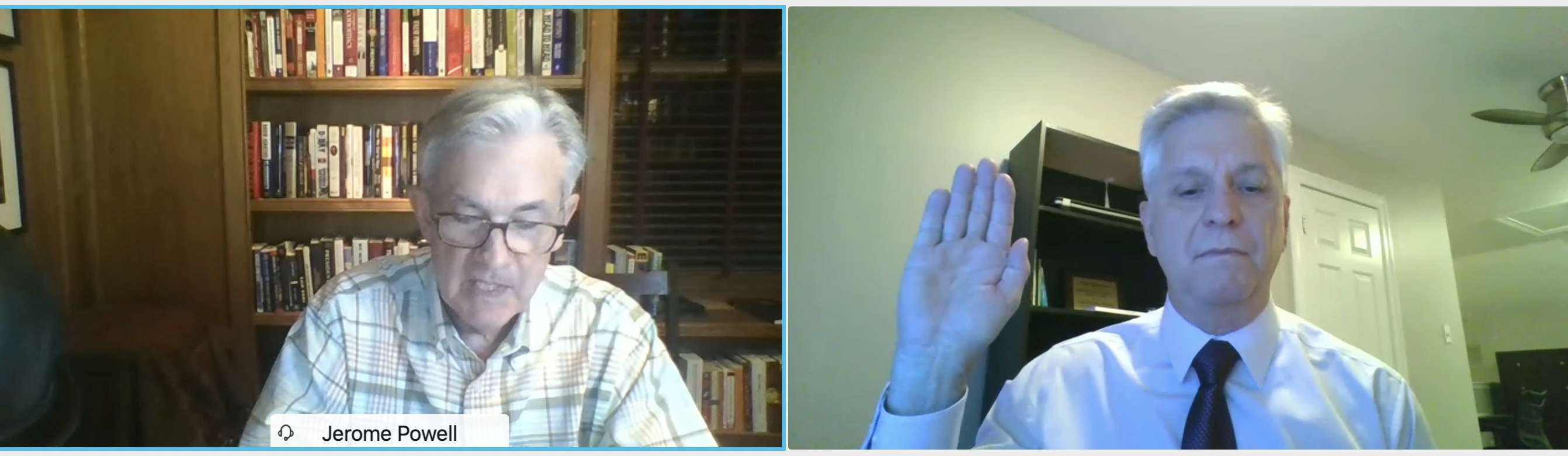
Waller (right) sworn in virtually as a member of the Federal Reserve Board of Governors by Chair Jerome Powell in December 2020. Waller was sworn in virtually due to precautions for the COVID-19 pandemic.

Waller worked at Indiana University's Department of Economics from 1985 to 1998, where he was an assistant professor, associate professor, and director of graduate studies. He was a visiting scholar at the Federal Reserve Bank of St. Louis and Washington University in St. Louis from 1994 to 1995. He taught economics at the University of Kentucky from 1998 to 2003 and was also a research fellow at the Center for European Integration Studies at the University of Bonn, in Germany. He was Gilbert F. Schaefer Chair of Economics at the University of Notre Dame from 2003 to 2011, on leave from 2009.

Waller joined the Federal Reserve Bank of St. Louis as research director in 2009. He was also executive vice president there. In that role, he helped make the St. Louis Fed’s Federal Reserve Economic Data (FRED) and Economic Education Program internationally recognized resources. He also fostered a close partnership with the department of economics at Washington University in St. Louis.

In July 2019, President Donald Trump tweeted his intent to nominate Waller and Judy Shelton to serve on the Federal Reserve Board of Governors.

After hearings in February 2020, the Senate Banking Committee voted 18–7 in July 2020 to advance Waller's Fed nomination. He was confirmed in the Senate on December 3, 2020, by a vote of 48–47. He took the oath of office remotely via videoconference on December 18 from Fed Chair Jerome Powell. His term will end January 31, 2030.

As of 2024, Waller serves on three committees of the Federal Reserve Board of Governors as a member of the Committee on Economic and Monetary Affairs, chair of the Committee on Federal Reserve Bank Affairs and Oversight Governor for RBOPS (Reserve Bank Operations and Payments Systems) and chair of the Committee on Clearing, Payments and Settlement.

In October 2025, United States Secretary of the Treasury Scott Bessent confirmed that Waller was on the short list of five candidates being considered by President Trump to replace Chair of the Federal Reserve Jerome Powell when his term ends in May 2026.

== Views ==
Waller's academic and policy research has centered on monetary theory, political economy and macroeconomic theory.

Shortly before and after joining the Federal Reserve Board of Governors, Waller was viewed as a monetary policy "dove", favoring expansionary policy and low interest rates. He worked closely with the St. Louis Federal Reserve bank's president, James B. Bullard, who was a vocal supporter of lower interest rates in 2019. in hindsight Waller argued that the Fed should not raise rates at that time (in 2019), when inflation was low and private savings were high. As inflation accelerated in 2021, though, Waller was an early advocate for tapering asset purchases, particularly purchases of mortgage-backed securities, to create policy space to increase interest rates in 2022.. However, In April, 2021 Waller argued that inflation is transitory and Fed should keep it's low interest rate policy and in hindsight that was a big mistake. In April 2022, he advocated aggressively raising the Federal Reserve's policy interest rate to contain inflation. The personal consumption expenditure measure of inflation, for which the Federal Reserve's target was 2% a year, was above 6% at the time. In July 2022, Waller and Federal Reserve Board staff member Andrew Figura issued a paper claiming that the U.S. economy could enjoy a "soft landing," with the unemployment rate rising only 1 percentage point or less as inflation declined from the levels of the time closer to the Federal Reserve's target level. A number of prominent economists contested that view, but as of 2024, it seemed that Figura and Waller were correct. As inflation came down in 2024, Waller supported reducing the Federal Reserve's policy rate.. On Nov 18,2026 Waller was on CNBC arguing for a 50 bps hike in order to "shock people", His evidence that inflation is “spreading” is that about 70% of core services are running above 3%, despite the fact that since 1968, core services CPI has averaged 4.77% and has been above 2% in 94.6% of months.

Waller has expressed skepticism about a central bank digital currency (CBDC) in the United States, saying that it is not clear what market failure in the U.S. payments system it would resolve. The following year, during The Clearing House Annual Conference 2024, he likened stablecoins to "synthetic" currency that could benefit the financial system by eliminating inefficiencies, but emphasized the need to address safety issues.

On August 28, 2025, Morningstar.com reported Waller agreed with President Trump interest-rate cuts and that the aggressive tariffs inflationary impact will be temporary and can be "looked through" by the Federal Reserve.

Waller opposed the mandatory inclusion in 2023 of climate risk management in financial institution planning, responding to the rescission of such standards in 2025 with the two-word statement, "Good riddance."

On November 18, 2026, Waller said Fed should consider a half-point interest rate increase in December or prepare for more hikes in 2027. He also noted that inflation was spreading in the services sector and that some businesses were getting used to raising prices by about 3% each year.

== See also ==
- Monetary policy

Government offices
Preceded by Sarah Bloom Raskin	Member of the Federal Reserve Board of Governors; 2020–present	Incumbent
