= Yousser Company for Finance and Investment =

- Industry: Finance and Insurance
- Headquarters: Lebanon
- Products: Financial services

Yousser Company for Finance and Investment is a bank that was part of the first Canadian lawsuit against a bank over terrorist funding.

== History ==
Yousser Company for Finance and Investment is used by Bayt al-Mal to secure loans and finance business deals for Hezbollah companies. The organization is located in Lebanon.

In September 2006, the United States said Bayt al-Mal and the Yousser Company for Finance and Investment served as a bank, creditor, and investment arm for Hezbollah and secured loans and financed business deals for Hezbollah. As of February 2007, Bayt al-Mal and Yousser Company bank accounts re-registered in the name of senior employees of Al-Qard al-Hassan. Further, after Bayt al-Mal's offices were damaged, in the summer 2006, Hezbollah moved some of its financial activity to Al-Qard al-Hassan. In September 2006, Panama suspended the bank's operations in their country.

According to Mr. Stuart Levey, U.S. Department of Treasury's Under Secretary for Terrorism and Financial Intelligence (TFI),"Yousser Company for Finance and Investment functions as Hezbollah's unofficial treasury, holding and investing its assets and serving as intermediaries between the terrorist group and mainstream banks."

On July 11, 2008, American Express Bank and the Lebanese Canadian Bank was sued, in New York, for being the correspondent bank to the Yousser Company for Finance and Investment and the Martyrs Foundation. In addition, Canadian citizens filed the first civil action as victims of Hezbollah rocket attacks in a Canadian court.

As of January 2020, it is still under sanctions.
