= Jim Johnson (New Jersey politician) =

American politician and attorney (born 1960)

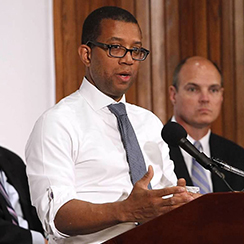

Corporation Counsel of New York City
- In office November 4, 2019 – June 4, 2021
- Mayor: Bill de Blasio
- Preceded by: Georgia Pestana (acting)
- Succeeded by: Georgia Pestana

United States Under Secretary of the Treasury for Enforcement
- In office 1998–2001
- President: Bill Clinton
- Preceded by: Raymond Kelly
- Succeeded by: Jimmy Gurulé

Personal details
- Born: James Edward Johnson; December 29, 1960 (age 65) Montclair, New Jersey, U.S.
- Party: Democratic
- Education: Harvard University (BA, JD)

James Edward Johnson (born December 29, 1960) is an American politician, attorney, and community activist, who was formerly an Assistant Secretary of the Treasury and Under Secretary of the Treasury for Enforcement, where he received the Hamilton Award, the Department of Treasury's highest award. He was a Democratic Party candidate in the 2017 New Jersey gubernatorial race.

Johnson also served as co-chair of the National Church Arson Task Force alongside former Massachusetts Governor Deval Patrick, chaired the board at the Brennan Center for Justice, co-founded the non-profit group New Jersey Communities Forward and was appointed as the federal affordable housing monitor in Westchester County, New York.

He formerly served as Corporation Counsel of the City of New York, one of the largest public legal offices in the country, with approximately 1,000 lawyers and 680 support professionals.

== Early life ==
Johnson was born in Montclair, New Jersey to Byerte W. Johnson and Edward James Johnson III and Chase Hilmes. Johnson graduated from Montclair Kimberley Academy in 1979, from which he later received a Distinguished Alumni Award. After MKA, Johnson attended Harvard College, where he received a B.A. in Social Studies and graduated cum laude in 1983. He also graduated cum laude from Harvard Law School, receiving his J.D. in 1986.

== Career ==
After law school, Johnson served as an Assistant United States Attorney in the Southern District of New York, successfully prosecuting a wide variety of criminal cases and rising to the Deputy Chief of the Criminal Division.

== Clinton administration ==
During the Clinton administration, Johnson held several senior positions in the United States Department of the Treasury. He began as the Assistant Secretary of the Treasury for Enforcement, during which President Bill Clinton asked him to co-chair the National Church Arson Task Force, formed in response to a wave of arsons reported at African American churches throughout the South. In 1998, Johnson became the Under Secretary of the Treasury for Enforcement, overseeing the operations of one third of federal law enforcement, including the United States Secret Service; the Bureau of Alcohol, Tobacco and Firearms, and the United States Customs Service. In total, Johnson oversaw approximately 29,000 employees and a $4.2 billion budget. In the wake of the Columbine High School Massacre, Johnson was one of the first officials on the ground and fought to close the gun-show loophole that contributed to the massacre. Johnson worked closely with Attorney General Eric Holder on the gun-show loophole issue.

== Community activism ==
After serving in the Clinton administration, Johnson returned to private practice as a partner at Debevoise & Plimpton. He subsequently chaired the Brennan Center for Justice at NYU School of Law, where he worked to protect the right to vote, reduce crime and incarceration and advocated for families facing foreclosure.

In 2006, Johnson led the State of New Jersey's Advisory Committee on Police Standards, formed to develop a set of proposals to ensure that the state trooper's progress in eliminating racial profiling became permanent. Johnson's work led to a revision the law that changed the relationship between state troopers and civilian leadership.

In 2009, Johnson was selected by a federal judge to oversee the settlement of an affordable housing conflict between the United States Department of Housing and Urban Development and Westchester County, NY. His task was to hold officials accountable for fulfilling the terms of the consent decree.

Since 2014, Johnson has brought together members of New Jersey's civil rights and law enforcement communities in a collaboration known as New Jersey Communities Forward – a project within the NJ Institute for Social Justice. NJCF contributed significantly to the new policies on police worn body cameras, independent shooting reviews and implicit bias training.

== 2017 New Jersey gubernatorial campaign ==
Johnson announced on October 31 that he was filing the paperwork necessary to become a candidate for Governor of New Jersey. He later named his campaign leadership team, which included Doug Rubin, former strategist for Deval Patrick and Elizabeth Warren, Bill Hyers, former campaign manager to Bill de Blasio and John del Cecato, one of President Obama's media strategists. Johnson has been critical of Republicans and Democrats in New Jersey, most recently on proposed legislation that would have given Gov. Christie the ability to sign a book deal. On January 10, Johnson announced that he was the first candidate to have reached the fundraising threshold necessary to qualify for public matching funds. Johnson called on his opponents to agree to a $15 million spending cap for the primary election, as the previous record for New Jersey Democratic gubernatorial primary spending was $6.7 million.

On June 6, 2017, Johnson lost the Democratic primary election to eventual election winner Phil Murphy, placing in second.

== Personal life ==
Johnson is married to Nancy Northup, the president of the Center for Reproductive Rights. The pair have four children, Natalie, Abby, Miles and Amalya.
