= Brian E. Nelson =

American lawyer

Brian Nelson
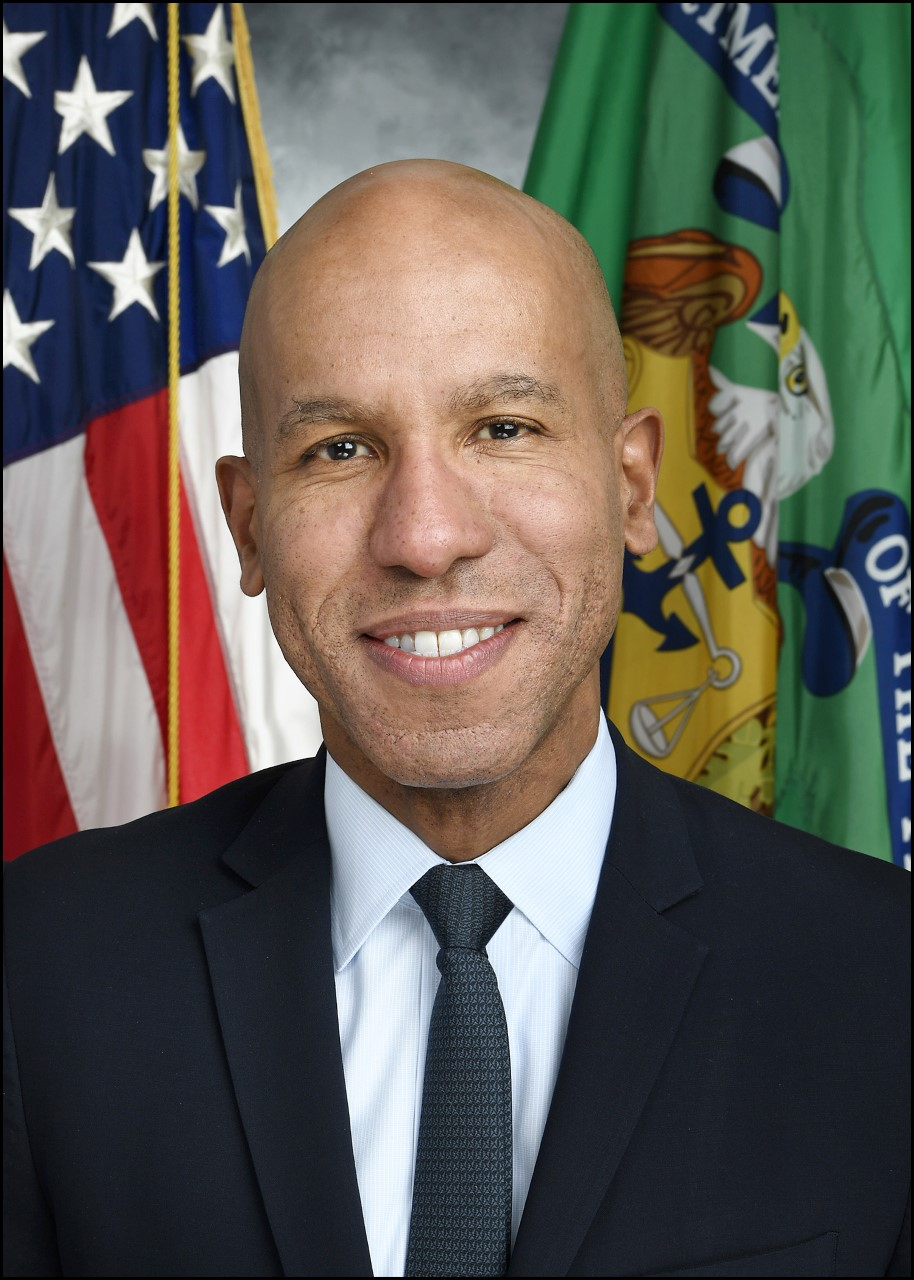

Under Secretary of the Treasury for Terrorism and Financial Intelligence
- In office December 16, 2021 – January 20, 2025
- President: Joe Biden
- Preceded by: Sigal Mandelker (2019)
- Succeeded by: John Hurley

Personal details
- Born: Brian Eddie Nelson
- Education: University of California, Los Angeles (BA); Yale University (JD)

Brian Eddie Nelson is an American attorney who served as Under Secretary of the Treasury for Terrorism and Financial Intelligence in the Biden administration from 2021 to 2025.

== Education ==
Nelson earned a Bachelor of Arts degree in Communications and American Literature from the University of California, Los Angeles and a Juris Doctor from Yale Law School in 2004.

== Career ==
After graduating from law school, Nelson clerked for judges Louis H. Pollak of the United States District Court for the Eastern District of Pennsylvania and William A. Fletcher of the United States Court of Appeals for the Ninth Circuit. From 2006 to 2009, he was an associate at Sidley Austin. From April 2009 to May 2010, Nelson was special counsel to the Assistant Attorney General for National Security. He later served as deputy chief of staff of the National Security Division. From 2011 to 2015, Nelson served in the California Department of Justice, first as special assistant attorney general and then as general counsel.

Since September 2017, Nelson has worked as chief legal advisor and corporate secretary for the 2028 Summer Olympics and Paralympic Games, scheduled to be hosted in Los Angeles.

Nelson had been considered a potential nominee for a federal judgeship in the Court of Appeals for the Ninth Circuit by President Joe Biden.

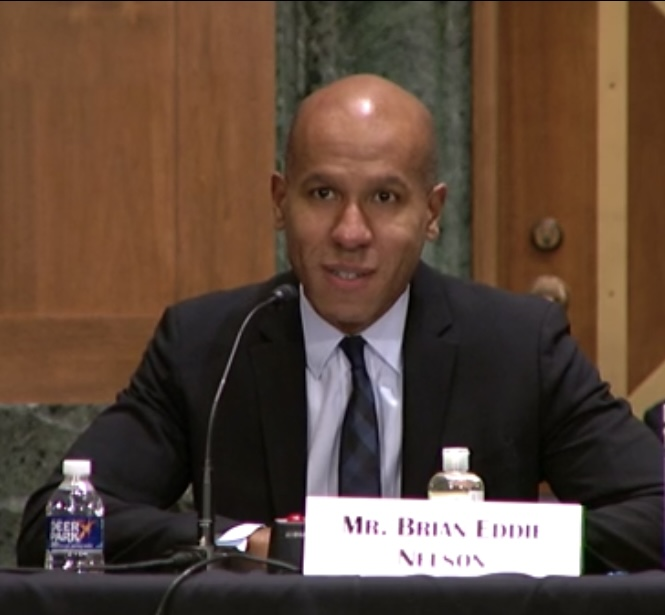
United States Senate Committee on Banking, Housing, and Urban Affairs hearing - June 22, 2021

=== Biden administration ===
On May 26, 2021, President Joe Biden nominated Nelson to serve as Under Secretary of the Treasury for Terrorism and Financial Intelligence. On June 22, 2021, the Senate's Banking Committee held hearings on Nelson's nomination. The committee deadlocked on his nomination on October 5, 2021, in a party-line vote. The entire Senate discharged his nomination from the committee on October 19, 2021, in a 50–49 vote. On December 2, 2021, Nelson was confirmed by the Senate in a 50–49 vote.

=== 2024 Kamala Harris presidential campaign ===
In July 2024, Nelson left his position with Treasury and joined Kamala Harris's 2024 presidential campaign as a senior adviser for policy.
