= David S. Cohen (attorney) =

American attorney (born 1963)

David Cohen
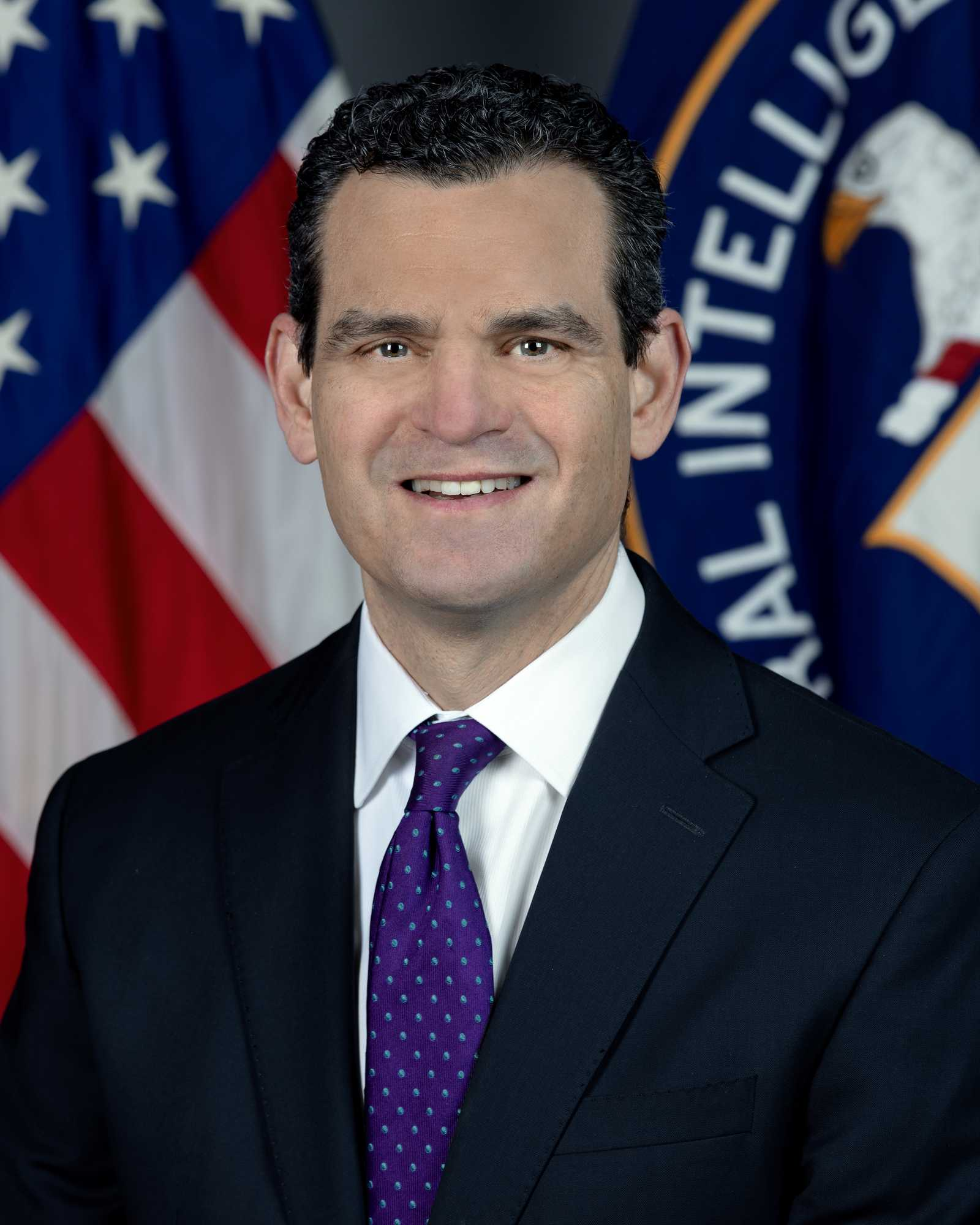
- Official portrait, 2021

5th and 8th Deputy Director of the Central Intelligence Agency
- In office January 20, 2021 – January 20, 2025
- President: Joe Biden
- Preceded by: Vaughn Bishop
- Succeeded by: Michael Ellis
- In office February 9, 2015 – January 20, 2017
- President: Barack Obama
- Preceded by: Avril Haines
- Succeeded by: Gina Haspel

Director of the Central Intelligence Agency
- Acting
- In office January 20, 2021 – March 19, 2021
- President: Joe Biden
- Preceded by: Gina Haspel
- Succeeded by: Bill Burns

Under Secretary of the Treasury for Terrorism and Financial Intelligence
- In office June 30, 2011 – February 9, 2015
- President: Barack Obama
- Preceded by: Stuart A. Levey
- Succeeded by: Sigal Mandelker

Assistant Secretary of the Treasury for Terrorist Financing
- In office May 1, 2009 – June 30, 2011
- President: Barack Obama
- Preceded by: Pat O'Brien
- Succeeded by: Daniel Glaser

Personal details
- Born: David Samuel Cohen; June 11, 1963 (age 63) Boston, Massachusetts, U.S.
- Spouse: Susan Hilary Friedman (m. 1989)
- Children: 2
- Education: Cornell University (BA); Yale University (JD)

David Samuel Cohen (born June 11, 1963) is an American attorney who served as deputy director of the Central Intelligence Agency (CIA) from 2021 to 2025, previously holding the position from February 9, 2015 to January 20, 2017. He served as acting director of the CIA from January 20 to March 19, 2021 until the Senate confirmation of William J. Burns.

Originally from Boston, Cohen previously worked at the U.S. Treasury Department and as an attorney in private practice. At the Treasury, among other posts, he served as the under secretary for terrorism and financial intelligence where he gained the nickname of "sanctions guru".

== Early life and education ==
Cohen was born on June 11, 1963, the son of a Jewish family doctor from Boston. He graduated from Cornell University in 1985 with a Bachelor of Arts in government and went on to receive a Juris Doctor from Yale Law School in 1989. After graduating from law school, Cohen served as a law clerk for federal judge Norman P. Ramsey for the U.S. District Court for the District of Maryland.

== Career ==
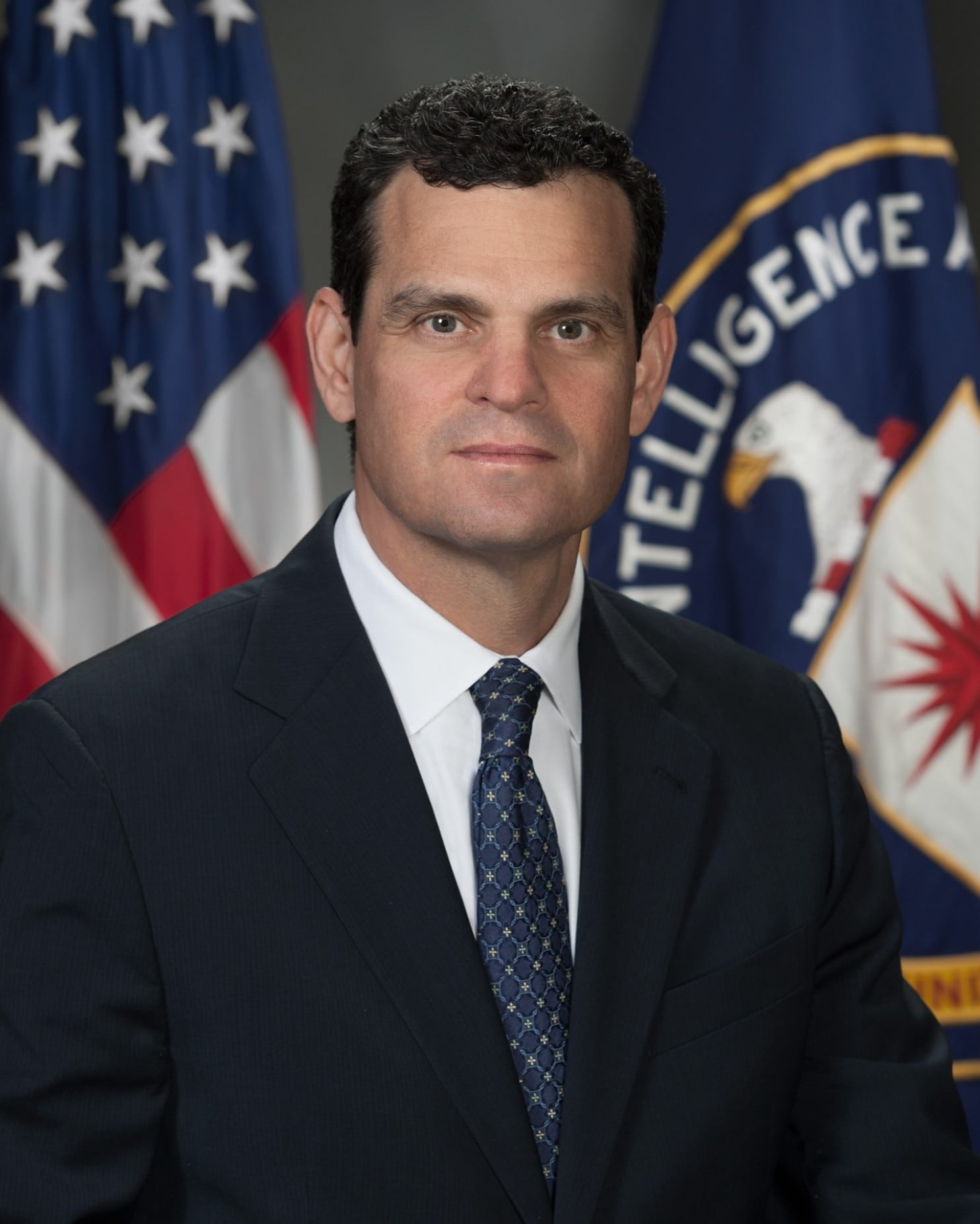
Official portrait, 2015

Following his clerkship, Cohen began his law career at the firm Miller, Cassidy, Larroca & Lewin, a “criminal-defense boutique” in Washington, D.C. He specialized in white-collar criminal defense and civil litigation. He was hired by the U.S. Treasury Department in 1999 as an aide to General Counsel Neal S. Wolin and then as Acting Deputy General Counsel. While there he was credited by department officials with "crafting legislation that formed the basis" of Title III of the USA PATRIOT Act, dealing with money laundering. In 2001 he left the government and joined the Washington law firm Wilmer Cutler Pickering Hale and Dorr, now known as WilmerHale. He practiced there for seven years, becoming partner in 2004. His practice areas included complex civil litigation, white-collar criminal defense, internal investigations, and anti-money laundering and sanctions compliance.

In 2009, President Barack Obama nominated Cohen to be Assistant Secretary for Terrorist Financing in the Treasury Department, and the U.S. Senate confirmed him on May 1, 2009. Variously described by members of the Obama administration as a "financial Batman" and one of the president's "favorite combatant commanders", he was, two years later, nominated and confirmed as Under Secretary of the Treasury for Terrorism and Financial Intelligence. In that role, he "preside[d] over a 700-person, $200 million-a-year counterterrorism office within Treasury that was created after the September 11, 2001, attacks" and includes the Office of Foreign Assets Control, which implements U.S. economic sanctions. During his Senate confirmation hearing, Cohen singled-out the government of Kuwait for rebuke, noting that "we have a real challenge with the Kuwaiti government. Kuwait is the only government in the Gulf Cooperation Council that does not criminalize terrorist financing." The following year, Cohen appeared as speaker at the annual forum of the Foundation for Defense of Democracies.

In 2015, Cohen was appointed Deputy Director of the Central Intelligence Agency. At the time of his appointment, some speculated that Cohen's selection was due to the Obama administration's reluctance in picking someone with ties to past incidences of CIA torture and extraordinary rendition. The post of deputy director has traditionally been filled by military officers or intelligence community veterans.

== Personal life ==
Cohen married Susan Hilary Friedman on August 6, 1989, whom he met while in law school. The couple has two children.

In May 2019, Cohen had a cameo role in Season 8, Episode 2 of Game of Thrones.
