= Sigal Mandelker =

American lawyer (born 1971)

Sigal P. Mandelker
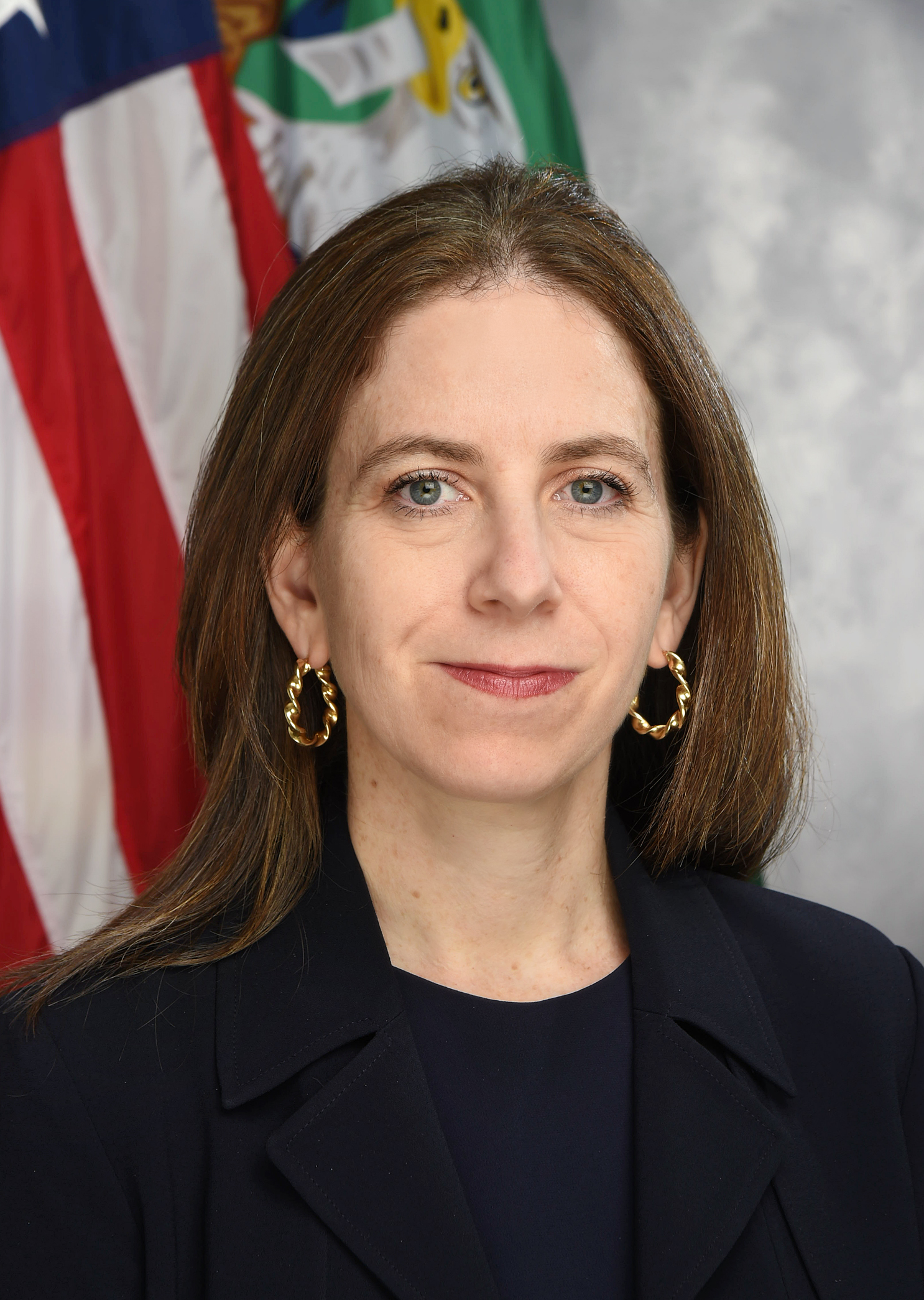

United States Deputy Secretary of the Treasury
- Acting; June 26, 2017 – December 12, 2018
- President: Donald Trump
- Preceded by: Sarah Bloom Raskin
- Succeeded by: Justin Muzinich

Under Secretary of the Treasury for Terrorism and Financial Intelligence
- In office June 26, 2017 – October 3, 2019
- President: Donald Trump
- Preceded by: Adam Szubin (acting)
- Succeeded by: Brian E. Nelson

Personal details
- Born: Sigal Pearl Mandelker; 1971 (age 54–55) Chicago, Illinois, U.S.
- Education: University of Michigan (BA); University of Pennsylvania (JD)
- Occupation: Attorney

Sigal Pearl Mandelker (born 1971) is an American lawyer who served as Under Secretary of the Treasury for Terrorism and Financial Intelligence from 2017 to 2019. In October 2019, she stepped down from the position to pursue opportunities in the private sector. Mandelker subsequently joined Silicon Valley investment firm Ribbit Capital as a General Partner.

== Early life and education ==
A child of Holocaust survivors, Mandelker was born in Chicago, Illinois. She received her B.A. from the University of Michigan in 1993 and her J.D. from the University of Pennsylvania Law School in 2000.

== Career ==
Mandelker was a law clerk for Edith Jones at the U.S. Court of Appeals for the Fifth Circuit and Clarence Thomas at the Supreme Court of the United States. She worked in the U.S. Attorney's Office for the Southern District of New York as Assistant U.S. Attorney before becoming Counsel to the Deputy Attorney General, where she worked on national security and counterterrorism. She was Counselor to the Secretary of Homeland Security before she worked in the Criminal Division of the Department of Justice as Deputy Assistant Attorney General.

=== Department of Justice ===
In 2008, while in the criminal division of the Department of Justice, Mandelker was part of the team of high ranking DOJ officials who agreed not to pursue federal charges against sexual predator Jeffrey Epstein. The deal allowed Epstein to spend only about a year in jail and plead guilty only to state crimes, avoiding federal charges entirely. Victims have long claimed that federal agreement not to prosecute Epstein violated their rights by not informing them of the plea deal. This matter is currently pending appeal before the 11th U.S. Circuit Court of Appeals. In 2019, Epstein was later brought up on federal charges and charged with sexually abusing dozens of children.

=== Private Practice ===
Mandelker was a partner at Proskauer Rose before leaving in 2017.

=== Under Secretary of the Treasury ===
In March 2017, President Donald Trump nominated Mandelker for the position of Under Secretary of the Treasury for Terrorism and Financial Intelligence. She was confirmed by the United States Senate with a vote of 96–4 on June 21, 2017.

Mandelker played a significant role in the Trump administration's Iran policy, overseeing the implementation of financial sanctions against Iran and financial crime enforcement against Iran. Mandelker was one of the Trump administration's "most hawkish members on Iran."

Mandelker drew bipartisan praise for her work applying new authorities given to the Treasury Department, through The Global Magnitsky Human Rights Accountability Act, to sanction individuals and entities responsible for human rights violations or acts of significant corruption. Included in these sanctions were those applied in 2017 and again in 2018 against billionaire Dan Gertler and his companies as a result of his "opaque and corrupt" mining and oil deals in the Congo. These sanctions severely limited his global business acumen as he was refused access to the US banking system and other financial institutions concerned with violating American law.

In October 2019, Mandelker stepped down from this position to pursue opportunities in the private sector. She was succeeded by Justin Muzinich as acting Under Secretary for Terrorism and Financial Intelligence.

== Memberships ==
Mandelker is a member of the New York City, New York State, and American Bar Associations, as well as the Federalist Society. She is also a member of the United States Holocaust Memorial Museum Council.

== Personal life ==
Mandelker lives in New York.

== See also ==
- List of law clerks for the tenth seat of the Supreme Court of the United States

Political offices
Preceded by Sarah Bloom Raskin	United States Deputy Secretary of the Treasury; Acting; 2017–2018	Succeeded by Justin Muzinich
