= Office of Terrorist Financing and Financial Crimes =

United States Department of the Treasury agency

The Office of Terrorist Finance and Financial Crimes (TFFC) is an agency of the United States federal government in the United States Department of the Treasury. Under the supervision of the Under Secretary for Terrorism and Financial Intelligence, the TFFC is policy development and outreach office for the Under Secretary and works across all elements of the national security community – including the law enforcement, regulatory, policy, diplomatic and intelligence communities – and with the private sector and foreign governments to identify and address the threats presented by all forms of illicit finance to the international financial system.

TFFC advances this mission by developing initiatives and strategies to deploy the full range of financial authorities to combat money laundering, terrorist financing, WMD proliferation, and other criminal and illicit activities both at home and abroad. These include not only systemic initiatives to enhance the transparency of the international financial system, but also threat-specific strategies and initiatives to apply and implement targeted financial measures to the full range of national security threats. Primary examples of these roles in advancing this mission is TFFC’s leadership of the U.S. government delegation to the Financial Action Task Force, which has developed leading global standards for combating money laundering and terrorist financing and its role in specific efforts to counter threats like proliferation, terrorism and the deceptive financial practices of Iran.
