= Under Secretary of the Treasury for Terrorism and Financial Intelligence =

Position in US treasury

- Flag of an Under Secretary of the Treasury
- Incumbent; Gene Lange (acting) since April 28, 2026
- Department of the Treasury
- Style: The Honorable
- Reports to: Secretary of the Treasury; Deputy Secretary of the Treasury
- Nominator: President of the United States
- Precursor: Under Secretary of the Treasury for Enforcement
- Salary: $183,300 (2021)
- Website: Official website

The Under Secretary for Terrorism and Financial Intelligence is a position within the United States Department of the Treasury responsible for directing the Treasury's efforts to cut the lines of financial support for terrorists, fight financial crime, enforce economic sanctions against rogue nations, and combat the financial support of the proliferation of weapons of mass destruction. The Under Secretary is appointed by the president and confirmed by the Senate.

As of July 2026, the Under Secretary is John K. Hurley, who was appointed by President Donald Trump, and confirmed to the position by the Senate on July 23, 2025.

== Overview ==
The Under Secretary heads the Office of Terrorism and Financial Intelligence (TFI), created under 31 USC 312, when the administration of President George W. Bush announced, on May 8, 2004, that the Executive Office of Terrorist Financing and Financial Crimes (TFFC), the Financial Crimes Enforcement Network (FinCEN), the Office of Foreign Assets Control (OFAC), and allocated resources from the Treasury Department would be brought under the new office's control. The Under Secretary for Terrorism and Financial Intelligence also possesses oversight of the Office of Intelligence and Analysis, created under 31 USC 311, [one of sixteen agencies in the United States Intelligence Community per 50 USC 3003].

== History ==
The position's predecessor, the Under Secretary for Enforcement, managed law enforcement aspects of the Department prior to the reorganization. The Under Secretary for Enforcement provided oversight and policy guidance for the Bureau of Alcohol, Tobacco and Firearms, the U.S. Customs Service, the Federal Law Enforcement Training Center; the Financial Crimes Enforcement Network, the U.S. Secret Service, the Executive Office for Asset Forfeiture, and the Office of Foreign Assets Control. The Under Secretary also provided policy guidance over the Internal Revenue Service's Criminal Investigation Division.

Several of these agencies are now non-existent or have been moved into other federal departments. The Bureau of Alcohol, Tobacco, and Firearms was split into two separate bureaus, with one handling certain law enforcement aspects and the other handling tax collection aspects. The former was moved into the United States Department of Justice, while the latter was kept within the Department of the Treasury. The U.S. Secret Service and the Federal Law Enforcement Training Center are now within the Department of Homeland Security. The U.S. Customs Service was moved into the Department of Homeland Security when it became part of the U.S. Customs and Border Protection. However, under the Homeland Security Act of 2002 Custom Service's "revenue functions" were retained by Treasury. This includes, among others, Customs duties, enforcing trade agreements, and counterfeit trademark detection and seizure.

== Former under secretaries ==
Former under secretaries include Jimmy Gurule, James Johnson, Raymond Kelly, Ronald Noble, Stuart A. Levey, David Cohen and Sigal Mandelker and Brian E. Nelson. Adam Szubin was appointed Under Secretary under the Obama administration but was never confirmed by the Senate.

== See also ==
- Financial Transactions and Reports Analysis Centre of Canada
