= Sarah Bloom Raskin =

American attorney (born 1961)

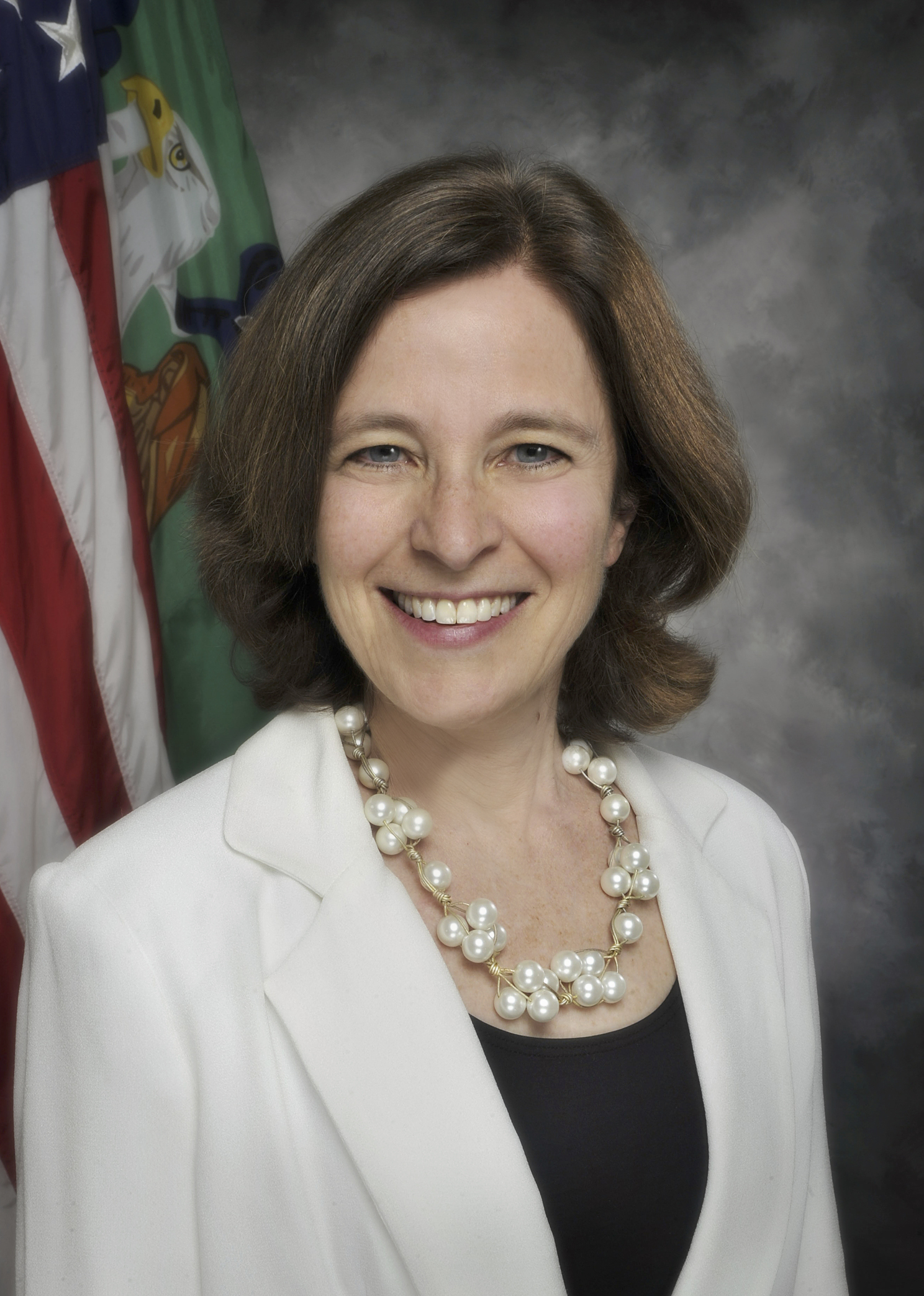
- Official portrait, 2014

13th United States Deputy Secretary of the Treasury
- In office March 19, 2014 – January 20, 2017
- President: Barack Obama
- Preceded by: Mary J. Miller (acting)
- Succeeded by: Justin Muzinich

Member of the Federal Reserve Board of Governors
- In office October 4, 2010 – March 13, 2014
- President: Barack Obama
- Preceded by: Donald Kohn
- Succeeded by: Christopher Waller

Personal details
- Born: Sarah Bloom; April 15, 1961 (age 65) Medford, Massachusetts, U.S.
- Party: Democratic
- Spouse: Jamie Raskin (m. 1990)
- Children: 3 (Note: One child is deceased.)
- Education: Amherst College (BA); Harvard University (JD)

Sarah Bloom Raskin (born April 15, 1961) is an American attorney and former government official who served as the 13th United States Deputy Secretary of the Treasury from 2014 to 2017. Raskin previously served as a member of the Federal Reserve Board of Governors from 2010 to 2014. She also was Maryland Commissioner of Financial Regulation. She was a Rubenstein Fellow at Duke University. She is currently the Colin W. Brown Distinguished Professor of the Practice of Law at Duke Law School. She is also a Senior Fellow at the Duke Center on Risk. She also serves as a Partner at Kaya Partners, Ltd., a climate advisory firm.

== Early life and education ==
Sarah Bloom was born in Medford, Massachusetts in a Jewish family, the daughter of Arlene (née Perlis) and Herbert Bloom. Bloom attended Homewood-Flossmoor High School in Flossmoor, Illinois, where she graduated in 1979.

After graduating from high school, she went on to Amherst College where she graduated magna cum laude and Phi Beta Kappa with a Bachelor of Arts in economics in 1983, and wrote her undergraduate thesis on monetary policy. She received her Juris Doctor from Harvard Law School in 1986. Raskin was honored with an honorary Doctorate of Humane Letters by Muhlenberg College on May 19, 2019.

== Career ==
=== Government service ===
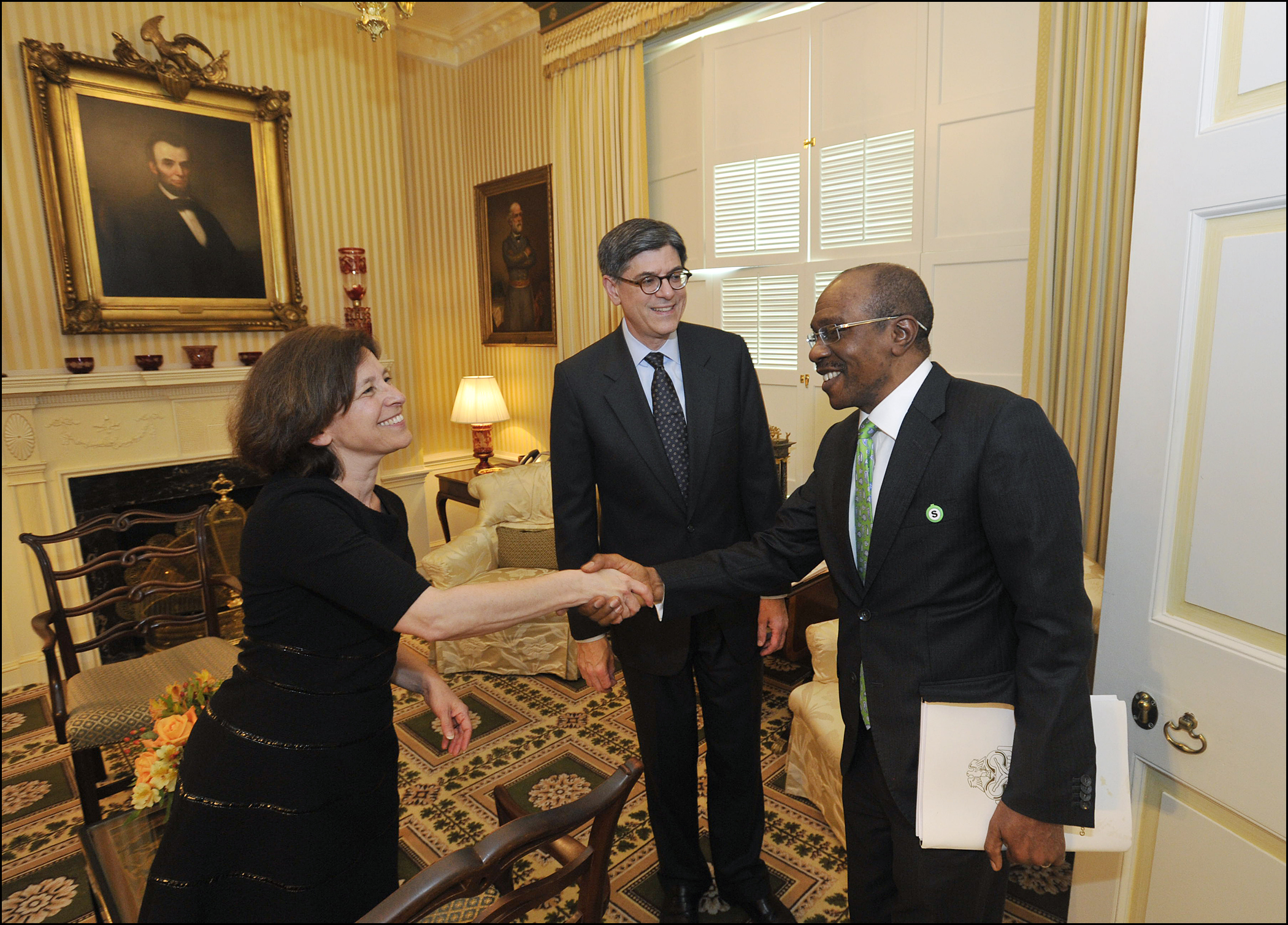
Bloom Raskin meets with Central Bank of Nigeria governor Godwin Emefiele

Raskin worked as an associate at Arnold & Porter and as counsel for the Senate Banking Committee. Prior to serving as commissioner, she was a managing director at the Promontory Financial Group. Raskin also served as chief financial regulator for Maryland.

President Barack Obama nominated Raskin to the Federal Reserve Board along with fellow nominees Dr. Janet Yellen, president of the Federal Reserve Bank of San Francisco, and Peter A. Diamond, MIT institute professor of economics. Raskin and Yellen were unanimously confirmed as Federal Reserve Board governors by the United States Senate on September 30, 2010. On October 4, 2010, both were sworn in by Fed Chairman Ben Bernanke. As a member of the Federal Reserve Board, Raskin gained a reputation as someone focused on consumer protection and income inequality.

On July 31, 2013, President Barack Obama announced that he would nominate Raskin to the second-in-command position of deputy secretary at the United States Department of the Treasury. She was confirmed to the position on March 12, 2014, by a voice vote. Upon confirmation, Raskin became the highest-ranked woman in the history of the Treasury Department at that time. Raskin was sworn in on March 19, 2014. Upon her confirmation as deputy secretary, she resigned as a member of the Board of Governors of the Federal Reserve System on March 13, 2014. Raskin was the first woman to be confirmed to serve as deputy secretary. While serving her term, Raskin had a special focus on the macroeconomic impact of student loan borrowing and cyber security.

=== Post-government career ===
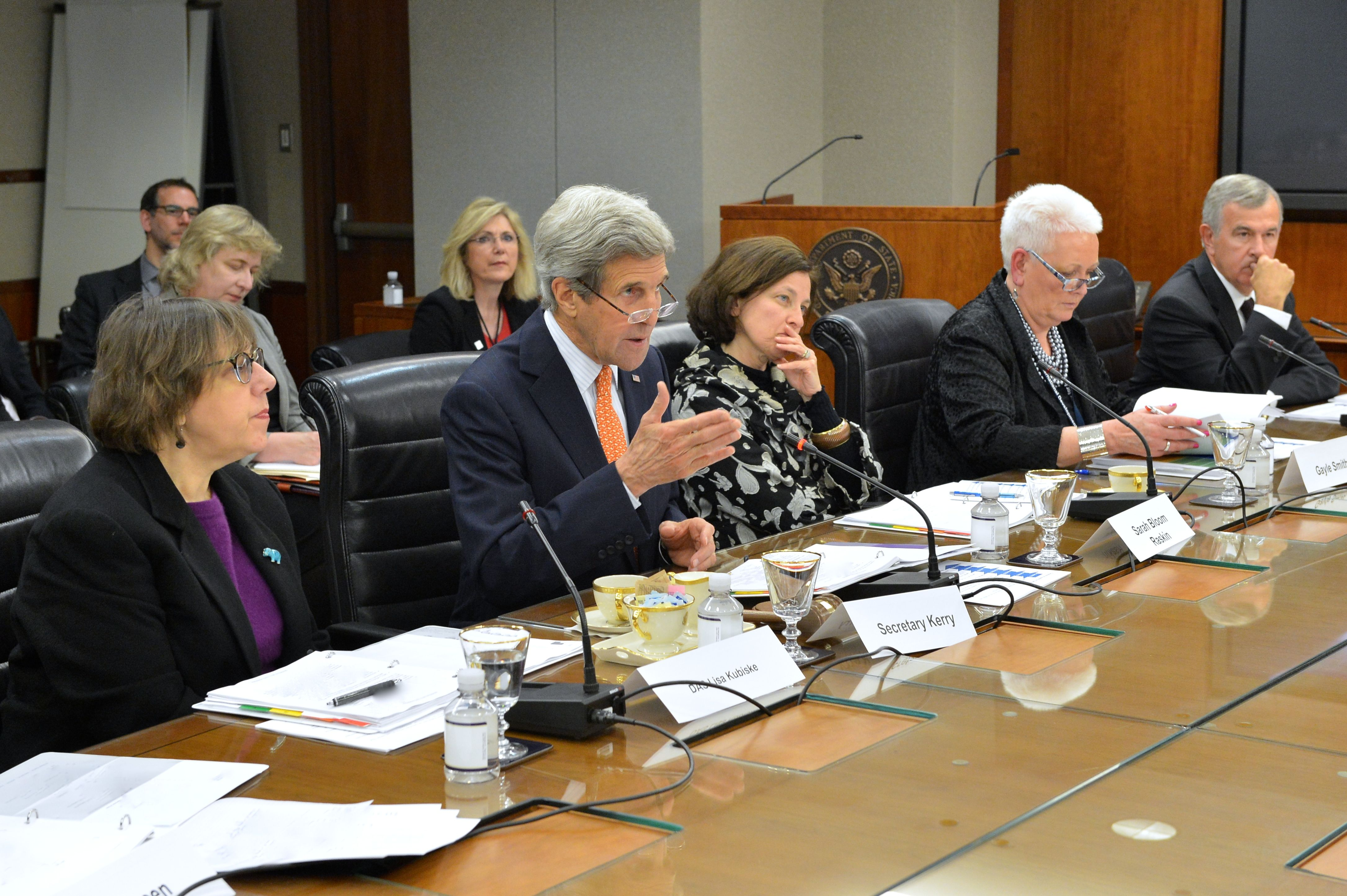
Bloom Raskin with John Kerry at a Millennium Challenge Corporation Board Meeting (26005947912)

During the 2017–2018 academic year, Raskin was a distinguished visiting professor at the University of Maryland Francis King Carey School of Law. During the 2018–2019 and 2019–2020 academic years, Raskin was a Rubenstein Fellow at Duke University. As a Rubenstein Fellow, she worked closely with the Rethinking Regulation program at Duke's Kenan Institute for Ethics and with the Global Financial Markets Center at Duke Law School to improve the public's understanding of markets and regulation. In particular, she led a research agenda that sought to shape a new relationship between regulation and resilience in financial markets. It also explored opportunities to harness cyber-data and turn it into a public asset rather than a liability.

In November 2020, Raskin was reported to be under consideration for secretary of the treasury in the Biden administration. In 2021, she was mentioned as a potential candidate to lead the Office of the Comptroller of the Currency (OCC).

=== Second Federal reserve nomination ===
On January 14, 2022, Raskin was nominated by the Biden administration to serve as vice chairwoman for banking supervision at the Federal Reserve Board of Governors. Hearings were held before the Senate Banking Committee on February 3, 2022. Her nomination was opposed by Republican lawmakers, who boycotted a committee vote to advance her nomination to the entire Senate.

On March 14, Democratic senator Joe Manchin indicated that he would not support Raskin's nomination, which was seen as "potentially dooming her chances for confirmation". On March 15, at her request, the Biden administration withdrew the nomination. In her letter to President Biden, Raskin stated that it was her "considered view that the perils of climate change must be added to the list of serious risks that the Federal Reserve considers as it works to ensure the stability and resiliency of our economy and financial system."

President Biden blamed Raskin's defeat on "baseless attacks from industry and conservative interest groups."

== Personal life ==
Raskin is married to Jamie Raskin, a member of the U.S. House of Representatives from Maryland's 8th congressional district, and as of 2006 lived in the town of Takoma Park, Maryland.

Raskin and her husband have two adult daughters, Hannah and Tabitha. On December 31, 2020, Raskin's office announced that their son Thomas (Tommy), a graduate of Amherst College and a second-year student at Harvard Law School, committed suicide at the age of 25. On January 4, 2021, Raskin and her husband posted a tribute online which stated that Thomas had died after a prolonged battle with depression.

== Notes ==
Government offices
Preceded by Donald Kohn	Member of the Federal Reserve Board of Governors; 2010–2014	Succeeded by Christopher Waller
Political offices
Preceded by Mary J. Miller; Acting	United States Deputy Secretary of the Treasury; 2014–2017	Succeeded by Justin Muzinich
