= Stuart A. Levey =

American government official

Stuart Levey
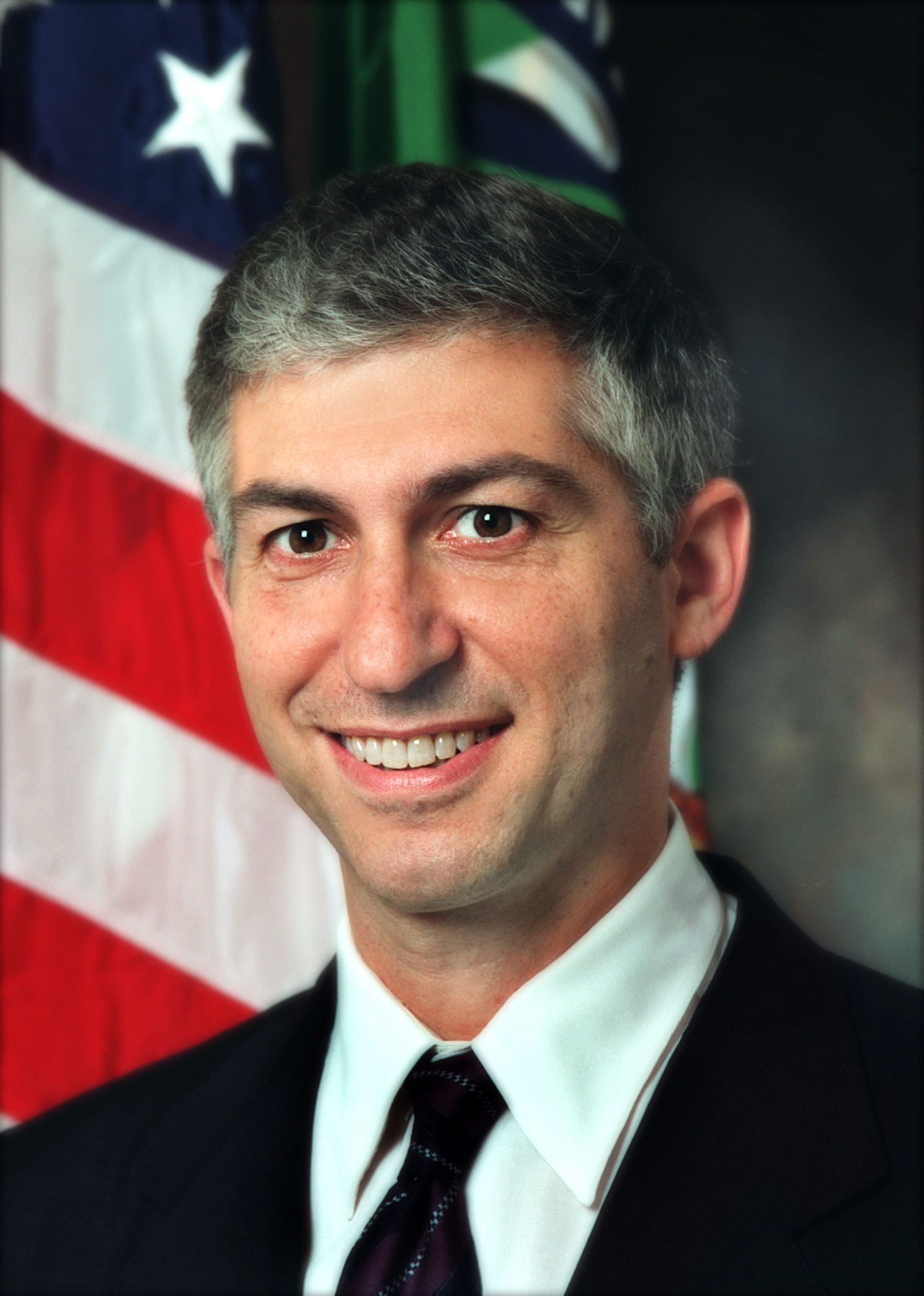

United States Secretary of the Treasury
- Acting
- In office January 20, 2009 – January 26, 2009
- President: Barack Obama
- Preceded by: Henry Paulson
- Succeeded by: Timothy Geithner

Under Secretary of the Treasury for Terrorism and Financial Intelligence
- In office July 20, 2004 – June 30, 2011
- President: George W. Bush; Barack Obama
- Preceded by: Position established
- Succeeded by: David S. Cohen

Personal details
- Education: Harvard College; Harvard Law School

Stuart A. Levey is a business executive, who previously held a number of political positions in the US government. He was the first Under Secretary for Terrorism and Financial Intelligence within the United States Department of the Treasury. He was sworn in on July 21, 2004 as a political appointee of President George W. Bush. President Barack Obama asked Levey to remain in his position and Levey was one of only a small number of Senate-confirmed Bush appointees who served in the Obama Administration.

In the mid-2000s, he was credited with "helping to bring Iran to the negotiating table on nuclear power" by tough enforcement of financial sanctions. After leaving the government, Levey joined the private sector. In January 2012, Levey joined HSBC as the bank's Chief Legal Officer. In August 2020, he became CEO of the Diem Association. On November 10, 2022, Oracle Corporation announced Levey as executive vice president and chief legal officer.

== Early life and education ==
Stuart Levey grew up in a Jewish family near Akron, Ohio, where his father had practiced dentistry. Levey attended Harvard College, graduating summa cum laude in 1986, and in 1989 he graduated magna cum laude from Harvard Law School.

== Career ==
=== Early law and government positions ===
After law school, Levey clerked for Judge Laurence Silberman on the U.S. Court of Appeals for the D.C. Circuit from 1989 through 1990. Prior to joining the Justice Department in 2001, Levey spent 11 years in private practice at the Washington law firm Miller, Cassidy, Larroca & Lewin LLP (which merged into Baker Botts LLP). He had a litigation practice with a special emphasis on white collar criminal defense.

Beginning in 2001, Levey served in several senior positions in the U.S. Department of Justice, including as Principal Associate Deputy Attorney General for Deputy Attorney General Larry Thompson and Deputy Attorney General James Comey. In that role, Levey was the Deputy Attorney General's primary advisor for coordinating the Department's counterterrorism and national security activities, including investigations, intelligence collection and prosecutions. Prior to serving in that role, Levey was an associate deputy attorney general and chief of staff to the deputy attorney general.

Levey was sworn in on July 21, 2004 as the Under Secretary of Terrorism and Financial Intelligence at the U.S. Department of the Treasury in the administration of President George W. Bush. President Barack Obama asked Levey to remain in his position and Levey was one of only a small number of Senate-confirmed Bush appointees who served in the Obama Administration. Levey served until March 2011. He was succeeded by David S. Cohen.

=== Under Secretary for Terrorism and Financial Intelligence ===
As the first Under Secretary of the Treasury for Terrorism and Financial Intelligence (TFI), from July 2004, Levey was responsible for creating a new office to lead the Treasury Department's revitalized post-9/11 national security mission. Levey is credited with developing and executing financial strategies to counter threats to U.S. national security and protect the integrity of the international financial system. He has also been recognized for leading the U.S. government's efforts to disrupt financial networks supporting terrorist organizations; developing and implementing financial measures against proliferators of weapons of mass destruction; and playing a central role in U.S. strategies to pressure the regimes in North Korea, Iran and Libya. He is credited, in particular, with designing the financial strategy that resulted in tremendous pressure on Iran's economy and its isolation from the international financial system.

One of Levey's key initiatives was harnessing the private sector to enhance the effectiveness of government-imposed financial measures. He "led an effort to convince foreign banks to cease conducting business with Iran until that country agreed to comply with international banking standards. By showing companies and banks that doing business in Iran has financial and diplomatic repercussions, he has convinced corporations to cut off business with Iran." TFI's efforts received support from both Republicans and Democrats. Levey, an appointee of the George W. Bush administration, was asked to remain in his position by the Obama Administration.

TFI, through its implementation of economic sanctions and other financial measures, put pressure on the regimes in North Korea, Iran, and Libya. TFI was responsible for leading the U.S. government's efforts to cut off financing to terrorist organizations such as al-Qaeda, Hamas and Hezbollah. In pursuing that effort against al Qaeda, Levey focused attention on wealthy Gulf-based donors, particularly from Saudi Arabia. He was once quoted as saying,"If I could somehow snap my fingers and cut off the funding from one country, it would be Saudi Arabia." No one identified by the United States and the United Nations as a terror financier has been prosecuted by the Saudis, he elaborated. He later acknowledged significant improvement in the partnership between the U.S. and Saudi Arabia in targeting al-Qaeda financing.

In June 2006, the New York Times reported that counterterrorism officials had gained access to financial records from a vast international database of banking transactions involving Americans and others in the United States. In response to concerns about privacy issues, Levey said that the Terrorist Financing Tracking Program (TFTP) "has provided us with a unique and powerful window into the operations of terrorist networks and is, without doubt, a legal and proper use of our authorities." Since the creation of the TFTP, the United States and European Union (EU) have entered into a long-standing and comprehensive information sharing agreement to thwart the financing of terrorism around the world and gain timely, accurate, and reliable information about activities associated with suspected acts of terrorist planning and financing. A 2019 EU evaluation of the TFTP found that “over 70,000 leads were generated, some of which brought forward investigations into terrorist attacks on EU territory, such as those in Stockholm, Barcelona, and Turku. The number of leads increased considerably compared to almost 9,000 in the previous reporting period (1 March 2014 to 31 December 2015).” In November 2020, the Wall Street Journal reported that EU member countries widely use the TFTP to monitor global financial ties to terrorism and thwart terrorist actors.

In July 2010, Levey said that Anwar al-Awlaki "has proven that he is extraordinarily dangerous, committed to carrying out deadly attacks on Americans and others worldwide ... [and] has involved himself in every aspect of the supply chain of terrorism—fundraising for terrorist groups, recruiting and training operatives, and planning and ordering attacks on innocents."

==== Stance on Iranian sanctions ====
According to The New York Times, the failure of the United States to carry out sanctions against many Iranian companies and individuals is cited by European diplomats as an example of America failing to do what it has promised. Valerie Lincy of Iran Watch has said, "The United States now lags many other countries in enforcing sanctions that the United Nations has already voted." The Tehran Times wrote that the U.S. Treasury has increased pressure on foreign banks not to deal with sanctions against Iran, including performing "U-turn transactions," which allow U.S. banks to process payments involving Iran that begin and end with a non-Iranian foreign bank.

In reply to Lincy's comments, Levey said that the United States has tougher sanctions on Iran than any other country. He said that because their list of organizations and individuals involved in financial crime is accurate, it is America's list that "is by and large used by financial institutions around the world."

=== Acting Treasury Secretary ===
On January 15, 2009 President-elect Barack Obama designated Levey to serve as Acting Treasury Secretary until Obama nominee Timothy Geithner was confirmed to the post. Geithner was confirmed on January 26.

=== Chief Legal Officer, HSBC Holdings plc ===
After leaving the U.S. Department of the Treasury, Levey became Chief Legal Officer and a Group Managing Director of HSBC Holdings plc, an international bank with 257,000 employees in 2014. Levey joined HSBC in 2012 as the bank was seeking to resolve investigations into past anti-money laundering and sanctions compliance failures. Levey led a legal department made up of more than 800 lawyers in more than 50 countries. In a speech to The Economist’s General Counsel summit, Levey said that helping a business navigate the external environment requires its senior lawyers to be conscious not only of what the law is in any particular jurisdiction, but also of how the law might evolve in the future. In May of 2016, Levey wrote an op-ed in the Wall Street Journal in response to an effort by then-Secretary of State John Kerry to persuade major non-US banks to do business with Iran. In the op-ed, Levey stated that HSBC’s “decisions will be driven by the financial-crime risks and the underlying conduct,” and “[f]or these reasons, HSBC has no intention of doing any new business involving Iran.”

Upon Levey’s departure from HSBC in 2020, HSBC chief executive Noel Quinn sent an email to staff praising Levey's tenure, stating Levey “was a driving force behind the bank’s transformation in how we fight financial crime and helped us to rebuild our reputation, as well as the trust of our regulators and other government stakeholders.” Stuart Gulliver, the former chief executive of HSBC, said that Levey was “the most important key hire” he made during his tenure.

=== Diem Association CEO ===
In May 2020, Levey was appointed the CEO of the Diem Association, a member-based association backed by Facebook that was building a blockchain-based payment system. Levey by late 2021 was also the CEO of Diem Networks US. He started the new job in July 2020 out of Washington, DC. In May 2020, the Financial Times reported that Levey was reviewing Diem's plans for financial crime compliance and other controls to protect user privacy. On becoming the CEO, Levey said that Diem would help underbanked and unbanked people, with strong controls in place to detect and deter illegal financial activity. Speaking to the American Banker in May 2021, Levey said “I personally want to build a project that has the type of financial crime controls that can even go beyond the effectiveness of the traditional banking system.” Under Levey, by May 2021, the Diem Association had been modifying the project by incorporating feedback from regulators.

The Libra project was ready to test its Diem stablecoin in the spring of 2021, and on the brink of approval from the Swiss Financial Market Supervisory Authority (Finma). However, the final approval needed by the US Treasury was refused, with the Biden administration requesting a delay to examine the project further. Under Levey, the project was then relocated from Switzerland to the US, and the Fed and Treasury were informed a launch was scheduled for June 29, 2021. The night beforehand, the US withheld approval. Subsequently, Levey's attempts to schedule meetings with Treasury officials were ignored. The Diem project was cancelled in January 2022, and Silvergate Capital purchased Diem's technology assets on January 31, 2022 for $182 million. Levey stated the Diem Association had ended due to a lack of US support, and that "despite giving us positive substantive feedback on the design of the network, it nevertheless became clear from our dialogue with federal regulators that the project could not move ahead."

=== Chief Legal Officer, Oracle ===
After leaving Diem, he was a principal at WestExec Advisors. Levey then joined Oracle Corporation as executive vice president and chief legal officer in November 2022, working under Safra Catz, Oracle's CEO at the time.

Political offices
New office	Under Secretary of the Treasury for Terrorism and Financial Intelligence; 2004-2011	Succeeded by David S. Cohen
Preceded by Henry Paulson	United States Secretary of the Treasury; Acting; 2009	Succeeded by Timothy Geithner
