= Stephen Kappes =

Deputy Director of the CIA (born 1951)

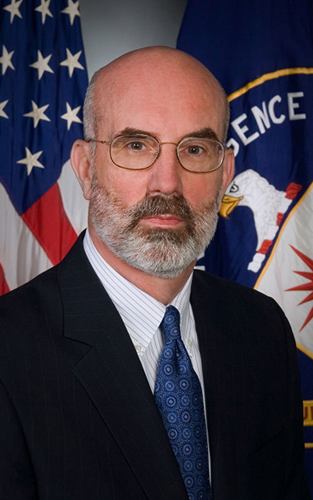
- Official portrait, 2010

2nd Deputy Director of the Central Intelligence Agency
- In office January 29, 2006 – May 5, 2010
- President: George W. Bush; Barack Obama
- Preceded by: Albert Calland
- Succeeded by: Michael Morell

Personal details
- Born: August 22, 1951 (age 75) Cincinnati, Ohio, U.S.
- Education: Ohio University; Ohio State University
- Profession: Intelligence officer

Stephen R. Kappes (born August 22, 1951) was the Deputy Director of the Central Intelligence Agency (DDCIA), until his resignation on April 14, 2010. He had served in the CIA since 1981, with a two-year hiatus. A career clandestine operations professional, Kappes supervised the extraordinary rendition program, a non-judicial system of rendering persons suspected of terrorism to secret locations where most of them were interrogated. Kappes also helped persuade Libyan leader Muammar al-Gaddafi to abandon his nuclear weapons program in 2003. In 2009, Kappes was convicted in absentia by an Italian court for his headquarters-based role in the rendition and torture of an Egyptian citizen who was kidnapped from Italian soil by the CIA.

== Education and military service ==
Kappes earned a Bachelor of Science degree in pre-medicine from Ohio University and a Master of Science degree in pathology from Ohio State University. He served as an officer in the U.S. Marine Corps from 1976 to 1981.

== CIA career (1981–2004) ==
Kappes joined the Central Intelligence Agency in 1981 and held a variety of operational assignments in Europe and the Middle East and managerial positions at CIA Headquarters. Kappes has been station chief in New Delhi, Frankfurt, Kuwait City and Moscow from 1996 to 1999. He also served in Pakistan. Kappes served as Chief of the Near East and South Asia Division from 1999 to 2000. Kappes served as Associate Deputy Director of Operations for Counterintelligence from 2000 to 2002, then as associate deputy director (ADDO) under Deputy Director for Operations (DDO) James Pavitt till 2004.

=== Libya negotiations ===
Towards the end of his tenure with the CIA, he worked with President George W. Bush in negotiations with Libya that ended that country's weapons-of-mass-destruction (WMD) programs. In a joint diplomatic mission with the United Kingdom's MI6 head of counter terrorism Sir Mark Allen, the pair engaged with Libya's secret service head (Moussa Koussa, who later defected to the UK), which resulted in an end of support for terrorist activity by Colonel Muammar al-Gaddafi’s Libya, and a resultant end of international sanctions against Libya.

=== Deputy Director of Operations ===
Kappes was named Deputy Director for Operations (DDO) for the CIA in June 2004 and took office in August 2004 while the appointment of Porter Goss as the next Director of Central Intelligence was still pending in the Senate. Kappes succeeded James Pavitt, who resigned in June 2004. Both Kappes and Pavitt (and others) oversaw the CIA's Directorate for Operations during the controversial Iraq WMD reporting. He served in that position until he resigned in November 2004. John E. McLaughlin, the then-Deputy Director of Central Intelligence, announced his departure the same week Kappes quit, thus exacerbating the rumored management problems for Goss.

=== Dramatic departure in 2004 ===
It had been widely reported in the press that Kappes quit rather than carry out a request by Goss to reassign Michael Sulick, his then deputy. It is also reported that this incident occurred because Goss's chief of staff admonished the then assistant Deputy Director for Counterintelligence, Mary Margaret Graham – who later worked for the Director of National Intelligence (DNI) John Negroponte – about leaking personnel information. According to some news reports, Sulick had engaged in a shouting match with Goss's chief of staff.

For a brief period in between his appointments at the CIA, Kappes worked in the private security industry. In April 2005, ArmorGroup, a British security firm, named him vice president in charge of global strategy and named him Chief Operating Officer (COO) in November 2005.

== Second CIA tour (2006–2010) ==
Kappes was named as the next DDCIA by Negroponte in May 2006. Kappes was believed to be the preferred choice for Director of the CIA in the incoming Obama administration by Senators Jay Rockefeller, the outgoing chairman, and Dianne Feinstein, the incoming chairwoman of the Senate Intelligence Committee. Instead, Leon Panetta was appointed to the position in February 2009, and Kappes was retained as DDCIA, the latter a condition set by Feinstein in exchange for her support for the former.

=== Convicted of kidnapping, extraordinary rendition and torture ===
On November 4, 2009, in a landmark ruling, Italian judge Oscar Magi convicted 22 American CIA operatives of kidnapping Muslim cleric Osama Moustafa Hassan Nasr, known as Abu Omar, from the streets of Milan in 2003. Most of the top CIA officers had left the agency, with the exception of Kappes, who at the time was the assistant director of the CIA's clandestine branch.

=== Role in hiding detainee death ===
Per official reports, Kappes was responsible for the alteration of records regarding the death of a detainee at the 'Salt Pit', a secret CIA interrogation operation in Afghanistan. A detainee froze to death, after having been showered with water and left outside overnight. Kappes made certain that the death was retained 'off the books'. According to two former officials who read a CIA inspector general's report on the incident, Kappes coached the base chief—whose identity was withheld at the request of the CIA—on how to respond to the agency's investigators. They would report it as an accident.

=== Sudden retirement, no explanation ===
On April 14, 2010, CIA director Leon Panetta reported that Kappes would be retiring in May. The odd timing of the retirement, and lack of Presidential thanks for his years of service, led some to comment that this was a departure in disgrace.

Government offices
Preceded by James Pavitt	CIA Deputy Director for Operations; August 2004 – November 2004	Succeeded by Jose A. Rodriguez Jr.
Preceded by Albert Calland	Deputy Director of the Central Intelligence Agency; July 2006 – April 2010	Succeeded by Michael Morell
