= Michael Morell =

Deputy Director of the CIA (born 1958)

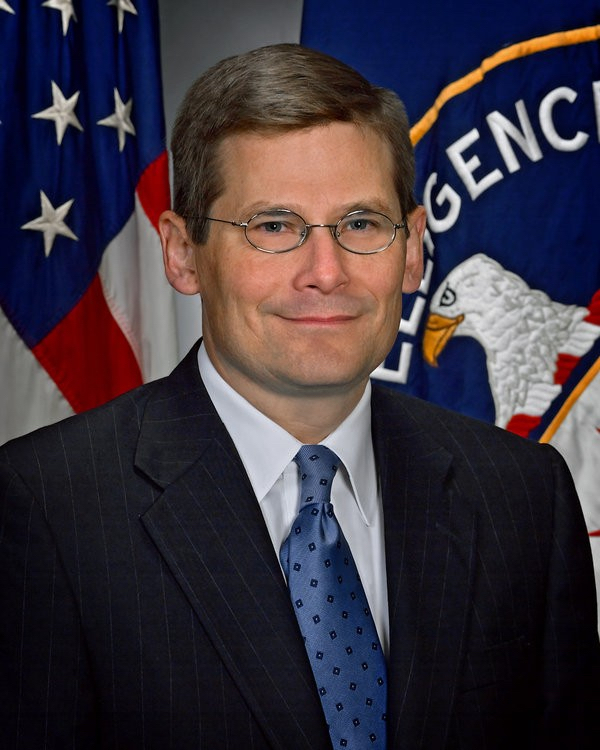

Director of the Central Intelligence Agency
- Acting
- In office November 9, 2012 – March 8, 2013
- President: Barack Obama
- Preceded by: David Petraeus
- Succeeded by: John O. Brennan
- In office July 1, 2011 – September 6, 2011
- President: Barack Obama
- Preceded by: Leon Panetta
- Succeeded by: David Petraeus

3rd Deputy Director of the Central Intelligence Agency
- In office May 6, 2010 – August 9, 2013
- President: Barack Obama
- Preceded by: Stephen Kappes
- Succeeded by: Avril Haines

Personal details
- Born: Michael Joseph Morell; September 4, 1958 (age 68) Cuyahoga Falls, Ohio, U.S.
- Party: Independent
- Spouse: Mary Beth Manion
- Children: 3
- Education: University of Akron (BA); Georgetown University (MA)

Michael Joseph Morell (/məˈrɛl/; born September 4, 1958) is an American former career intelligence analyst. He was the deputy director of the Central Intelligence Agency from 2010 to 2013 and twice as its acting director, first in 2011 and then from 2012 to 2013. He is also a professor at the George Mason University - Schar School of Policy and Government.

As a CIA analyst he was presidential daily briefer to George W. Bush, including both "Bin Ladin Determined To Strike in US" for the President Only, August 6, 2001, President's Daily Brief and on the morning of September 11, 2001. In his book, The Great War of Our Time, Morell defends the use of drones by both the Bush and Obama administrations against suspected terrorists and he explains the CIA's use of enhanced interrogation techniques (what many call torture) by the Bush administration. He is now senior counselor and the global chairman of the Geo-Political Risk Practice at Beacon Global Strategies LLC, a consulting firm in Washington, D.C.

== Early life and education ==
The son of an autoworker and homemaker, Morell is a native of Cuyahoga Falls, Ohio. He went to Saint Joseph's School and Cuyahoga Falls High School there. He is a first generation college student. He has a bachelor of arts from the University of Akron and a master of arts from Georgetown University, both in economics. He joined the CIA in 1980 and worked there for 33 years.

== Career ==
Most of Morell's early work in the agency was devoted to energy and to East Asian projects. During his mid-career, Morell managed the staff that produced the president's daily brief, and was the executive assistant to DCI George Tenet. Morell was President George W. Bush's daily intelligence briefer during 2001, including on September 11. Morell spent the entire day with the president. When asked by Bush who was responsible for the attacks that day, Morell said, "I have no doubt that the trail will lead to the doorstep of Bin Laden and al-Qa’ida."

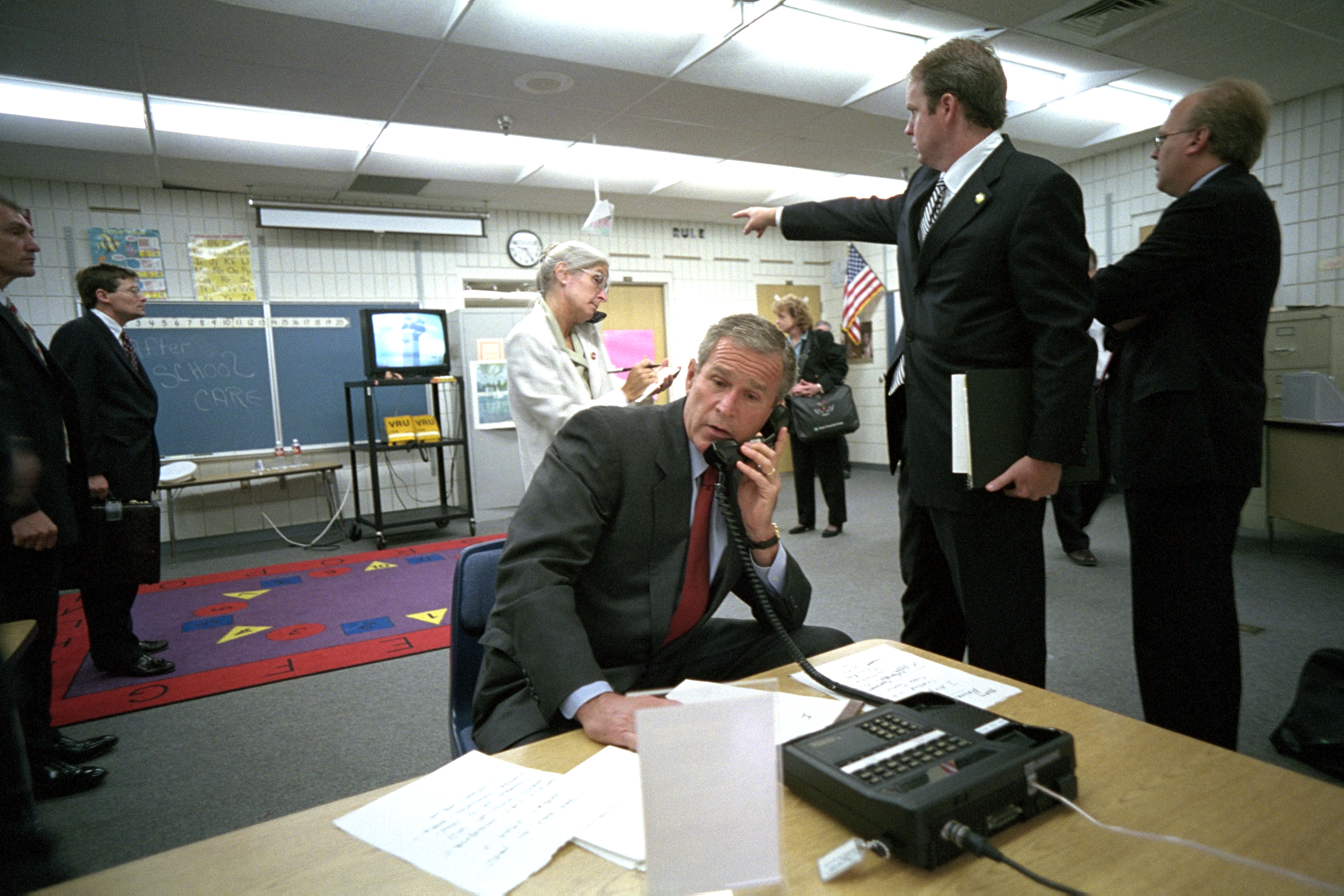
Morell (far left) watching 9/11 unfold from the Emma Booker Elementary School with President Bush

Morell also was director for intelligence, the agency's top analyst, from 2008 to 2010. He was the CIA's associate deputy director, the agency's top administrator, from 2006 to 2008.

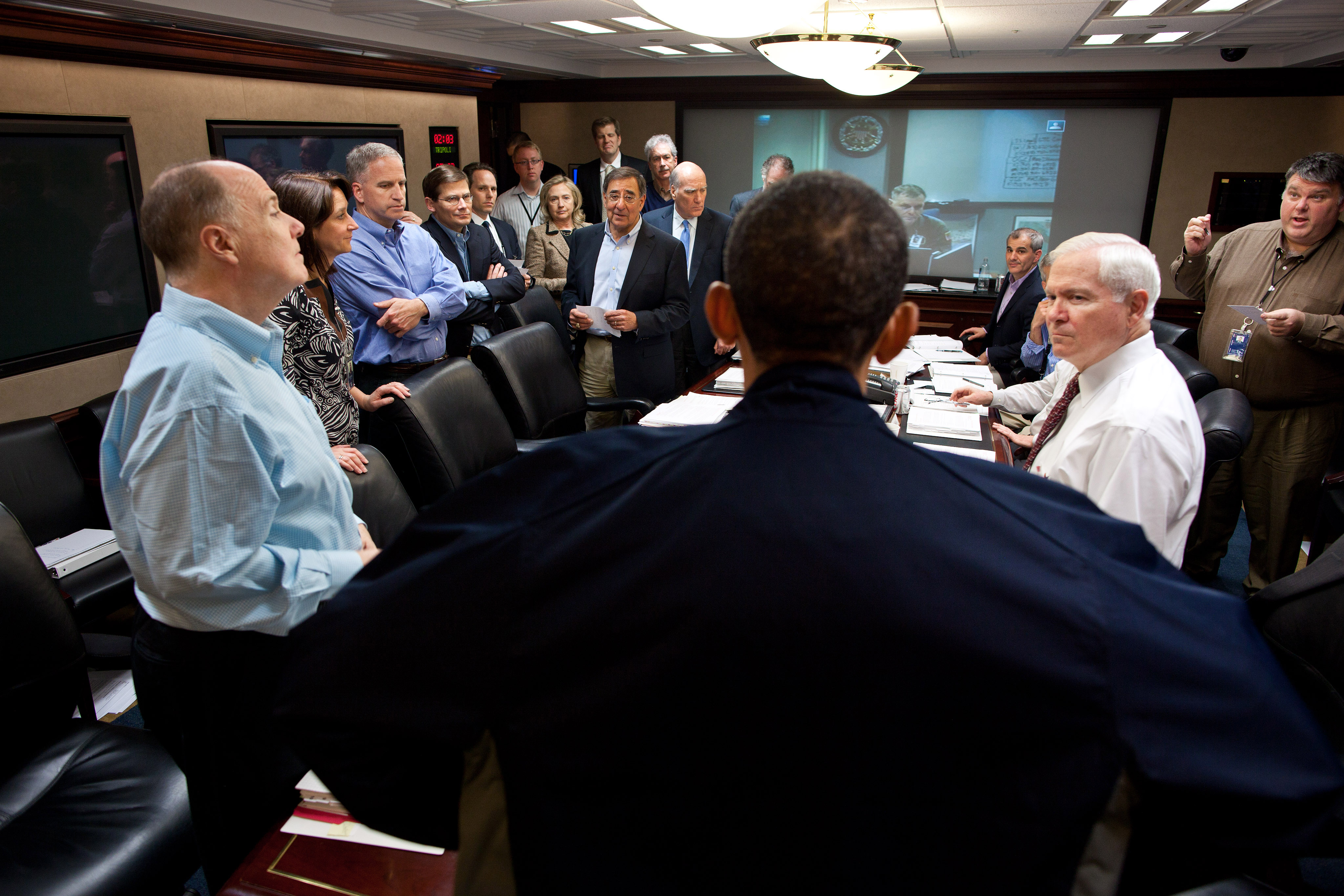
Morell, Leon Panetta, Hillary Clinton and other members of President Obama's national security team in May 2011

In May 2010, Morell was sworn in as the deputy director of the CIA, succeeding Stephen Kappes. Morell was awarded the Distinguished Intelligence Medal, the agency's second highest honor, for his role in the bin Laden operation. President Obama, knowing that Morell was with President Bush on 9/11, sent Morell to Dallas to brief him on the raid two weeks after bin Laden was killed.

From July 1, 2011, to September 6, 2011, Morell did his first stint as acting director of the CIA, replacing Leon Panetta after he was confirmed as secretary of defense. On November 9, 2012, Morell once again became acting director after the resignation of David Petraeus, following a sex scandal. President Obama considered naming Morell as Petraeus's permanent replacement but chose John Brennan instead; Brennan was confirmed by the U.S. Senate by a 63 to 34 vote on March 5, 2013. Morell announced his retirement from the CIA on June 12, 2013, and left the agency in early September 2013.

== After retiring from government ==
In November 2013, Morell joined Beacon Global Strategies as a senior counselor. In 2018, Beacon named Morell as the head of its geo-political risk practice. In this role, Morell advises firms on global developments and what they mean for the companies.

In January 2014, Morell joined CBS News as an on-air contributor on intelligence and national security. In 2018, CBS began producing Morell's weekly podcast on national security, titled Intelligence Matters. In each episode, Morell speaks with current and former members of the intelligence community as well as policymakers about their careers and about national security issues. Each episode is distributed as a podcast and an hour-long program on CBS News Radio. Morell also contributes to the media in other ways, as a contributing columnist to The Washington Post and as an expert voice on Axios.

=== Edward Snowden ===
Morell has criticised whistleblower Edward Snowden for exposing NSA's global surveillance programs, claiming Snowden's exposé of the said programs led to profound damage. Morell said that a U.S. jury should decide whether Snowden was a patriot or a traitor.

=== Memoir ===
In May 2015, Morell's book entitled The Great War of Our Time: The CIA's Fight Against Terrorism—From al Qa'ida to ISIS was released. A New York Times bestseller, the book traces his three-decade-long career at the CIA, with a focus on the agency's counterterrorism missions both before and after the September 11 attacks. The book deals with the public controversies related to the country's post-9/11 counterterrorism activities. In the book, Morell defends targeted killings by drones, calling drone warfare the "single most effective [counterterrorism] tool in the last five years" and calling concerns over civilian deaths "highly exaggerated." In response to claims from Morell and others in the Obama administration about limited civilian casualties, drone strike survivors in Pakistan and Yemen in 2016 recounted how the bombings killed and maimed their friends and family members.

In the book, Morrell also criticized the Senate Intelligence Committee's report on CIA torture, challenging the veracity of the report and objecting to the use of the word "torture," noting that the Department of Justice at the time said that the harsh techniques—which included mock drownings, sleep deprivation, and painful bodily contortions—were not torture, and were not in conflict with US domestic torture statutes and US treaty obligations on torture." "I don't like calling it torture for one simple reason: to call it torture says my guys were torturers," Morell told Vice in 2015. "I'm gonna defend my guys till my last breath," again noting that the Bush administration's Justice Department said it was not torture.

In response to his 2015 memoir, Senate Intelligence Committee staffers were so troubled by Morell's attacks on the committee's report that they issued a lengthy rebuttal. Referencing the CIA's own documents, the report said Morell's accounts of the CIA "enhanced interrogation" program contained numerous errors and misrepresentation of established facts. In talking about the staffers' rebuttal on The Charlie Rose Show, Morell said that, while his critique was sharper, it was consistent with the CIA's official comments on the committee's report and with the dissent published by a number of Republicans on the committee.

In a separate book written by a group of former CIA senior officials, Morell critiqued the media's coverage of the Senate report.

=== Apology to Colin Powell ===
Also in his book, Morell apologized to former Secretary of State Colin Powell for the CIA's erroneous assessments of Iraq's weapons of mass destruction programs.

=== Endorsement of Hillary Clinton for president ===
In an August 2016 op-ed for The New York Times, Morell endorsed Hillary Clinton for president. Stating that he was registered with neither the Democratic nor Republican parties and that he had always been silent about his political preferences, Morell stated that Donald Trump was "not only unqualified for the job, but he may well pose a threat to our national security." Morell left his job as a CBS News analyst before making the endorsement, but rejoined CBS News after the election. In a subsequent Q&A article with The New York Times, Morell responded to allegations that his current employer, Beacon Global Strategies, was co-founded by "former associates" of Hillary Clinton, by saying it was a non-partisan firm and that he had spoken out "entirely on [my] own, with no other consideration given any thought."

=== Chelsea Manning ===
In September 2017, Morell resigned from his senior fellowship at the Belfer Center for Science and International Affairs of Harvard University's John F. Kennedy School of Government as a result of Chelsea Manning's appointment as a senior fellow there.

=== China ===
In 2017, Morell was appointed to serve on the National Defense Strategy Commission, a congressionally created body designed to give Congress an independent view of America's defense needs. The group's final report concluded that US defense capabilities were eroding relative to those of China and Russia.

=== Briefing book ===
In early 2019, Morell, along with fellow former acting and deputy director of the CIA John E. McLaughlin, brought together a group of former CIA, NSA, and FBI officers to produce a briefing book on a dozen or so key national security issues facing the nation. Morell and McLaughlin provided the book to all candidates running for president, whether Democrat, Republican, or independent, and included President Trump's reelection campaign. The two told the press that the aim of the book was to provide a basis of fact and analysis as campaigns developed their foreign policy positions and as they debated the issues. The book did not advocate particular policies.

=== Khashoggi ===
In April 2019, Washington Post columnist David Ignatius reported that Morell, who had been consulting for a US firm that did work with Saudi Arabia, stepped down from that role following the killing of Saudi national, US resident, and Washington Post columnist Jamal Khashoggi. Ignatius wrote that Morell withdrew "over concern about the direction that Saudi Arabia was heading."

=== Spy Museum ===
In 2019, the International Spy Museum unveiled a new interactive exhibit hosted by Morell. In the exhibit, Morell leads participants through a red-teaming exercise of the intelligence that pointed to Osama bin Laden hiding at a compound in Abbottabad, Pakistan. The exhibit is one of the museum's most popular.

=== Hunter Biden laptop ===
In October 2020, Morell signed an open letter stating that the Biden laptop story “has the classic earmarks of a Russian information operation." Joe Biden cited the letter Morell had signed, during a presidential debate in 2020 to deflect criticism by Donald Trump. As of three years later, no evidence has emerged to support Morell's statement that the laptop appeared to be Russian disinformation.

In November 2022 CBS News published statements from the chief technology officer of Computer Forensics Services (from whom CBS commissioned analysis and investigation) declaring: "I have no doubt in my mind that this data was created by Hunter Biden, and that it came from a computer under Mr. Biden's control”. Morell has said that part of his motivation for signing the open letter, and requesting others to sign it, was to alert the American people of his concerns, and "to help vice president Biden….Because I wanted him to win the election". He said that contact from Biden's campaign adviser Antony Blinken triggered the letter he signed.

=== Criticism of Morell as a Biden cabinet pick ===
In late 2020, Morell was mentioned as a possible candidate for director of the Central Intelligence Agency in the Biden administration. Ultimately, the post went to former United States deputy secretary of state and career diplomat Williams J. Burns.

When President-elect Biden was reportedly considering Morell for CIA director, Senate Intelligence Committee member Ron Wyden (D-Oregon) publicly charged Morell with being a "torture apologist" and said nomination for a cabinet post would be a "nonstarter." Daniel Jones, the lead investigator for the Senate Intelligence Committee's torture report, was also critical of Morell. Jones urged President-elect Biden not to nominate Morell, who was acting CIA Director during a portion of the Senate investigation. Jones said Morell had also failed to sufficiently discipline two CIA officials who destroyed videotapes of CIA torture incidents.

In a February interview at the Michael Hayden Center at George Mason University, Morell said he was never formally considered for the post of CIA director.

=== Writings and interviews ===
Morell has written dozens of op-eds and given hundreds of media interviews since leaving government. His writings and interviews suggest the world is a dangerous place and that to keep the country safe, the United States must take a leadership role in the world, it must have strong allies with whom it works together on tough issues, and it must have a strong military, intelligence service, and diplomatic service in order to deter adversaries. Second, for the United States to be strong abroad, it must be strong at home. Morell says that "the most important determinant of a country's national security is the health of its economy and society" and that the thing that most keeps him up at night is the failure of our politicians to come together, to compromise, and to make decisions that move our economy and our society forward.

On May 19, 2015, during his book tour, Morell stated on MSNBC that what Vice President Dick Cheney said publicly about Iraq's nuclear weapons program before the war in 2003 was inconsistent with the views of the intelligence community. MSNBC host Chris Matthews said, "Here on Hardball last night, the top CIA official, the man who briefed President Bush on a daily basis, said that what Cheney said was not true. I've been doing this business for a long time, rarely do you get that Perry Mason moment. When the guy comes and just says, You know what? I'm the top briefer from the CIA for the president. I'm deputy DCI. I'm right there telling them all we knew, and we never knew and never said he had a nuclear weapon. And yet we went into war with that argument."

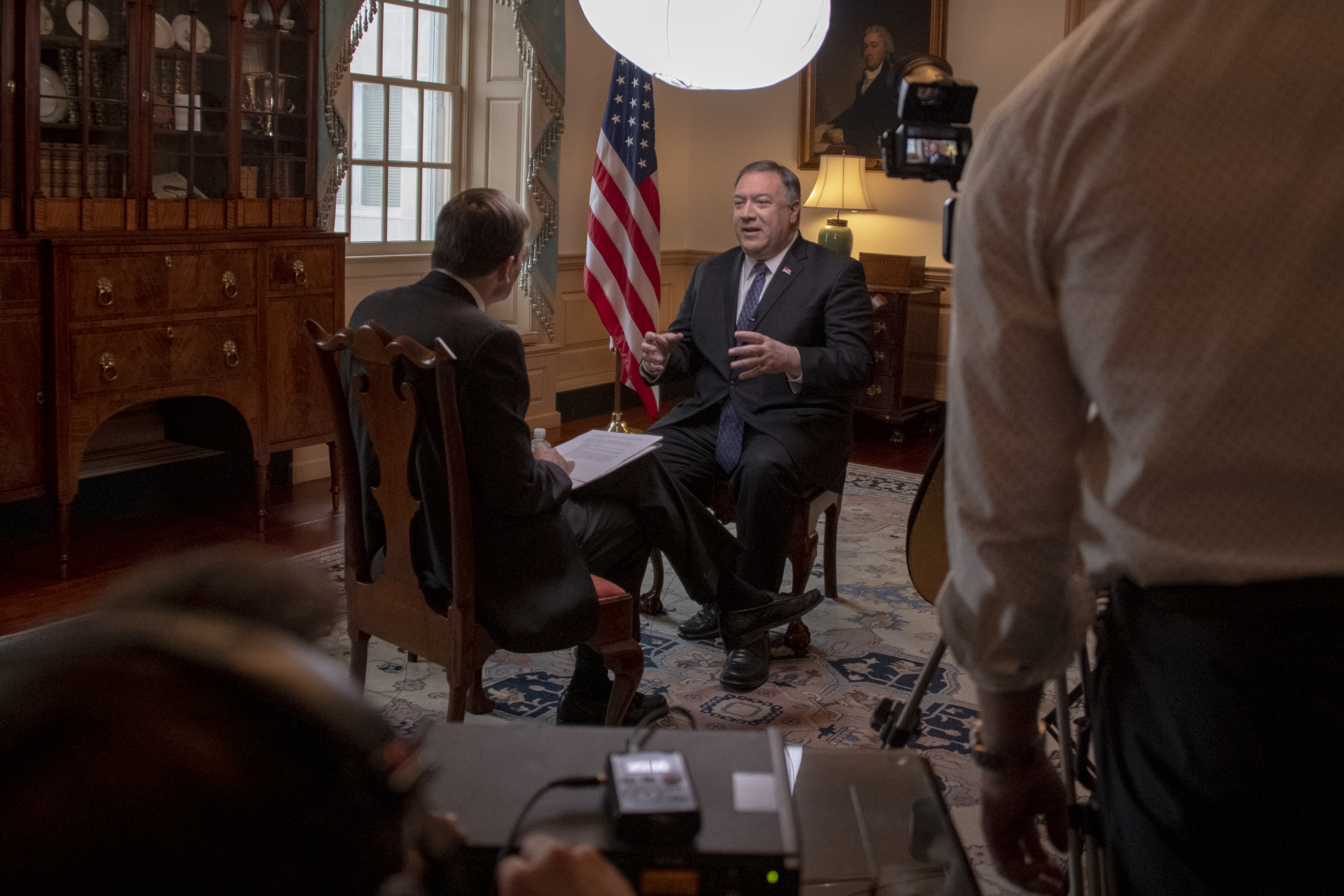
Morell interviewing Secretary of State Mike Pompeo for CBS News' Intelligence Matters Podcast

In an interview with Charlie Rose in August 2016, Morell blamed Syrian President Bashar al-Assad, Russia, and Iran for the extremely high civilian death toll in Syria. He called on the opposition in Syria to deter Russia and Iran by making them "pay a price" for their involvement in Syria, in part by targeting their military personnel in the country. He also called on the United States to conduct limited, precision bombings of Syrian government targets in order to bring Assad to the negotiating table. Regarding President Assad, Morell argued "I want to go after those things, such as his personal helicopter and aircraft, that Assad sees as his personal power base. I want to scare Assad."

In October 2016, Morell told Rose that the United States should confront Iran's behavior in the Middle East, and he voiced support for the Saudi Arabian-led intervention in Yemen against Yemen's Houthis, pointing out that the Iranians were supporting the Houthis as a proxy force against the Saudis. Morell said "Ships leave Iran on a regular basis carrying arms to the Houthis in Yemen." Morell also said that Iran wants "to be the hegemonic power in the region" and Arab states of the Persian Gulf are "pushing back against that".

In December 2016, Morell suggested that the interference of Russia in the 2016 United States presidential election was "the political equivalent of 9/11". He added that President Obama should retaliate imminently with harsh sanctions, in spite of president-elect Donald Trump's doubts about the allegations of Russian influence. In March 2017, Morell said: "On the question of the Trump campaign conspiring with the Russians here, there is smoke, but there is no fire at all. There's no little campfire, there's no little candle, there's no spark. And there's a lot of people looking for it."

In April 2019, Morell, along with Stanford professor Amy Zegart, wrote a piece in Foreign Affairs titled "Spies, Lies, and Algorithms: Why the Intelligence Community Must Adapt or Fail". In the article, Morell and Zegart argue that the intelligence community is falling further behind in the technology race, a development that poses a significant risk to the country. The authors say that this lag has already caused a significant intelligence breakdown, the failure of the community to see in a timely manner Russia's weaponization of social media during the 2016 presidential election.

=== Advisory groups ===
Since retiring from CIA in 2013, Morell has served on a number of boards or advisory groups related to national security. He currently serves on the board of the Atlantic Council, a Washington, D.C. think tank on international affairs. He serves on the advisory boards of the Alliance for Securing Democracy at the German Marshall Fund, the American Media Abroad group, and the University of Chicago's Institute of Politics. Morell also serves on the board of CyberDome. He served on the advisory board of the Committee to Investigate Russia, a group organized by Hollywood director Rob Reiner and The Atlantic senior editor David Frum.

=== Teaching ===
Since retiring from the CIA, Morell has also spent time teaching and mentoring at a variety of colleges and universities. He is currently a distinguished visiting professor at the Michael V. Hayden Center at the Schar School of Policy and Government at George Mason University, where he teaches classes on intelligence and moderates on-the-record conversations on intelligence, including a March 2019 event on Congress and the Intelligence Community, titled The Hill Has Eyes: Congressional Oversight of Intelligence. He was later named Distinguished Senior Fellow of the center during founder Michael Hayden's medical leave. Morell spent the fall quarter of 2016 teaching a seminar as a resident fellow at the Institute of Politics at the University of Chicago. Morell has also spent time at Stanford, Dartmouth, Harvard, West Point, and his alma mater, the University of Akron.

== Personal life ==
Morell is married to Mary Beth Morell (née Manion), and they have three children.

In January 2025, President Donald Trump revoked Morell's security clearance.

Government offices
Preceded by Stephen Kappes	Deputy Director of the Central Intelligence Agency; 2010–2013	Succeeded by Avril Haines
Preceded by Leon Panetta	Director of the Central Intelligence Agency; Acting; 2011	Succeeded by David Petraeus
Preceded by David Petraeus	Director of the Central Intelligence Agency; Acting; 2012–2013	Succeeded by John Brennan
