= Jack G. Downing =

CIA deputy director (1940–2021)

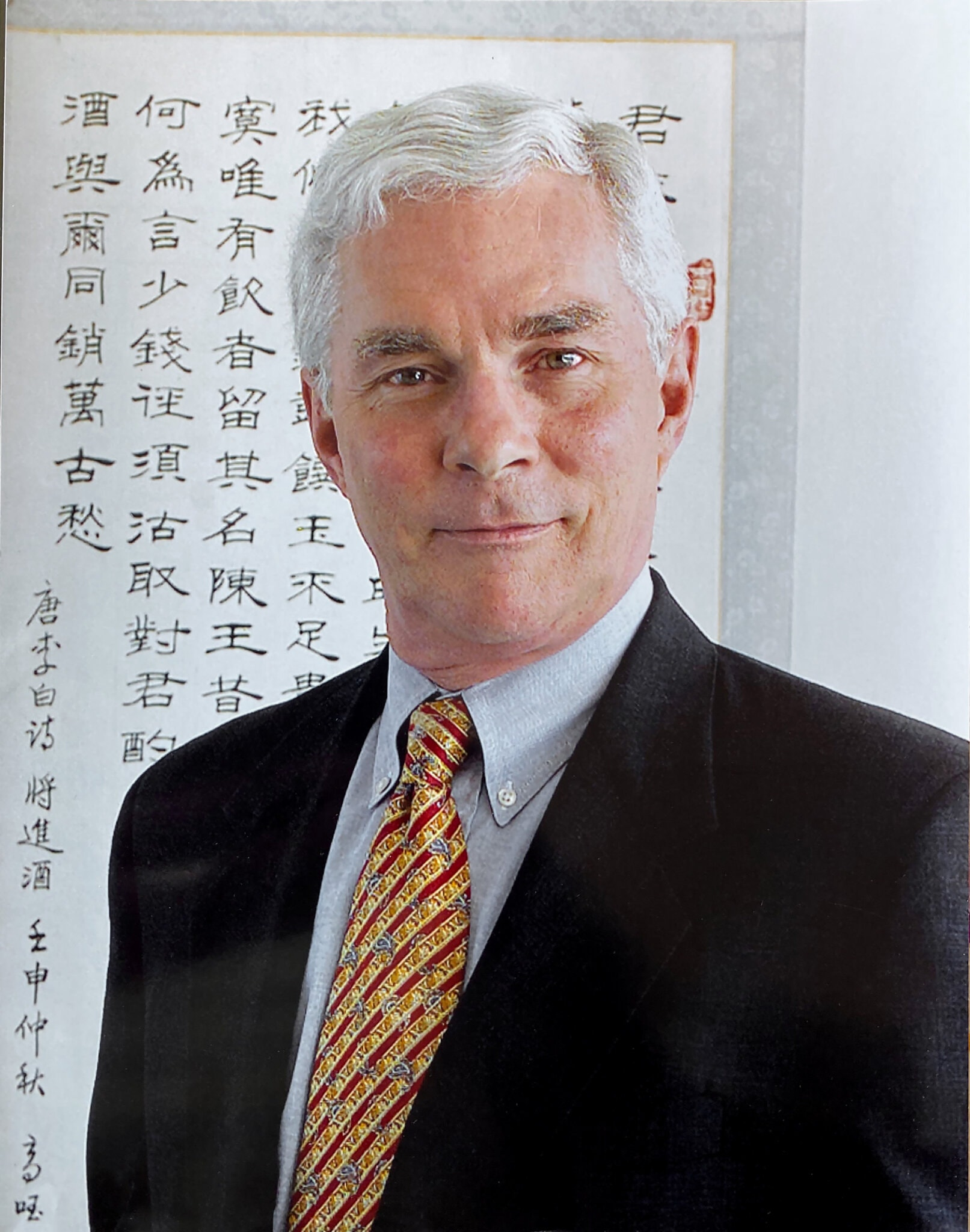
- Downing in 1999, CIA photograph
- Born: Jack Gregory Downing; October 21, 1940; Honolulu, Territory of Hawaii, U.S.
- Died: June 27, 2021 (aged 80); Portland, Oregon, U.S.
- Education: Harvard University
- Occupation: Deputy Director of CIA for Operations
- Spouse: Suzanne Leisenring
- Children: 2

Jack Gregory Downing (October 21, 1940 – June 27, 2021) was an American field officer for the Central Intelligence Agency (CIA). He served as its Deputy Director for Operations (DDO) from 1997 until July 1999. He was the only person to act as the agency's chief of station in both Moscow and Beijing.

== Early life ==
Downing was born in Honolulu on October 21, 1940. His father, John, served as an officer in the United States Navy and was killed in the Pacific Theater at the start of World War II, when Downing was only a year old. His mother, Benita (Harding), consequently relocated to her parents' home in Texas, together with Downing and his sister. He attended The Hill School in Pottstown, Pennsylvania, before studying Chinese and history, and Asian studies at Harvard University. After graduating in 1962, he joined the U.S. Marine Corps, completing Officer Candidate School and subsequently serving two combat tours in Vietnam as an infantry officer. He was discharged in 1967 and was sworn in as an officer for the CIA three days later.

== Career ==
Downing served as station chief in Kuala Lumpur. He was also special assistant to Stansfield Turner during the latter's tenure as Director of Central Intelligence under the Carter administration. During the early 1980s, he worked with Tony Mendez to develop a graduate course for spies, training them to work clandestinely in capital cities abroad. Downing went on to learn Russian and was chief of station in Moscow from 1986 to 1989. There, he stymied efforts by the KGB to place Russian double agents. He then served as station chief in Beijing and eventually became chief of the CIA's East Asia Division. As of 2021, he was the only person to have served as the agency's station head in both Moscow and Beijing. He retired from his post in 1995, and became vice president of an information systems and consulting firm.

Downing left retirement two years later when he was asked by George Tenet, the director of Central Intelligence at the time, to head the Directorate of Operations in 1997. When he took over the post, the agency was plagued by management turmoil and budget cuts, which led to a reduction in the number of case officers and poor morale overall. Under Downing's leadership, resignations by DO case officers markedly declined "by one-half to two-thirds". He worked with Porter Goss to increase funding for foreign espionage operations, warning field officers in his first address to them after taking the reins that "trying to do more with less only means we will do nothing". Downing was also responsible for speeding up recruitment, enhancing training for spycraft and foreign languages, and resuming operations of stations in Africa. He brought back parachute training for operations officers, reasoning that "ordinary people are not inclined to jump out of an airplane, and we are not looking for ordinary people". Downing retired for the second and final time in 1999. Goss credited him with placing the DO "in a position to collect intelligence on whatever threats and challenges come our way in the next century". He was succeeded by James Pavitt, who was his deputy.

Together with former director Richard Helms, Downing played a key role in establishing the CIA Officers Memorial Foundation. The charity assists in funding the education of children of agents killed in the line of duty. He was awarded the Distinguished Intelligence Medal.

== Personal life ==
Downing was married to Suzanne (née Leisenring) until his death. Together, they had two children: John and Wendy. Tenet described Downing as "a Renaissance man [who] reads Chinese poetry for kicks".

Downing died on June 27, 2021, in Portland, Oregon. He was 80, and suffered from colon cancer prior to his death.

== Bibliography ==
- CIA press release announcing Downing's resignation
- Association of Former Intelligence Officers newsletter, May 1999

Government offices
Preceded by David Cohen	CIA Deputy Director for Operations; 1997 – July 1999	Succeeded by James Pavitt
