= Vaughn Bishop =

American intelligence officer (1946–2023)

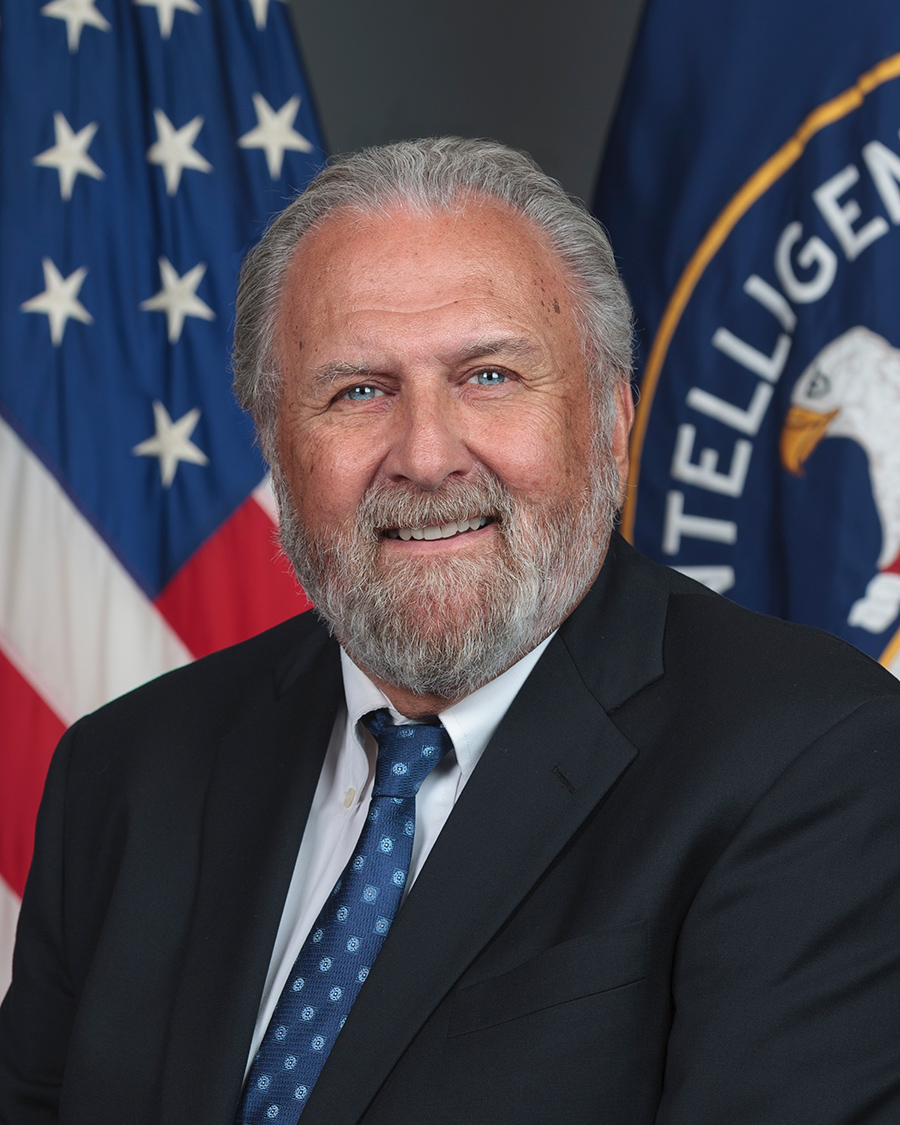
- Official portrait, 2018

7th Deputy Director of the Central Intelligence Agency
- In office August 1, 2018 – January 20, 2021
- President: Donald Trump
- Preceded by: Gina Haspel
- Succeeded by: David Cohen

Personal details
- Born: Vaughn Frederick Bishop; 1946
- Died: March 2023 (aged 76–77)
- Children: 2
- Education: Northwestern University (BA, MA, PhD)

Vaughn Frederick Bishop (1946 – March 2023) was an American intelligence officer and former Deputy Director of the Central Intelligence Agency (CIA) who served from August 1, 2018, to January 20, 2021, and was appointed by President Donald Trump. Bishop first joined the CIA in 1981, and retired in 2011. He returned to the CIA four years later to serve as CIA Ombudsman for Analytic Objectivity during the Agency's modernization effort.

== Education ==
Bishop earned a bachelor's degree in political science from Northwestern University in 1968, a master's degree in 1970, and a doctorate in Political Science and African Studies in 1974. Before he joined the CIA, Bishop served as an Assistant Professor of Political Science at Emory University in Atlanta, Georgia.

== CIA career ==
Bishop joined the CIA in 1981. In the early 1990s, he led the CIA's Somalia Task Force. From 1996 to 1999 he served as Chief of Station, where he focused on building key partnerships to counter terrorism. From 1999 to 2001 he was the CIA's representative to PACOM. He also led the CIA's analytic efforts in Asia, Latin America, and Africa. From 2006 to 2009 he was responsible for forming a critical analytics partnership with a major ally. Bishop was then asked to serve as National Intelligence Officer for Africa. He rose to become the Vice Chairman of the National Intelligence Council in 2010. He retired from the CIA in 2011.

== Personal life ==
Bishop was married and had two children. He was also a grandfather. In March 2023, his death was announced by William J. Burns, Director of the Central Intelligence Agency.
