= James Pavitt =

American army officer (born 1946)

James L. Pavitt (born February 19, 1946) was deputy director for operations (DDO) for the CIA from June 23, 1999, until July 12, 2004, when he resigned a day after George Tenet. The CIA said the resignations were for personal reasons.

== Background ==
Pavitt was born in St. Louis, Missouri, and graduated from the University of Missouri (B.A., 1968) in Columbia, Missouri as a member of Phi Beta Kappa. After graduation, he was a National Defense Education Act fellow at Clark University (1969). He was a principal of The Scowcroft Group, an international business advisory firm, and was formerly on the board of the Association of Former Intelligence Officers (AFIO).

He was married with two children (from a previous marriage) and resided in McLean, Virginia.

His hobbies included collecting art, especially primitive American art.

== Intelligence career ==
Pavitt served in the United States Army from 1969 to 1971 as an intelligence officer and was a legislative assistant with the House of Representatives from 1971 until 1973.

After joining the CIA, Pavitt was posted to Austria, Germany, Malaysia, and Luxembourg between 1976 and 1983. He was expelled (PNG'd) from East Germany. He was chief of station in Luxembourg (1983–1986). He served as a branch chief in the Africa Division. From 1990 to 1993, he served on the National Security Council team under Brent Scowcroft as senior intelligence advisor to President George H. W. Bush. After being assigned to work across the agency operational/analytical divide in the Directorate of Intelligence, he became the founder and first chief of the Directorate of Operation's Counterproliferation Division (CPD). Gordon Oehler, then chief of the Directorate of Intelligence's Non-Proliferation Center, criticized this as being redundant and stepping on his turf. This was considered a specious critique by veteran Agency HUMINT operations officers, however, especially those who had been assigned under Oehler previously and realized that Oehler held HUMINT counterproliferation operations—indeed, covert operations in general—in considerable disdain. Pavitt hand picked operations officers, some of which were Nonofficial Cover Officers (NOCs) including Valerie Plame, to staff the CPD. In 1997 he was appointed associate deputy director of operations. He was deputy director of operations from 1999 until his resignation in 2004. In 2003, the CPD took down the nuclear black market being operated by Abdul Qadeer Khan.

After September 11, 2001, Pavitt was responsible for sending Special Activities Division teams to Afghanistan, Pakistan, Indonesia, Thailand, and Somalia to capture Al Qaeda members. The first Hellfire missiles fired from drones were under his command. They were aimed at an Al Qaeda convoy in Sudan in which all occupants, including an American citizen, were killed. The administration came under fire for having acted on faulty intelligence, particularly that which was single-sourced to the informant known as Curveball.

In April 2004 he appeared before the 9/11 Commission. The BBC called his 9/11 commission appearance 'unprecedented'. The commission's report said that shortly after Bush's election, Pavitt told the president-elect that Osama bin Laden was one of the gravest threats to the country. He also added that killing the Al Qaeda leader would have an effect but not stop the threat posed by the terrorist organization.

When Bush put Porter Goss in charge of the agency, Pavitt reportedly opposed the internal reorganizations announced by Goss, on the ground that they might "do damage to a strategic effort that has produced excellent work on terrorism and a variety of other important issues." On June 4, 2004, he unexpectedly announced his retirement one day after George Tenet. The CIA said Pavitt's decision was unconnected with Tenet's departure. Pavitt was succeeded by his deputy, Stephen Kappes. On June 21, 2004, Pavitt delivered one of his last speeches as DDO to the Foreign Policy Association. He resigned in July 12, 2004, one day after of Tenet's resignation.

Pavitt is a recipient of the CIA's Distinguished Intelligence Medal. He is also a recipient of the CIA Distinguished Career Intelligence Medal, the CIA Director’s Medal and the Donovan Award.

=== Post-CIA work ===
He is an advisor to the Patriot Defense Group, LLC, to Olton Solutions Ltd. in the United Kingdom, and to The Scowcroft Group. He is a director of CACI International, Inc.

=== Criticism and controversy ===
Some former operations officers are critical of Pavitt, citing his four international postings over ten years in a 30-year career as insufficient experience for a Deputy Director of Operations. The Senate Intelligence Committee report on CIA torture found that Pavitt was told that rectal exams of at least two CIA prisoners had been conducted with "excessive force" but he took action to stop this behavior.

Government offices
Preceded by Jack G. Downing	CIA Deputy Director for Operations; August 1999 – June 4, 2004	Succeeded by Stephen Kappes
