= Deputy Director of the Central Intelligence Agency =

Position at the Central Intelligence Agency

- Seal of the Central Intelligence Agency

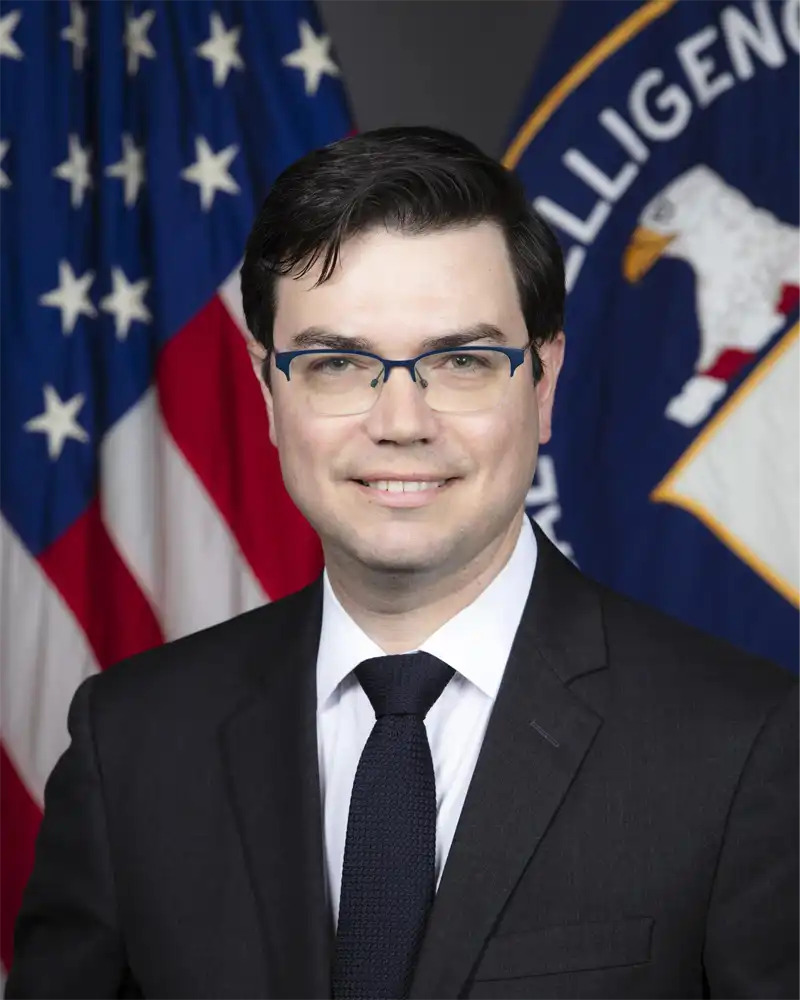
- Incumbent; Michael Ellis since February 10, 2025
- Central Intelligence Agency
- Reports to: Director of the Central Intelligence Agency (D/CIA)
- Seat: George Bush Center for Intelligence, Langley, Fairfax County, Virginia, U.S.
- Appointer: President of the United States, with advice from D/CIA
- Term length: No fixed term
- Constituting instrument: 50 U.S.C. § 3037
- Precursor: Deputy Director of Central Intelligence
- Inaugural holder: VADM Albert M. Calland, USN
- Formation: December 17, 2004
- Deputy: Chief Operating Officer of the Central Intelligence Agency (COO/CIA)
- Salary: Executive Schedule, Level III
- Website: cia.gov

The deputy director of the Central Intelligence Agency (DD/CIA) is a statutory office (50 U.S.C. § 3037) and the second-highest official of the Central Intelligence Agency. The DD/CIA assists the director of the Central Intelligence Agency (D/CIA) and is authorized to exercise the powers of the D/CIA when the director's position is vacant or in the director's absence or disability.

Under current law, the deputy director is appointed by the president of the United States and is not required to be confirmed by the United States Senate.

== History ==
The functions of this position were served by the deputy director of central intelligence (DDCI) until that position was abolished under the Intelligence Reform and Terrorism Prevention Act of 2004. The position of DD/CIA was created administratively by then-D/CIA Porter Goss and received statutory approval from the U.S. Congress in 2010.

The first DDCI was Kingman Douglass, appointed by the director of central intelligence in 1946, managing the Central Intelligence Group (CIG). With the passage of the National Security Act of 1947, the CIG was merged into the CIA. Thus, the position of DDCI predates the creation of the CIA.

In April 1953, Congress amended the National Security Act of 1947 to allow the president of the United States to appoint the DDCI (with U.S. Senate confirmation). The amendment stipulated that the director and deputy director positions could not be simultaneously filled by military officers.

== List of deputy directors of central intelligence (1946–2004) ==
No.	Portrait	Deputy Director of Central Intelligence	Took office	Left office	Time in office	President serving under
1	Kingman Douglass	Kingman Douglass (1896–1971)	March 2, 1946	July 11, 1946	131 days	Harry S. Truman
—	Vacant	Vacant	July 11, 1946	January 20, 1947	193 days	Harry S. Truman
2	Edwin Kennedy Wright	Brigadier General; Edwin Kennedy Wright (United States Army) (1898–1983)	January 20, 1947	March 9, 1949	2 years, 48 days	Harry S. Truman
—	Vacant	Vacant	March 10, 1949	October 7, 1950	1 year, 211 days	Harry S. Truman
3	William Harding Jackson	William Harding Jackson (1901–1971)	October 7, 1950	August 3, 1951	300 days	Harry S. Truman
4	Allen Dulles	Allen Dulles (1893–1969)	August 23, 1951	February 26, 1953	1 year, 187 days	Harry S. Truman; Dwight D. Eisenhower
5	Charles P. Cabell	General; Charles P. Cabell (United States Air Force) (1903–1971)	April 23, 1953	January 31, 1962	8 years, 283 days	Dwight D. Eisenhower; John F. Kennedy
6	Marshall Carter	Lieutenant General; Marshall Carter (United States Army) (1909–1993)	April 3, 1962	April 28, 1965	3 years, 25 days	John F. Kennedy; Lyndon B. Johnson
7	Richard Helms	Richard Helms (1913–2002)	April 28, 1965	June 30, 1966	1 year, 63 days	Lyndon B. Johnson
8	Rufus Lackland Taylor	Vice Admiral; Rufus Lackland Taylor (United States Navy) (1910–1978)	October 13, 1966	February 1, 1969	2 years, 111 days	Lyndon B. Johnson; Richard M. Nixon
9	Robert E. Cushman Jr.	General; Robert E. Cushman Jr. (United States Marine Corps) (1914–1985)	May 7, 1969	December 31, 1971	2 years, 238 days	Richard M. Nixon
10	Vernon A. Walters	General; Vernon A. Walters (United States Army) (1917–2002)	May 2, 1972	July 2, 1976	4 years, 61 days	Richard M. Nixon; Gerald R. Ford
11	E. Henry Knoche	E. Henry Knoche (1925–2010)	July 7, 1976	August 1, 1977	1 year, 25 days	Gerald R. Ford; Jimmy Carter
—	John F. Blake	John F. Blake (1922–1995)	August 1, 1977	February 10, 1978	193 days	Jimmy Carter
12	Frank Carlucci	Frank Carlucci (1930–2018)	February 10, 1978	February 5, 1981	2 years, 361 days	Jimmy Carter; Ronald Reagan
13	Bobby Ray Inman	Admiral; Bobby Ray Inman (United States Navy) (1931–2026)	February 12, 1981	June 10, 1982	1 year, 118 days	Ronald Reagan
14	John N. McMahon	John N. McMahon (born 1929)	June 10, 1982	March 29, 1986	3 years, 292 days	Ronald Reagan
15	Robert Gates	Robert Gates (born 1943)	April 18, 1986	March 20, 1989	2 years, 336 days	Ronald Reagan; George H. W. Bush
16	Richard James Kerr	Richard James Kerr (born 1935)	March 20, 1989	March 2, 1992	2 years, 348 days	George H.W. Bush
17	Bill Studeman	Admiral; Bill Studeman (United States Navy) (born 1940)	April 9, 1992	July 3, 1995	3 years, 85 days	George H.W. Bush; Bill Clinton
18	George Tenet	George Tenet (born 1953)	July 3, 1995	July 11, 1997	2 years, 8 days	Bill Clinton
19	John A. Gordon	General; John A. Gordon (United States Air Force) (1946–2020)	October 31, 1997	June 29, 2000	2 years, 242 days	Bill Clinton
20	John E. McLaughlin	John E. McLaughlin (born 1942)	October 19, 2000	December 3, 2004	4 years, 45 days	Bill Clinton; George W. Bush

== Deputy Director of the Central Intelligence Agency (2004–present) ==
Hereafter the deputy director of central intelligence position was replaced by the deputy director of the Central Intelligence Agency and the principal deputy director of national intelligence.

No.	Deputy Director of the CIA	Tenure	President(s) served under
Position succeeded the deputy director of central intelligence
Vacant		December 3, 2004 – July 15, 2005	George W. Bush
1	VADM Albert Calland, USN	July 15, 2005 – July 23, 2006	George W. Bush
2	Stephen Kappes	July 24, 2006 – May 5, 2010	George W. Bush; Barack Obama
3	Michael Morell	May 7, 2010 – August 9, 2013	Barack Obama
4	Avril Haines	August 9, 2013 – January 10, 2015	Barack Obama
5	David S. Cohen	February 9, 2015 – January 20, 2017	Barack Obama
6	Gina Haspel	February 2, 2017 – May 21, 2018	Donald Trump
Vacant		May 21, 2018 – August 1, 2018	Donald Trump
7	Vaughn Bishop	August 1, 2018 – January 20, 2021	Donald Trump
8	David S. Cohen	January 20, 2021 – January 20, 2025	Joe Biden
Vacant		January 20, 2025 – February 10, 2025	Donald Trump
9	Michael Ellis	February 10, 2025 – present	Donald Trump

== In popular culture ==
In the novel The Hunt for Red October, the character Vice Admiral James Greer is the fictional deputy director of the CIA; former U.S. marine Jack Ryan takes over this role after Admiral Greer's death in Clear and Present Danger. He subsequently retires from the position following a highly publicized media scandal and the detonation of a nuclear weapon at the Super Bowl in The Sum of All Fears.

In the animated sitcom American Dad!, the character Avery Bullock is the fictional deputy director of the CIA.

In the video game Call of Duty: Black Ops 6, the character Daniel Livingstone is the fictional deputy director of the CIA.

In the TV series The Boys, the character Susan L. Raynor is the fictional deputy director of the CIA.
