= List of honorary fellows of St Antony's College, Oxford =

This is a list of Honorary Fellows of St Antony's College, University of Oxford.

- Sir Mark Allen
- Nayef Al-Rodhan
- Hanan Ashrawi
- Aung San Suu Kyi
- Sir Raymond Carr
- Peter Carington, 6th Baron Carrington
- Sir Bryan Cartledge
- Sir James Craig
- Norman Davies
- Guido di Tella
- Thomas Friedman
- Sir Alistair Horne
- Michael Ignatieff
- Jin Yong
- Bridget Kendall
- Paul Kennedy
- Nemir Kirdar
- Jürgen Kocka
- Sir Michael Llewellyn-Smith
- Wm. Roger Louis
- Margaret MacMillan
- José María Maravall Herrero
- David Marquand
- Sadako Ogata
- Christopher Patten, Baron Patten of Barnes
- Sigrid Rausing
- Gerhard A. Ritter
- Sir Adam Roberts
- Nemak Shafik, Baroness Shafik
- Alfred Stepan
- Sir John Swire
- Romila Thapar
- Richard von Weizsäcker
- Sir Denis Wright
