= Albert M. Calland III =

US Navy admiral and Navy SEAL (1952–2023)

Albert M. Calland
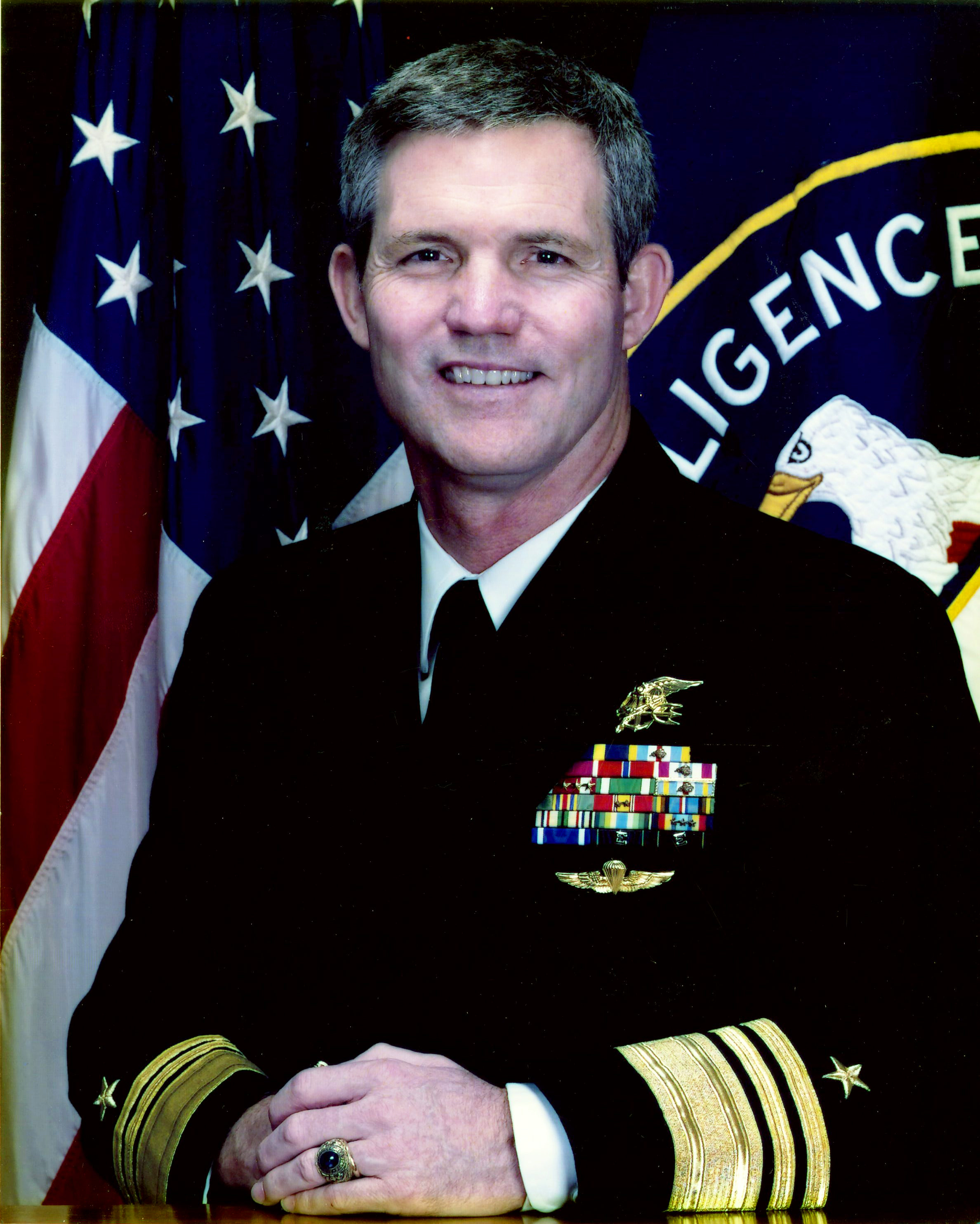
- Calland in the mid-2000s
- Born: July 30, 1952; Zanesville, Ohio, U.S.
- Died: March 31, 2023 (aged 70)
- Burial place: United States Naval Academy Cemetery
- Military career
- Allegiance: United States
- Branch: United States Navy
- Service years: 1974–2007
- Rank: Vice admiral
- Commands: Naval Special Warfare Development Group; Naval Special Warfare Command; SEAL Team One
- Awards: Navy Distinguished Service Medal; Defense Superior Service Medal (2); Legion of Merit; Bronze Star Medal

Albert Melrose Calland III (July 30, 1952 – March 31, 2023) was a vice admiral in the United States Navy who was the deputy director for Strategic Operational Planning at the National Counterterrorism Center and commander of Naval Special Warfare Command from 2002 to 2004. He also previously served as deputy director of the Central Intelligence Agency from July 2005 to July 2006 and commanded the Naval Special Warfare Development Group from 1997 to 1999.

Calland was a commander of Seal Team Six and was the first U.S. military flag officer to set foot in Afghanistan after the September 11 attacks.

== Naval career ==
Calland graduated from the United States Naval Academy with a Bachelor of Science degree in 1974 and received a commission as an ensign in the United States Navy. Calland received orders to Basic Underwater Demolition/SEAL training (BUD/S) at Naval Amphibious Base Coronado. After six months of training, Calland graduated with BUD/S class 82 in June 1975. His first operational assignment was with Underwater Demolition Team ELEVEN (UDT-11). Following SEAL Basic Indoctrination and completion of a six month probationary period, he received the 1130 designator as a Naval Special Warfare Officer, entitled to wear the Special Warfare insignia. Calland served as assistant platoon commander of a SEAL Delivery Vehicle (SDV) platoon till 1977. He later served as platoon commander at SEAL TEAM ONE from 1977 to 1981, phase instructor at BUD/S Training from 1981 to 1983, research, development and acquisition officer at Naval Special Warfare Group 1, and Naval Special Warfare/Explosive Ordnance Disposal Officer at Naval Surface Forces Pacific. Calland served as executive officer of Special Boat Unit 12 from 1986 to Apr 1988. He deployed as part of Operation Earnest Will in the Persian Gulf. Following his XO tour Calland was assigned as assistant chief of staff for research, development and acquisition at Naval Special Warfare Command from April 1988 to May 1990. He served at US Special Operations Command (SOCOM) at Tampa, FL from 1990 to November 1993. Calland became commanding officer of SEAL Team ONE from 1993 until January 1995. He later earned a Master of Science degree in national resource strategy from the Industrial College of the Armed Forces in 1996 followed by assignment as director of operations at Joint Special Operations Command. From June 1997 until June 1999, Calland commanded the Naval Special Warfare Development Group. Calland was the commanding officer of Special Operations Command Central (SOCCENT), part of United States Central Command, and as such, commanded efforts in Afghanistan in 2001 during Operation Enduring Freedom. Between August 2002 and March 2004, Calland served as the commanding officer of the Naval Special Warfare Command. Calland's career at the Central Intelligence Agency began with his appointment to the position of associate director of Central Intelligence for military support in March 2004, a position he filled until his appointment as deputy director. Calland resigned from that position upon the confirmation of CIA Director General Michael Hayden, as a 1953 amendment to the National Security Act of 1947 prevents the director and deputy director from serving in the military simultaneously.

After leaving the CIA, Calland served for a year as deputy director for strategic operational planning at the National Counterterrorism Center (NCTC). He retired from the navy on July 1, 2007, after 33 years of service, becoming executive vice president for security and intelligence integration with CACI International Inc.

Calland died on March 31, 2023, from long-term health complications caused by injuries sustained during his military service. He was 70. Calland is interred at the United States Naval Academy Cemetery.

=== Awards and decorations ===
U.S. military decorations
Defense Distinguished Service Medal
Navy Distinguished Service Medal
Defense Superior Service Medal (two awards)
Legion of Merit
Bronze Star Medal
Defense Meritorious Service Medal w/ bronze oak leave cluster
Meritorious Service Medal w/ four 5/16 inch stars
Navy and Marine Corps Commendation Medal
Joint Meritorious Unit Award w/ two bronze oak leave clusters
Navy Meritorious Unit Commendation
U.S. Service (Campaign) Medals and Service and Training Ribbons
National Defense Service Medal (with two bronze campaign stars)
Armed Forces Expeditionary Medal w/ bronze star
Southwest Asia Service Medal
Armed Forces Service Medal
Humanitarian Service Medal
Global War on Terrorism Expeditionary Medal
Global War on Terrorism Service Medal
Navy Sea Service Deployment Ribbon
Navy and Marine Corps Overseas Service Ribbon with three bronze service stars
NATO medal for the former Yugoslavia
Navy Rifle Marksmanship Badge
Navy Pistol Marksmanship Badge

U.S. badges, patches and tabs
SEAL Trident
Navy and Marine Corps Parachutist Insignia
United States Special Operations Command Badge
United States Central Command Badge

Government offices
Preceded by John Edward McLaughlin	Deputy Director of the Central Intelligence Agency; 2005–2006	Succeeded by Stephen R. Kappes
