= James Cotsana =

- Occupation: Spy
- Known for: alleged to have played a role in developing the CIA torture program

James Cotsana is a security consultant, and former official of the Central Intelligence Agency whose testimony has been sought over how the CIA authorized, and implemented the clandestine use of torture, in its network of secret interrogation sites, commonly known as "black sites".

Prior to joining the CIA Cotsana served as an infantry officer. He saw wartime service during the War in Vietnam. Cotsana spent 26 years in the CIA's "Directorate of Operations", the division that runs clandestine human sources, and covert paramilitary operations.

In October 2012, Cotsana delivered a lecture to the Maine chapter of the Association of Former Intelligence Officers. A poster advertising the talk said its topic was to be "the truth behind CIA's detention and interrogation program". The poster stated:

"With his twenty-six years of experience in CIA’s Directorate of Operations and Directorate of Science and Technology, James Cotsana is well qualified to speak on the issue. As a department chief at the Counterintelligence Center he established and oversaw a highly successful program focused on identifying and disrupting terrorist plans and plots while identifying methods of operation."

== Torture controversy ==
In 2014 the American Civil Liberties Union helped three former CIA captives sue Jessen and Mitchell. Jessen and Mitchell sought the testimony of Cotsana and a colleague Gina Haspel.

Spencer Ackerman, writing in The Guardian, reported that the Department of Justice's assertion of state-secrets privilege as the first since President Donald Trump's inauguration.

Thomas Clouse, writing in the Spokane Review, reported that Jessen and Mitchell sought Cotsana and Haspel's testimony to show that they developed the torture program at the specific request of the US government, so the responsibility for the torture fell on the government, not on the program's designers.

On March 24, 2017, Associated Press reporter Nicholas K. Geranios wrote that their judge had postponed their testimony until September, to give the Department of Justice a chance to explain why their testimony should be barred.
