= Mark Allen (businessman) =

British diplomat, intelligence officer and businessman (born 1950)

- Born: 3 July 1950 (age 76)
- Education: Dragon School; Downside School; Exeter College, Oxford
- Occupations: Intelligence officer, businessman, lecturer
- Spouse: Margaret Mary Watson
- Parent: Peter Muir Spurgeon Allen

Sir Mark John Spurgeon Allen KCMG (born 3 July 1950) is a British diplomat, intelligence officer, and businessman.

== Early life ==
Mark Allen was born on 3 July 1950. His father, Peter Muir Spurgeon Allen, was headmaster of Cokethorpe School in Oxfordshire. He was educated at the Dragon School, Oxford, and at Downside School, the Roman Catholic public school in Somerset. He then read Arabic and Turkish at Exeter College, University of Oxford.

== Career ==
Allen joined the British Foreign Service, where he worked for 30 years. After studying at the Middle East Centre for Arab Studies, he was posted to Abu Dhabi in 1974. There he developed his love of falconry from his contacts with the Bedouin, to the extent that he wrote a series of books on the subject, including Falconry in Arabia (1980). He then spent much of the rest of his operational career in the Middle East.

In 2003, as head of MI6’s counter-terrorism unit, Allen and Stephen Kappes of the CIA led talks that resulted in an end of support for terrorist activity by Colonel Muammar al-Gaddafi and of international sanctions against Libya.

Confidential documents discovered by Human Rights Watch in Libyan Government offices, following the fall of the Gaddafi regime, suggested the involvement of the British Government in rendition operations. These included a fax apparently sent from Sir Mark to the Libyan authorities in March 2004, saying:

"I congratulate you on the safe arrival of [Mr Belhaj]. This was the least we could do for you and for Libya to demonstrate the remarkable relationship we have built over recent years.....Amusingly, we got a request from the Americans to channel requests for information from [Mr Belhaj] through the Americans. I have no intention of doing any such thing. The intelligence about [Mr Belhaj] was British... I feel I have the right to deal with you direct on this”.

After losing out to John Scarlett in his bid to become head of MI6, in which he was supported by his friend Jack Straw, Allen resigned in 2004.

After a six-month sabbatical, Allen became a senior advisor to the Monitor Group, a global consulting and private equity firm. He was also approved by the Cabinet Office and then UK Prime Minister Tony Blair to be allowed to work immediately as a special advisor for BP. Allen used his contacts in both the United Kingdom and Libya to resolve the issues surrounding the release of Abdelbaset Ali al-Megrahi in relation to the Lockerbie bombing. Allen developed his relationships with the Libyan regime through Gaddafi's son Saif al-Islam, who studied for a Ph.D. at the London School of Economics. BP later signed a £15 billion contract with Libya for a joint venture in oil exploration and extraction. In 2010, he was requested to appear before the US Senate committee investigating the release of al-Megrahi in relation to BP's oil deal, something which as an advisor to BP he was blocked from doing. In 2007, he helped broker the release of Bulgarian nurses imprisoned in Libya on charges of having injected HIV virus into children.

On 6 September 2011, The Independent newspaper claimed that Allen had been implicated in the arrest of Abdelhakim Belhaj in March 2004 in Thailand, and the subsequent torture of Belhaj by Gaddafi's regime in Abu Salim prison in Tripoli, Libya. In 2014 Britain's Crown Prosecution Service decided not to charge Allen for his role, on the grounds they had insufficient evidence, even though the Metropolitan Police had provided them with a 28,000 page dossier. In October 2016 Belhadj appealed the dismissal. Belhadj's appeal relies on communication from Allen, found in the offices of Moussa Koussa the head of Muammar Gaddafi's Intelligence service, after those offices were stormed by opposition forces, when Gaddafi was overthrown.

Allen is a Senior Associate and honorary fellow of St Antony's College, Oxford, and is a member of the board of the Hospital of St John and St Elizabeth in St John's Wood, London.

== Personal life ==
Allen married Margaret Mary Watson in 1976 and has two children. He was inducted into the Order of St Michael and St George in 2002, and knighted in 2005. A devout Roman Catholic who has edited a book of prayers for the young, he lives in Westminster.

== Books ==
- Arabs: A New Perspective, Continuum International Publishing Group, 2006.
- With Hossein Amirsadeghi, Sky Hunters: The Passion of Falconry, Thames & Hudson, 24 November 2008
- Tribes: Tribalism in the Arab World, Continuum International Publishing Group, due October 2009.
- First Holy Communion: With a foreword by His Excellency Archbishop Giovanni Tonucci
