= John E. McLaughlin =

American intelligence official

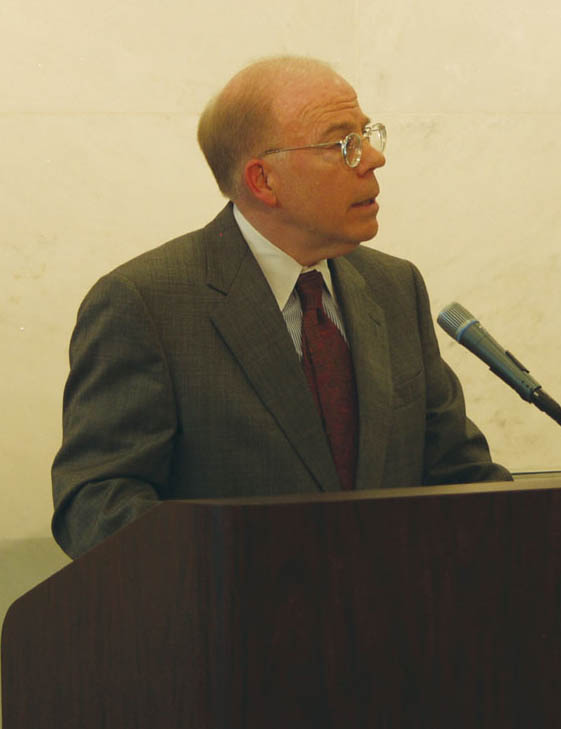

Acting Director of Central Intelligence
- In office July 12, 2004 – September 24, 2004
- President: George W. Bush
- Preceded by: George Tenet
- Succeeded by: Porter Goss

21st Deputy Director of Central Intelligence
- In office October 19, 2000 – December 3, 2004
- President: Bill Clinton; George W. Bush
- Preceded by: John Gordon
- Succeeded by: Albert Calland

Personal details
- Born: John Edward McLaughlin; June 15, 1942 (age 84) McKeesport, Pennsylvania, U.S.
- Education: Wittenberg University (BA); University of Pennsylvania; Johns Hopkins University (MA)

John Edward McLaughlin (born June 15, 1942) is a retired American intelligence official who was Deputy Director of Central Intelligence and briefly acting Director of Central Intelligence.

He is currently a Senior Fellow and Distinguished Practitioner-in-Residence at the Philip Merrill Center for Strategic Studies at the Paul H. Nitze School of Advanced International Studies (SAIS) of the Johns Hopkins University. Additionally, he is a professional magician and a founding member of Washington Magic, an ensemble show performed in Washington D.C.

== Life and career ==
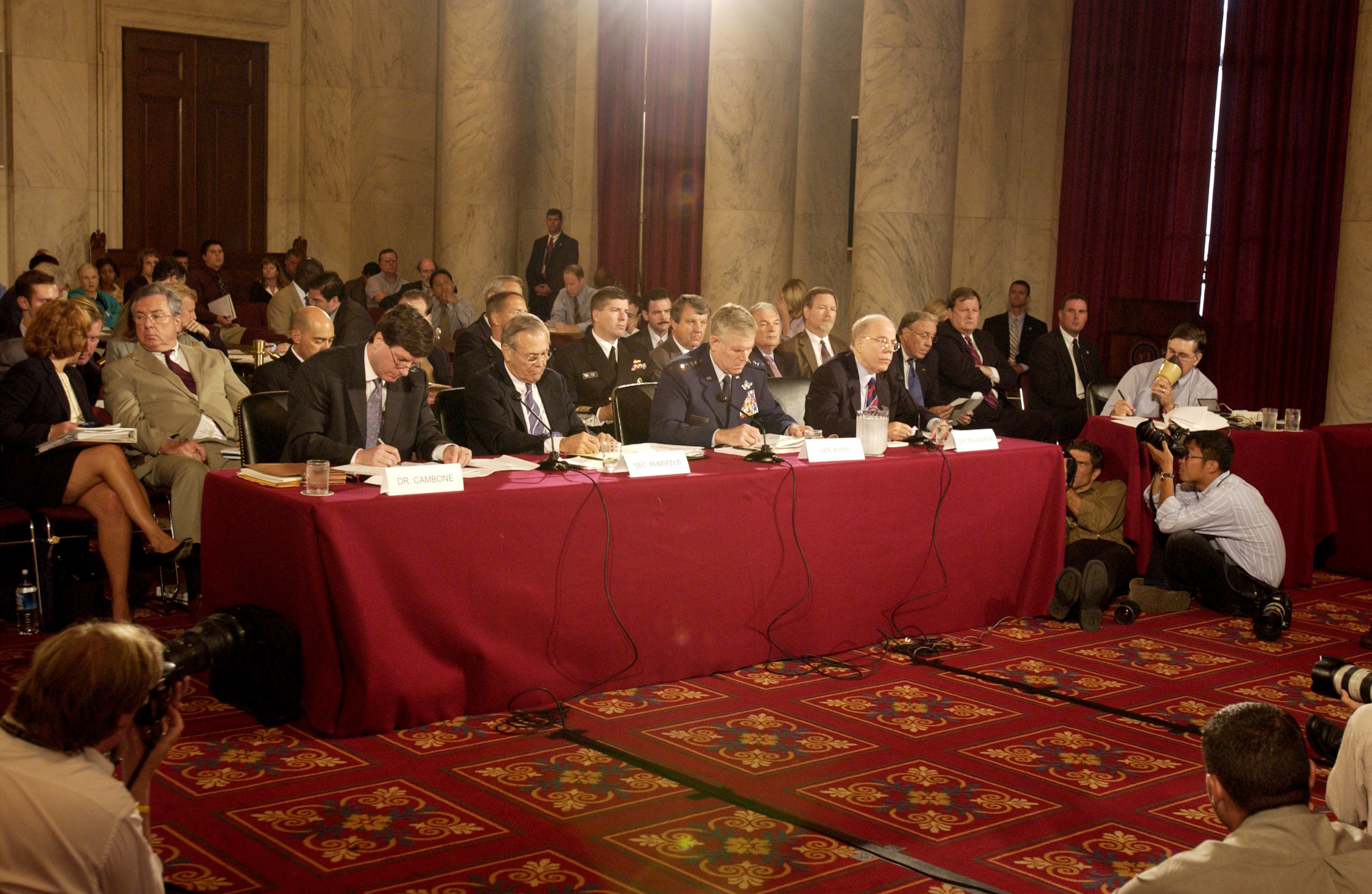
McLaughlin during his tenure as Acting Director of Central Intelligence during a testimony at Senate Armed Services Committee with Secretary of Defense Donald H. Rumsfeld, Chairman of the Joint Chiefs of Staff General Richard B. Myers, and Undersecretary of Defense for Intelligence Stephen A. Cambone on August 17, 2004.

McLaughlin was born in McKeesport, Pennsylvania. In 1964, McLaughlin received a bachelor of arts degree from Wittenberg University in Springfield, Ohio. He was a member of the Beta Iota chapter of Delta Sigma Phi. He completed graduate work in comparative politics (ABD) at the University of Pennsylvania. In 1966 he earned a master of arts degree in international relations from the Paul H. Nitze School of Advanced International Studies (SAIS) of the Johns Hopkins University. After graduating from SAIS, he served as a U.S. Army officer from 1966 to 1969, completing a tour in Vietnam from 1968 to 1969. In 2001, he returned to Wittenberg to speak at the commencement ceremony.

McLaughlin's CIA career lasted more than 30 years, starting in 1972 with a focus on European, Russian, and Eurasian issues at the Directorate of Intelligence. He had multiple assignments ranging from analyst, branch chief, division chief, task force leader, and presidential briefer.

From 1984 to 1985, he served a rotational tour as an Executive analyst at the State Department in the Bureau of European and Canadian Affairs. He returned to CIA and served as Deputy Director and Director of the Office of European Analysis from 1985 to 1992; Director of Slavic and Eurasian Analysis from 1992 to 1997; Deputy Director for Intelligence, Vice Chairman for Estimates of the National Intelligence Council, and Acting Chairman of the National Intelligence Council from 1995 to 1997; and Deputy Director for Intelligence from 1997 to 2000.

While Deputy Director for Intelligence from 1997 to 2000, he created the Senior Analytic Service, a career track that enables CIA analysts to rise to senior rank without working in management. He also founded the Sherman Kent School for Intelligence Analysis, an institution dedicated to teaching the history, mission, and skills of the analytic profession to new CIA employees.

President Bill Clinton designated McLaughlin as the Acting Deputy Director of Central Intelligence on June 28, 2000, and later nominated him for the position. McLaughlin was unanimously confirmed as the Deputy Director of Central Intelligence by the Senate on October 18, 2000. Director of Central Intelligence George J. Tenet swore in McLaughlin as the Deputy Director of Central Intelligence on October 19, 2000.

After Tenet's resignation on June 3, 2004, the Bush Administration announced that McLaughlin would serve as Acting Director after Tenet's departure on July 11, 2004. McLaughlin himself stepped down as Acting Director on September 24, 2004, after Porter J. Goss was confirmed by the Senate to serve as the new director. He then returned to his position as Deputy Director, and announced his retirement on November 12, 2004.

McLaughlin currently serves as a Senior Fellow and Distinguished Practitioner-in-Residence at the Philip Merrill Center for Strategic Studies at the Johns Hopkins University Paul H. Nitze School of Advanced International Studies (SAIS) in Washington, D.C. He also serves on the Guiding Coalition of the Project on National Security Reform. In 2005, he was named a nonresident senior fellow at the Brookings Institution.

On January 8, 2010, Director of National Intelligence Dennis C. Blair announced that he had appointed McLaughlin to head a group of experts to investigate the December 2009 bombing attempt by alleged terrorist Umar Farouk Abdulmutallab aboard Northwest Airlines Flight 253, and the November 2009 Fort Hood shooting, carried out by Army Maj. Nidal Hasan. The group was tasked with making proposals to remedy weaknesses in intelligence systems and procedures that the incidents exposed.

In October 2020, McLaughlin signed a letter stating the Biden laptop story "has the classic earmarks of a Russian information operation".

Government offices
| Preceded by John Gordon | Deputy Director of Central Intelligence; 2000–2004 | Succeeded by Albert Calland |
| Preceded by George Tenet | Acting Director of Central Intelligence; 2004 | Succeeded by Porter Goss |
