= George Tenet =

Central Intelligence Agency director from 1996 to 2004

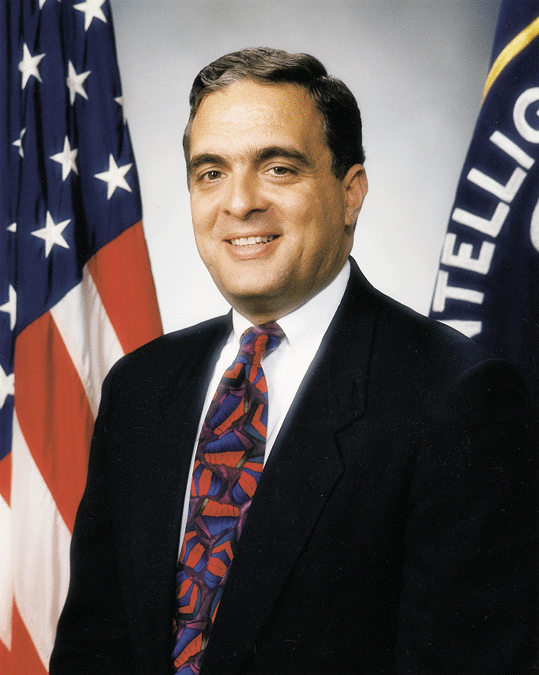

18th Director of Central Intelligence
- In office July 11, 1997 – July 11, 2004; Acting: December 16, 1996 – July 11, 1997
- President: Bill Clinton; George W. Bush
- Deputy: John A. Gordon; John E. McLaughlin
- Preceded by: John M. Deutch
- Succeeded by: Porter Goss

19th Deputy Director of Central Intelligence
- In office July 3, 1995 – July 11, 1997
- President: Bill Clinton
- Preceded by: William O. Studeman
- Succeeded by: John A. Gordon

Personal details
- Born: George John Tenet; January 5, 1953 (age 73) Flushing, New York City, U.S.
- Spouse: Stephanie Glakas
- Children: 1
- Education: Georgetown University (BS); Columbia University (MIA)
- Tenet's voice Tenet testifies on coordination between the intelligence community and a proposed homeland security department Recorded June 27, 2002

George John Tenet (born January 5, 1953) is an American intelligence official and academic who served as the director of central intelligence (DCI) for the United States Central Intelligence Agency, as well as a distinguished professor in the practice of diplomacy at Georgetown University.

Tenet held the position as the DCI from July 1997 to July 2004, making him the second-longest-serving director in the agency's history—behind Allen Dulles—as well as one of the few DCIs to serve under two U.S. presidents of opposing political parties. He played a key role in overseeing intelligence regarding weapons of mass destruction in advance of the Iraq War. A 2005 Inspector General's report found that Tenet bears "ultimate responsibility" for the United States intelligence community's failure to develop a plan to control al-Qaeda in the lead-up to 9/11. Tenet has been criticized for personally authorizing the CIA's use of brutal and ineffective torture techniques during his tenure, in contravention of international law, something which he has repeatedly denied.

In February 2008, he became a managing director at investment bank Allen & Company.

== Early life and education ==
George John Tenet was born on January 5, 1953, in Flushing, New York City, the son of Greek immigrants Evangelia and John Tenet. His father was from the ethnic Greek community of Chimara, in Albania, and worked in a coal mine in France before arriving in the United States via Ellis Island, just before the Great Depression. His mother was from Epirus, Greece; she had fled from the communist guerillas by stowing away on a Royal Navy submarine.

Tenet was raised in Little Neck, Queens, where, as a teenager, he and his older brother Bill worked as busboys in their family's diner, the Twentieth Century Diner. Despite Bill and George being fraternal twins, they had very different personalities; in his book Ghost Wars, Steve Coll described Bill as "reserved, precise, and studious" (he would later become a cardiologist) and George as "loud, sloppy, and boisterous". Because of his tendency to talk a lot, he was known as "the mouthpiece". He was also interested in the news; the host of a local current affairs host sent him an autograph in response to Tenet's letters, calling him "the future editorial page editor of The New York Times". He played basketball and softball for his Greek Orthodox church, where he was also an altar server.

Tenet attended Public School 94, where he was president of his sixth grade class; Junior High School 67; and Benjamin N. Cardozo High School. In high school he played soccer and edited the school newspaper, graduating in 1971. After studying at the State University of New York at Cortland, Tenet graduated from the Georgetown University School of Foreign Service in 1976 with a Bachelor of Science in Foreign Service (B.S.F.S.) and received a Master of International Affairs degree from Columbia University in 1978.

== Early career ==
Tenet's first job after graduating from Columbia University was research director of the American Hellenic Institute from 1978 to 1979. Next, he worked for the Solar Energy Industries Association as Director of International Programs until 1982. He then began working for the Senate, first as a legislative assistant and later as legislative director to then–Pennsylvania Senator H. John Heinz III from 1982 to 1985. He was a staff member of the Senate Select Committee on Intelligence (SSCI) from 1985 to 1988, then Staff Director of the SSCI from 1988 to 1993. Tenet joined President-elect Bill Clinton's national security transition team in November 1992. Clinton appointed Tenet Senior Director for Intelligence Programs at the National Security Council, where he served from 1993 to 1995.

Tenet was implicated in an illegal wiretapping case brought by Richard Horn. The CIA invoked the state secrets privilege to force dismissal of the case. It was later reopened and settled out of court, but during the court proceedings, the judge ruled that several people including Tenet committed fraud.

== CIA career ==
Tenet was appointed Deputy Director of Central Intelligence in July 1995. After John Deutch's abrupt resignation in December 1996, Tenet served as acting director. This was followed by the reluctant withdrawal of Anthony Lake, after it became apparent to Lake that his nomination had been successfully blocked by Republicans in Congress. Tenet was then officially appointed Director on July 11, 1997, after a unanimous confirmation vote in the Senate.

While the Director of Central Intelligence has been replaced by an incoming administration since Jimmy Carter replaced DCI George H. W. Bush, Tenet served through the end of the Clinton administration and well into the first term of George W. Bush. In 1999, Tenet declined to reveal the overall budget for intelligence operations (including the CIA) which was a departure from his release the previous two years. This later led to criticism from government transparency advocates.

Tenet embarked on a mission to re-energize the CIA, which had experienced a relative loss of status following the end of the Cold War. The number of agents recruited each year had fallen to an all-time low, a 25% decline from the Cold War peak. Tenet appealed to the original mission of the agency, which had been to "prevent another Pearl Harbor", i.e. to predict where danger might come from in the post–Cold War world. Tenet focused on potential problems such as "the transformation of Russia and China", "rogue states" like North Korea, Iran, and Iraq, and terrorism.

=== 1999 bombing of the Chinese embassy in Belgrade ===
On May 7, 1999, during the Kosovo War, U.S. bombers accidentally struck the Chinese embassy in Belgrade, Serbia with five JDAM precision guided bombs, killing three Chinese reporters and injuring 20 others. In testimony before a congressional committee, Tenet later admitted the strike was the only one in the campaign organized and directed by his agency, though he still claimed it was not deliberate. Later analysis has suggested that a 100-yard (91 m) error in a military targeting database maintained by the Pentagon was not corrected or updated in a timely manner and that other systems intended to prevent such incidents failed to perform as expected. As a result of this and other incidents, systematic changes were made to pre-strike Rules of Engagement for U.S. pilots, including checklists verifying target information and coordinates. China has never accepted the United States' version of events, although Tenet in a published work noted in a bit of black humor that in the prelude to the bombing of Iraq, China had, through unofficial channels, provided the Agency with the exact GPS coordinates of their Embassy in Baghdad so as to ensure the CIA knew the precise location.

=== Israeli–Palestinian ceasefire ===
In 2001, Tenet brokered a short-lived Israeli-Palestinian ceasefire.

=== Opposition to release of Pollard ===
Tenet strongly opposed releasing convicted spy Jonathan Pollard, going so far as threatening to resign if then President Clinton pardoned him.

=== Al-Qaeda and the war on terror ===
By 1999, al-Qaeda had emerged as a significant terrorist threat. The 1998 bombings of two U.S. African embassies were the latest in a string of attacks on American interests in the west Indian Ocean region. In 2000, the USS Cole was bombed in Aden in an attempt to sink her, killing 17 naval personnel.

==== Bin Laden Plan ====
In 1999, Tenet put forward a "Plan" for dealing with al-Qaeda. In preparation, he selected new leadership for the CIA's Counterterrorist Center (CTC). He placed Cofer Black in charge of the CTC, and Richard Blee in charge of the CTC's Bin Laden unit. Tenet assigned the CTC to develop the Plan. The proposals, brought out in September, sought to penetrate Qaeda's "Afghan sanctuary" with U.S. and Afghan agents, in order to obtain information on and mount operations against Bin Laden's network. In October, officers from the Bin Laden unit visited northern Afghanistan. Once the Plan was finalized, the Agency created a "Qaeda cell" (whose functions overlapped those of the CTC's Bin Laden unit) to give operational leadership to the effort.

The CIA concentrated its inadequate financial resources on the Plan, so that at least some of its more modest aspirations were realized. Intelligence collection efforts on bin Laden and al-Qaeda increased significantly from 1999 onward. "By 9/11", said Tenet, "a map would show that these collection programs and human [reporting] networks were in place in such numbers as to nearly cover Afghanistan" although Bin Laden's inner circle was not included.

Contrary to the 2005 Inspector General's report, George Tenet had in fact reported the potential threat to then national security advisor Condoleezza Rice during an urgent meeting on July 10, 2001, in which his team informed her that "There will be significant terrorist attacks against the United States in the coming weeks or months."

==== Predator drone ====
The CIA experimented with a small remote-controlled reconnaissance aircraft, the Predator, to try to spot Bin Laden in Afghanistan. A series of flights in autumn 2000, overseen by CTC officials and flown by USAF drone pilots from a control room at the CIA's Langley headquarters, produced probable sightings of the al-Qaeda leader.

Cofer Black and others became advocates of arming the Predator with adapted Hellfire anti-tank missiles to try to kill Bin Laden and other al-Qaeda leaders in targeted killings. But there were both legal and technical issues. Tenet in particular was concerned about the CIA moving back into the business of targeted killing. A series of live-fire tests in the Great Basin Desert in Nevada in summer 2001 produced mixed results.

Tenet advised cautiously on the matter at a meeting of the Cabinet-level Principals Committee on September 4, 2001. If the Cabinet wanted to empower the CIA to field a lethal drone, Tenet said, "they should do so with their eyes wide open, fully aware of the potential fallout if there were a controversial or mistaken strike". National Security Adviser Condoleezza Rice concluded that the armed Predator was required, but not ready. It was agreed to recommend to the CIA to resume reconnaissance flights. The "previously reluctant" Tenet then ordered the Agency to do so. The CIA was authorized to "deploy the system with weapons-capable aircraft".

==== September 11 attacks ====
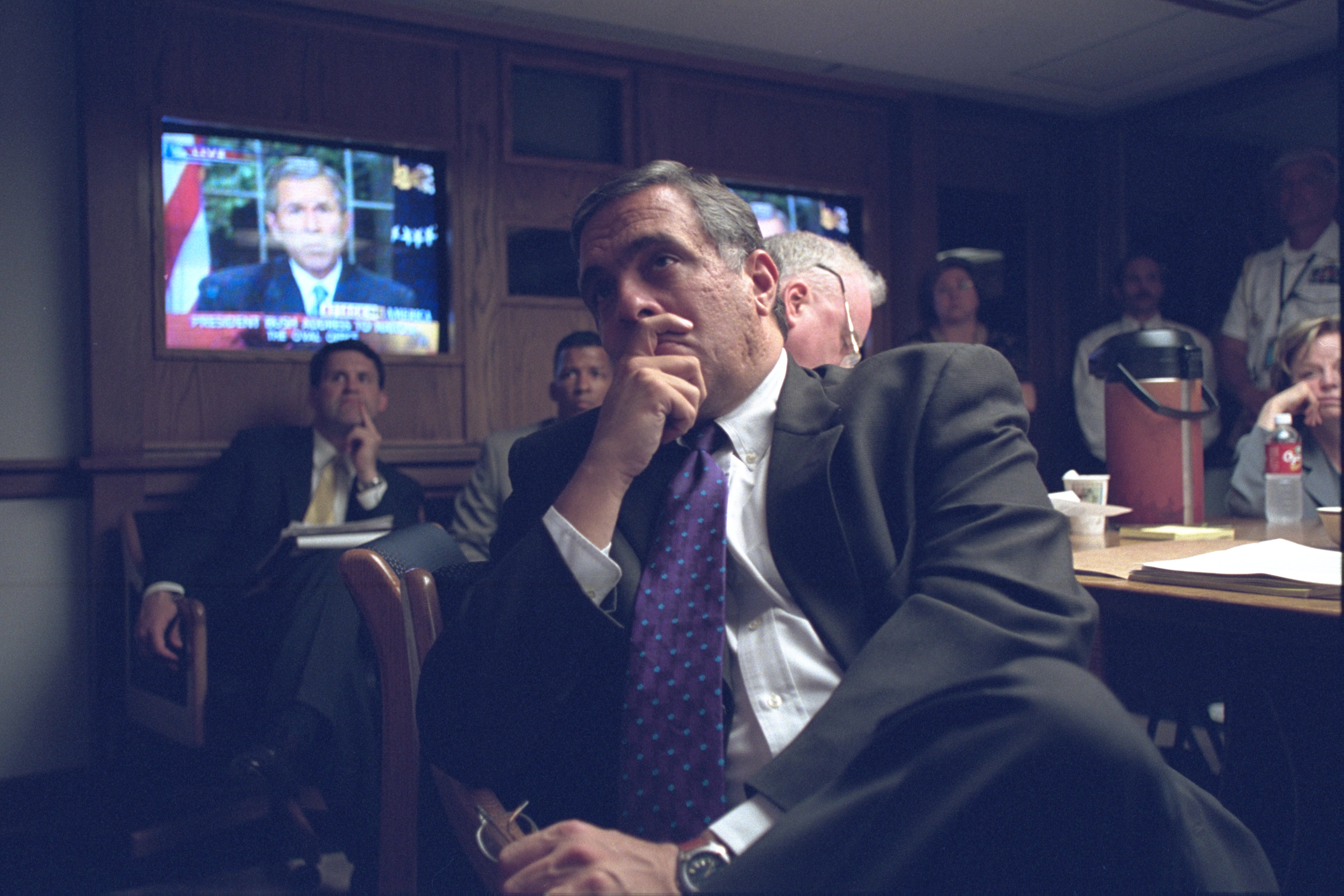
George Tenet on September 11, 2001

After the September 11 attacks, many observers criticized the Intelligence Community for numerous "intelligence failures" as one of the major reasons why the attacks were not prevented.

Tenet testified before a public hearing of the 9/11 Commission investigating 9/11, that he did not meet with Bush in August 2001, the month before the September 11 attacks. The evening after the hearings, a CIA spokesman corrected Tenet's testimony, stating that Tenet did indeed meet with Bush twice in August. Tenet in his memoir writes of his memorable visit to Bush at Bush's ranch in Crawford, Texas, in August 2001.

In August 2007, a report written by the CIA inspector general was made public (it was originally written in 2005 but kept classified). The 19-page summary states that Tenet knew the dangers of al-Qaeda well before September 2001, but that the leadership of the CIA did not do enough to prevent any attacks and that Tenet personally "bears ultimate responsibility" for the intelligence community's failure to develop a plan to counter al-Qaeda. Tenet reacted to the publication of this report by calling it "flat wrong", citing in particular the planning efforts of the prior two years.

Tenet immediately increased the size and capability of the CIA's special operations component housed in the Special Operations Group of the Special Activities Division. This force had been allowed to diminish under the early Clinton administration. These paramilitary officers were the first to enter both Afghanistan and Iraq. Once in these countries these officers organized and led the Northern Alliance against the Taliban in Afghanistan and the Kurds against Ansar Al-Islam and Saddam's forces in Iraq. The rebuilding of this capability and the successful deployment of these elite commandos is considered one of Tenet's greatest achievements in the Global War on Terror. The increased use of paramilitary officers led to fatalities in their ranks. The first of these was Johnny Micheal Spann, a former Marine Corps officer killed during the Battle of Qala-i-Jangi on 25 November 2001. Tenet personally informed CIA staff of Spann's death.

==== Worldwide Attack Matrix ====
Tenet considered his Al-Qaeda plan to have placed the CIA in a better position to respond after the September 11 attacks. As he put it:

How could [an intelligence] community without a strategic plan tell the president of the United States just four days after 9/11 how to attack the Afghan sanctuary and operate against al-Qa'ida in ninety-two countries around the world?

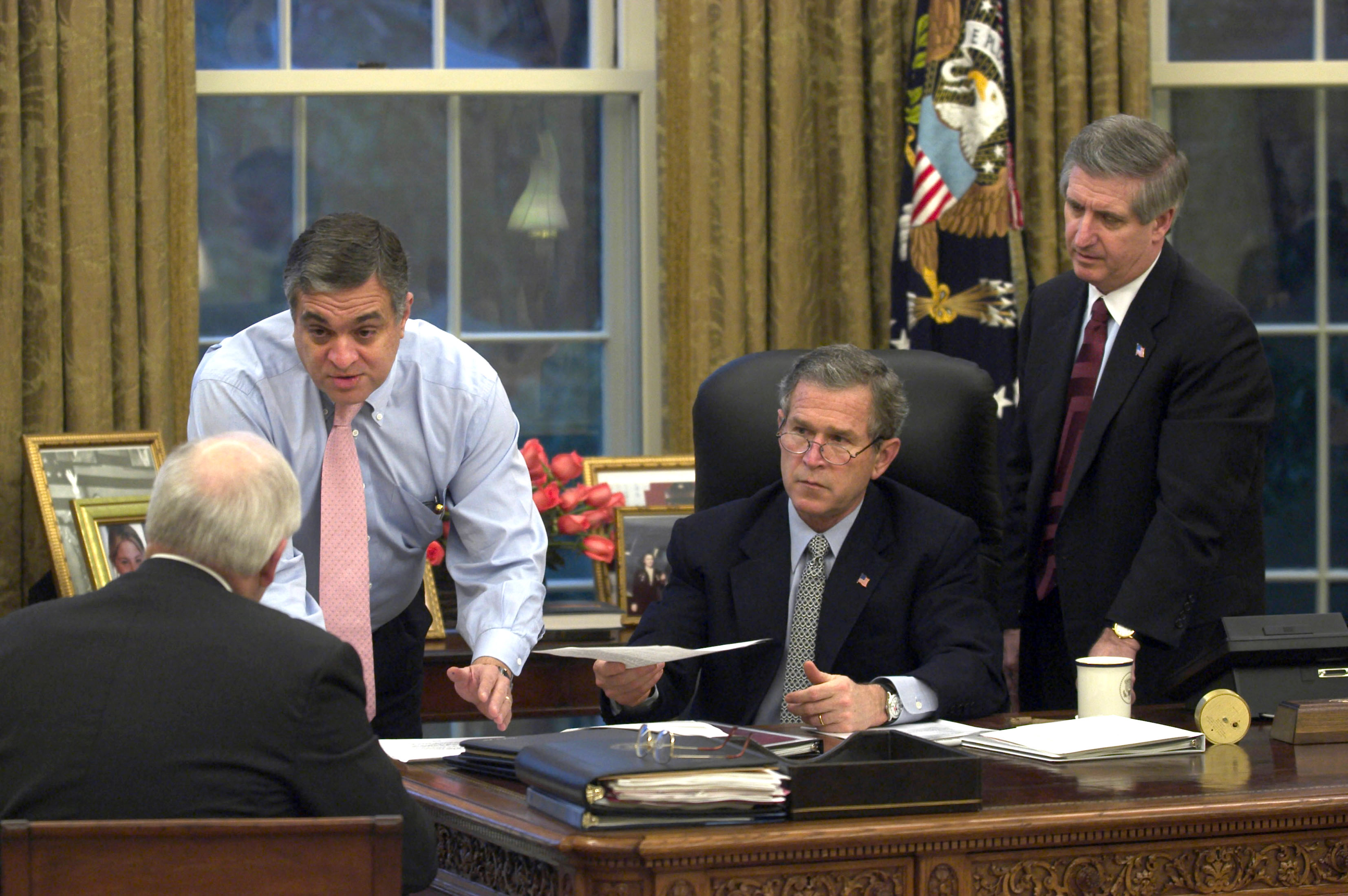
Tenet (left, in pink tie) briefs President George W. Bush in the Oval Office along White House Chief of Staff Andrew Card and Vice President Dick Cheney (with back to camera).

This was at a meeting of the restricted National Security Councilor "war council"—at Camp David on September 15, 2001. Tenet presented the Worldwide Attack Matrix, a blueprint for what became known as the war on terror. He proposed firstly to send CIA teams into Afghanistan to collect intelligence on, and mount covert operations against, al-Qaeda and the Taliban. The teams would act jointly with military Special Operations units. "President Bush later praised this proposal, saying it had been a turning point in his thinking."

==== Waterboarding and enhanced interrogation techniques (EITs) ====
During Tenet's directorship, President Bush authorized the CIA to use waterboarding and other forms of torture (euphemistically referred to as "Enhanced Interrogation Techniques") during interrogations of Khalid Sheikh Mohammed, Abu Zubaydah and Abd al-Rahim al-Nashiri, all suspected Al Qaida members. CIA directors George Tenet, Porter Goss, and Michael Hayden provided inaccurate and misleading information to members of the U.S. Congress, the White House, and the Director of National Intelligence about the program's effectiveness and the number of prisoners that the CIA held.

=== Iraq WMD controversy ===
According to a report by veteran investigative journalist Bob Woodward in his book Plan of Attack, Tenet privately lent his personal authority to the intelligence reports about weapons of mass destruction (WMDs) in Iraq. At a meeting in December 2002, he assured Bush that the evidence that Iraq had WMDs amounted to a "slam dunk case". After several months of refusing to confirm this statement, Tenet stated that it was taken out of context. He indicated that it was made pursuant to a discussion about how to convince the American people to support invading Iraq. The search following the 2003 invasion of Iraq by U.S.-led Coalition forces yielded no significant WMDs.

In September 2002, the Senate Intelligence Committee met with Tenet in a closed-door session. Senator Bob Graham requested a National Intelligence Estimate (NIE) on Iraq. Tenet responded by saying "We've never done a National Intelligence Estimate on Iraq" and resisted the request to provide one to Congress. Graham insisted "This is the most important decision that we as members of Congress and that the people of America are likely to make in the foreseeable future. We want to have the best understanding of what it is we're about to get involved with." Tenet refused to do a report on the military or occupation phase, but reluctantly agreed to do a NIE on the weapons of mass destruction. Graham described the Senate Intelligence Committee meeting with Tenet as "the turning point in our attitude towards Tenet and our understanding of how the intelligence community has become so submissive to the desires of the administration. The administration wasn't using intelligence to inform their judgment; they were using intelligence as part of a public relations campaign to justify their judgment."

Congress voted to support the Iraq war based on the NIE that Tenet provided in October 2002. However, the bipartisan Senate Intelligence Committee Report on Prewar Intelligence released on July 7, 2004, concluded that the key findings in the 2002 NIE either overstated, or were not supported by, the actual intelligence. The Senate report also found the US Intelligence Community to suffer from a "broken corporate culture and poor management" that resulted in a NIE which was wrong in almost every respect.

=== Resignation ===
Citing "personal reasons," Tenet submitted his resignation to President Bush on June 3, 2004. Tenet said his resignation "was a personal decision and had only one basis—in fact, the well-being of my wonderful family—nothing more and nothing less." He officially left on July 11, exactly seven years after being appointed by Clinton. Former DCI Stansfield Turner said, "I think the president feels he's in enough trouble that he's got to begin to cast some of the blame for the morass that we are in in Iraq on to somebody else and this was one subtle way to do it." However, Bush voiced support for Tenet's efforts, stating, "I'm sorry he's leaving. He's done a superb job on behalf of the American people."

James Pavitt, Tenet's Deputy Director for Operations at the CIA, announced his own resignation the following day. That led to speculation that the exit of both senior intelligence officials was related to the controversy over the September 11 attacks, alleged Iraqi WMDs, and the decision to go to war with Iraq. After Tenet left, John E. McLaughlin served as acting director until Porter Goss was sworn to the position on September 24, two days after the Senate approved him. Tenet's seven-year term as Director of Central Intelligence was the second-longest in US history, after Allen Dulles.

Human Rights Watch and The New York Times Editorial board have called for the prosecution of Tenet "for conspiracy to torture as well as other crimes."

== Later life ==
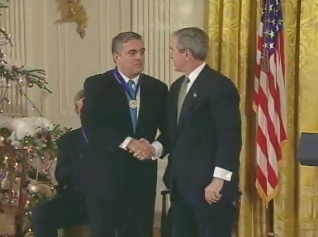
President Bush awarding the Presidential Medal of Freedom to Tenet on December 14, 2004

On December 14, 2004, President George W. Bush awarded Tenet the Presidential Medal of Freedom, along with Tommy Franks and Paul Bremer. Bush said that Tenet "was one of the first to recognize and address the growing threat to America from radical terrorist networks." However, Bush's decision was met with some criticism: Democratic Senator Carl Levin said, "I don't think [he] served the president or the nation well." Democratic Senator John Kerry said through spokesperson David Wade, "My hunch is that George Bush wasn't using the same standard when honoring Tenet and Bremer that was applied to previous honorees."

Tenet spent three years as Distinguished Professor in the Practice of Diplomacy and Senior Research Associate in the Institute for the Study of Diplomacy at his former university, the Georgetown School of Foreign Service. His official teaching began in the Fall term, 2005.

In October 2006, Tenet joined British defense contractor Qinetiq as an independent non-executive director. Chairman John Chisholm noted Tenet's "extraordinary track record and experience in the fields of intelligence and security." He stepped down from the board in October 2007 (his old position was taken by retired U.S. Navy Admiral Edmund Giambastiani) as well as the board of forensic software company Guidance Software in November. He joined Qinetiq's North America board as well as becoming managing director of investment bank Allen & Company. The secretive bank did not announce Tenet's appointment, and it was unknown until it was leaked in February of the following year. Tenet is also on the boards of directors of L-1 Identity Solutions, a biometric identification software manufacturer. Along with a number of other notable Greek Americans, he is a member of the advisory board of The Next Generation Initiative, a foundation aimed at teaching students public affairs skills.

=== Memoir ===
In April 2007, Tenet released his memoir titled At the Center of the Storm: My Years at the CIA which was written with Bill Harlow. He appeared on 60 Minutes on April 29, 2007, offering much criticism of the Bush administration. The book was the top-selling book in sales in the first week after publication.

In his book The One Percent Doctrine, journalist and author Ron Suskind claims that Abu Zubaydah, once said to be al-Qaida chief of operations, was a low-level functionary and mentally ill. In his memoirs, Tenet commented as follows:

A published report in 2006 contended that Abu Zubaydah was mentally unstable and that the administration had overstated his importance. Baloney. Abu Zubaydah had been at the crossroads of many al-Qa'ida operations and was in position to—and did—share critical information with his interrogators. Apparently, the source of the rumor that Abu Zubaydah was unbalanced was his personal diary, in which he adopted various personas. From that shaky perch, some junior Freudians leapt to the conclusion that Zubaydah had multiple personalities. In fact, Agency psychiatrists eventually determined that in his diary he was using a sophisticated literary device to express himself. And, boy, did he express himself.

Critics pointed out a factual error in Tenet's book. On the book's first page, Tenet tells of a conversation with then-Pentagon advisor Richard Perle on September 12, 2001, in which Tenet claims Perle told him in person that "Iraq had to pay for the attack". But the conversation could not have occurred on that day, because Perle was stranded in Paris, France, on September 12 and did not return to Washington until three days later. Perle later stated that the two men indeed crossed each other one morning, as claimed by Tenet, but only later in the same week and not on September 12. But Perle insisted that he and Tenet exchanged no words in that encounter.

== Personal life ==
Tenet is married to A. Stephanie Glakas-Tenet. (Note: She is also referred to without a first initial. Her maiden name is Glakas.) They have one son, John Michael.

== Recognition ==
In 1998, Tenet received the Golden Plate Award of the American Academy of Achievement.

In 2018, Tenet received the Washington Institute's Scholar-Statesman Award.

== See also ==
- Bin Laden Issue Station: The CIA's Osama bin Laden tracking unit, 1996–2003

== General bibliography ==
- 9/11 Commission (2004). 9/11 Commission Report. United States Government Printing Office. ISBN 978-0-393-06041-6.
- Atkins, Stephen E. (2011). "George Tenet (1953–)". The 9/11 Encyclopedia (2nd ed.). Santa Barbara, California: ABC-CLIO. ISBN 978-1-59884-921-9.
- Coll, Steve (2005). Ghost Wars: The Secret History of the CIA, Afghanistan, and Bin Laden, from the Soviet Invasion to September 10, 2001. Penguin Books. ISBN 978-0-14-303466-7.
- Diamond, John M. (2008). The CIA and the Culture of Failure: U.S. Intelligence from the End of the Cold War to the Invasion of Iraq. Stanford University Press. ISBN 978-0-8047-5601-3.
- Friedman, George (2004). America's Secret War: Inside the Hidden Worldwide Struggle Between America and Its Enemies. Doubleday. ISBN 978-0-385-51245-9.
- Kessler, Ronald (2003). The CIA at War: Inside the Secret Campaign Against Terror. St. Martin's Press. ISBN 978-0-312-31932-8.
- Risen, James (2006). State of War: The Secret History of the CIA and the Bush Administration. Free Press. ISBN 978-0-7432-7066-3.
- Suskind, Ron (2006). The One Percent Doctrine: Deep Inside America's Pursuit of Its Enemies Since 9/11. Simon & Schuster. ISBN 978-0-7432-7109-7.
- Tenet, George; Harlow, Bill (2007). At the Center of the Storm: My Years at the CIA. HarperCollins. ISBN 978-0-06-114778-4.
- United States Senate Select Committee on Intelligence (May 6, 1997). Nomination of George J. Tenet to be Director of Central Intelligence (PDF). Washington, D.C.: United States Government Printing Office. ISBN 978-0-16-056075-0.
- Weiner, Tim (2007). Legacy of Ashes: The History of the CIA. Doubleday. ISBN 978-0-385-51445-3.

Government offices
Preceded by Bill Studeman	Deputy Director of Central Intelligence; 1995–1997	Succeeded by John Gordon
Preceded by John Deutch	Director of Central Intelligence; 1996–2004; Acting: 1996–1997	Succeeded by John McLaughlin; Acting
