= Porter Goss =

American politician (born 1938)

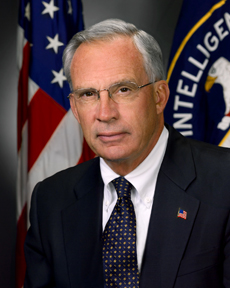

1st Director of the Central Intelligence Agency
- In office April 21, 2005 – May 5, 2006
- President: George W. Bush
- Deputy: Albert Calland
- Preceded by: Himself (Central Intelligence)
- Succeeded by: Michael Hayden

19th Director of Central Intelligence
- In office September 24, 2004 – April 21, 2005
- President: George W. Bush
- Deputy: John E. McLaughlin
- Preceded by: John E. McLaughlin (acting)
- Succeeded by: Himself (Central Intelligence Agency); John Negroponte (National Intelligence)

Chair of the House Intelligence Committee
- In office January 3, 1997 – September 23, 2004
- Preceded by: Larry Combest
- Succeeded by: Pete Hoekstra

Member of the U.S. House of Representatives from Florida
- In office January 3, 1989 – September 23, 2004
- Preceded by: Connie Mack III
- Succeeded by: Connie Mack IV
- Constituency: 13th district (1989–1993); 14th district (1993–2004)

Personal details
- Born: Porter Johnston Goss; November 26, 1938 (age 87) Waterbury, Connecticut, U.S.
- Party: Republican
- Spouse: Mariel Robinson
- Children: 4
- Education: Yale University (BA)
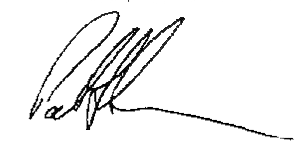
- Signature

Military service
- Branch/service: United States Army
- Years of service: 1960–1962; 1962–1972
- Goss's voice Goss responding to questions on the CIA's interrogations of enemy combatants. Recorded February 16, 2005

Porter Johnston Goss (/ɡɒs/; born November 26, 1938) is an American politician who served as the head of the Central Intelligence Agency from 2004 to 2006. He was the last director of Central Intelligence (DCI) from 2004 to 2005, then became the first director of the Central Intelligence Agency following the passage of the 2004 Intelligence Reform and Terrorism Prevention Act, which abolished the DCI position and replaced it with the Director of National Intelligence on December 17, 2004.

Before taking over the CIA, Goss was a Republican member of the U.S. House of Representatives from Florida's 14th congressional district from 1989 to 2004. His district, numbered as the 13th District from 1989 to 1993, included Fort Myers, Naples and part of Port Charlotte. He served as Chairman of the House Permanent Select Committee on Intelligence from 1997 to 2004, was a co-sponsor of the USA PATRIOT Act and was a co-chair of the Joint 9/11 Intelligence Inquiry.

Goss resigned as Director of the CIA on May 5, 2006, in a sit-down press conference with President George W. Bush from the Oval Office. On May 8, Bush nominated U.S. Air Force General Michael Hayden to be Goss's successor.

== Education and early CIA career ==
Goss was born in Waterbury, Connecticut, the son of Virginia Holland (née Johnston) and Richard Wayne Goss, who was an executive of the Scovill Manufacturing Company (a corporation controlled by the Goss family). He attended Camp Timanous in Raymond, Maine, and was educated at the Fessenden School. In 1956, he graduated from the Hotchkiss School in Lakeville, Connecticut.

Goss graduated from Yale University in 1960 with a Bachelor of Arts in ancient Greek. (Goss also speaks Spanish and French.) At Yale, he was in Timothy Dwight College and he was a member of Book and Snake, a secret society. He was a member of the Psi Upsilon fraternity alongside William H. T. Bush, the uncle of President George W. Bush, and John Negroponte, who served as an ambassador for George H. W. Bush and George W. Bush, and as Goss's superior in the post of Director of National Intelligence from 2005 to 2006. Negroponte solicited Goss's assistance, while Goss was Chairman of the House Intelligence Committee, to get the position as U.S. ambassador to the United Nations in the first term of the second Bush administration.

In his junior year at Yale, Goss was recruited by the Central Intelligence Agency. He spent much of the 1960s—roughly from 1960 until 1971—working for the Directorate of Operations, the clandestine services of the CIA. There he first worked in Latin America and the Caribbean and later in Europe. The full details are not known due to the classified nature of the CIA, but Goss says he has worked in Haiti, Santo Domingo, and Mexico.

Goss, who has said he has recruited and trained foreign agents, worked in Miami for much of the time. Goss was involved in the Cuban Missile Crisis in 1962, telling The Washington Post in 2002 that he had done some "small-boat handling" and had "some very interesting moments in the Florida Straits".

Towards the end of his career as a CIA officer, Goss was transferred to Europe, where, in 1970, he collapsed in his London hotel room because of a blood infection in his heart and kidneys. Fox News reported that Goss believes he was poisoned.

Goss first retired from the CIA in 1971, and moved to Sanibel, Florida.

After his return to CIA service as the presidentially-appointed Director (DCI/DCIA), Goss again retired from the CIA on May 5, 2006.

== Government career ==
After his first retirement from the CIA, Goss moved to Sanibel, a resort town off the coast of Fort Myers. In 1974, he was elected to the City Council and then was elected mayor by the council. In 1983, Bob Graham, then Governor of Florida, appointed Goss to the Lee County Board of Commissioners.

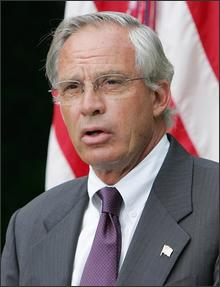
Representative Goss talks to the press.

In 1988 Goss ran for Congress in what was then the 13th congressional district of Florida, which was located on the Gulf Coast and stretched from Sarasota to Naples. The seat was vacated by Connie Mack III when he ran successfully for the U.S. Senate. In the Republican primary—the real contest in this heavily Republican district—Goss's main opponents were former congressman Louis A. "Skip" Bafalis, who had represented much of the area for 10 years before making an unsuccessful bid for governor (the 13th had been carved out of the western portion of Bafalis' territory after the 1980 census) and retired General James L. Dozier.

Bafalis was initially heavily favored due to his name recognition. However, he garnered only 29% of the vote to Goss's 38%, largely due to the fact that Goss's campaign was much better financed. Goss went on to defeat Bafalis handily in the runoff election. In the general election, Goss faced the former first president of Common Cause, Jack T. Conway. Goss won in a rout, taking 71 percent of the vote. He was easily re-elected seven times from this district, which was renumbered as the 14th District after the 1990 census. The district was so heavily Republican that Goss faced a Democrat only one other time, in 1996; he won with 73 percent of the vote. He was unopposed for reelection in 1990, 1994, 1998, and 2002, and faced only third-party opposition in 1992 and 2000.

In Congress, Goss had a mostly conservative voting record. However, he tended to be much more supportive of environmental legislation than most of his fellow Republicans. For instance, he supported the Kyoto Protocol and strengthening the Environmental Protection Agency. Most of his major legislation has been intelligence authorization bills, with some local constituent-services bills.

The legislation he sponsored included a constitutional amendment to establish term limits limiting representatives to no more than three consecutive terms of four years. Major bills sponsored by Goss include a bill to limit congressional pay raises to no more than Social Security cost-of-living adjustments (unpassed), The Public Interest Declassification Act of 1999 (unpassed), and the USA PATRIOT Act.

He served in Congress for 16 years until his appointment by President George W. Bush to be Director of the Central Intelligence Agency (CIA). While in the House, Goss served as chair of the House Intelligence Committee from 1997 until 2005 and the vice-chairman of the House Rules Committee. He also helped establish and served on the Homeland Security Committee. As a congressman, Goss consistently and emphatically defended the CIA and supported strong budget increases for the Agency, even during a time of tight budgets and Clintonian slashes to other parts of the intelligence budgets. In mid-2004, Goss took a very strong position, during what had already been announced as his last congressional term, urging specific reforms and corrections in the way the CIA carried out its activities, lest it become "just another government bureaucracy".

== Career timeline ==
- Ripon Society
- Council on Foreign Relations
- CIA employee 1962–1971
- Mayor Sanibel, FL (1975–1977, 1981–1982)
- U.S. Congressman, Florida 14th (January 3, 1989 to September 23, 2004; numbered as 13th 1989–1993, resigned)
- CIA Director September 22, 2004 to May 5, 2006 (resigned)

=== Intelligence inquiry: September 11, 2001 ===
In August 2001, Goss, Senator Bob Graham (D-FL), and Senator Jon Kyl (R-AZ) visited Islamabad, Pakistan. Meetings were held with President Pervez Musharraf and with Pakistan's military and intelligence officials including the head of Pakistan's Inter Services Intelligence (ISI) General Mahmud Ahmed, as well as with the Afghan ambassador to Pakistan, Abdul Salam Zaeef. On the morning of September 11, 2001, Goss and Graham were having breakfast with General Ahmad. Ahmad's network had ties to Osama bin Laden and directly funded, supported, and trained the Taliban. They met with Musharraf and Zaeef on the 27th. As reported by Agence France Presse on August 28, 2001, Zaeef assured the US delegation that the Taliban would never allow bin Laden to use Afghanistan to launch attacks on the US or any other country. Goss fully defended the CIA and the Bush administration. With the White House and Senator Graham, his counterpart in the Senate Intelligence Committee, Goss rebuffed calls for an inquiry in the weeks immediately following September 11.

After growing pressure, Congress established the Joint Inquiry into Intelligence Community Activities before and after the Terrorist Attacks of September 11, 2001, a joint inquiry of the two intelligence committees, led by Graham and Goss. Goss and Graham made it clear that their goal was not to identify specific wrongdoing: Graham said the inquiry would not play "the blame game about what went wrong from an intelligence perspective", and Goss said, "This is not a who-shall-we-hang type of investigation. It is about where are the gaps in America's defense and what do we do about it type of investigation."

The Washington Post reported statements made by Goss on May 17, 2002. Goss said he was looking for "solutions, not scapegoats". He called the uproar over the President's Daily Brief of August 6, 2001, "a lot of nonsense". He also said, "None of this is news, but it's all part of the finger-pointing. It's foolishness." The Post also reported that Goss refused to blame an "intelligence failure" for September 11, preferring to praise the agency's "fine work". (Washington Post, May 18, 2002, "A Cloak But No Dagger; An Ex-Spy Says He Seeks Solutions, Not Scapegoats for 9/11")

The inquiry's final report was released in December 2002 and focused entirely on the CIA and FBI's activities, leaving out any information on the White House's activities. Ray McGovern, a 27-year veteran of the CIA turned Democratic political activist and a frequent commentator on intelligence issues, believed the report showed that Goss gave "clear priority to providing political protection for the president" when conducting the inquiry.

Goss publicly declared his opposition to the creation of an independent 9-11 Commission. A year later, he declined to open committee hearings into the Plame affair, saying: "Somebody sends me a blue dress and some DNA, I'll have an investigation."

Goss chiefly blames President Bill Clinton for the CIA failures. He confided in a reporter: "The one thing I lose sleep about is thinking what could I have done better, how could I have gotten more attention on this problem sooner." When asked whether he ever brought up his concerns with the administration, Goss claimed he had met three times with President Clinton to discuss "certain problems". The upshot? "He was patient and we had an interesting conversation but it was quite clear he didn't value the intelligence community to the degree President Bush does."

As Newsweek and CNN reported, in June 2004, while Chairman of the House Intelligence Committee, in the face of withering attacks by the Democrats against the Bush administration in a very tightly contested presidential and congressional election year, Goss defended the intelligence community and the Administration in decidedly partisan terms. During floor debate, fending off efforts by the Democrats in the House to cut the intelligence budget, Goss argued that Senator John Kerry (D-Mass.), the Democratic presidential nominee, did not appreciate the critical need for robust and sustained support for the CIA and the Intelligence Community. Goss noted a 1977 quote of Kerry's arguing for intelligence budget cuts and calling Kerry's proposals on nuclear security "dangerously naive".

== CIA Director ==
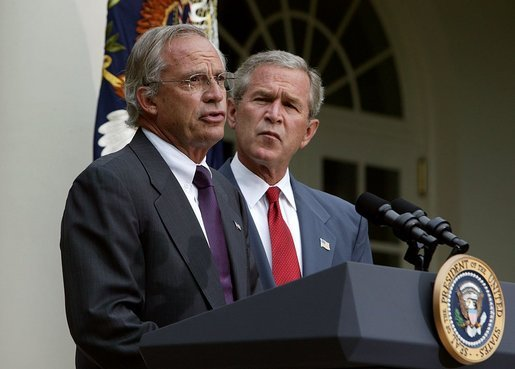
Porter Goss addresses the media after President Bush nominated him to be the director of the CIA.

Following the June 3, 2004, resignation of CIA director George Tenet, Goss was nominated to become the new director on August 10 by President George W. Bush. The appointment was challenged by some prominent Democrats, including former Vice President Al Gore and Senator Robert Byrd (D-WV). Senator John D. Rockefeller IV (D-WV), vice chairman of the Senate Intelligence Committee, expressed concerns that Goss was too politically partisan, given his public remarks against Democrats while serving as chairman of the House Intelligence Committee. Another Democratic member of the committee, Ron Wyden (D-OR), expressed concerns that given Goss's history within and ties to the CIA, he would be too disinclined to push for institutional change. In an interview carried out by Michael Moore's production company on March 3, 2004, Goss described himself as "probably not qualified" for a job within the CIA, because the language skills the Agency now seeks are not languages he speaks and because the people applying today for positions within the CIA's four directorates have such keen technical and analytic skills, which he did not have when he applied to the Agency in the early 1960s (see below).

The U.S. Senate Intelligence Committee endorsed his nomination by a 12–4 vote on September 20, 2004, and on September 22 he was confirmed by the Senate in a 77–17 vote. Republican senators unanimously backed him, along with many prominent Democrats, including the two Democratic senators from Florida, Bob Graham and Bill Nelson, and Senate Minority Leader Tom Daschle.

While at the CIA, Goss reportedly began to reverse the acts of the previous directors. Goss and others noted in numerous reports and writings their opposition to risk aversion "which is the last thing you want in an intelligence agency".

=== Resignation ===
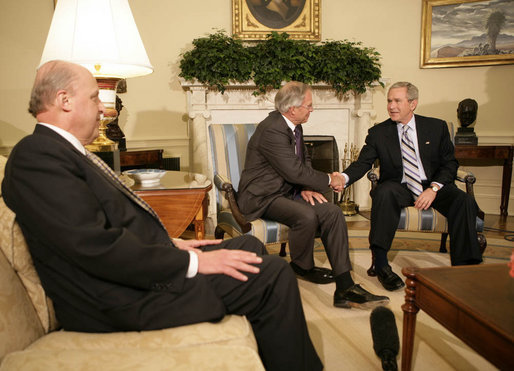
President George W. Bush and Director of National Intelligence John Negroponte (left) accept Goss's resignation in the Oval Office.

On May 5, 2006, Goss's resignation was announced at a joint press briefing with President Bush at the White House. There was speculation in the press concerning the reasons for the sudden announcement. His choice for the position of executive director of the Central Intelligence Agency, Kyle Foggo, was enveloped in an extensive procurement scandal within days of Goss's resignation.

The Los Angeles Times reported: "Goss was pushed out by Negroponte after clashes between them over Goss's management style, as well as his reluctance to surrender CIA personnel and resources to new organizations set up to combat terrorism and weapons proliferation." Negroponte for his part had been an ambassador and a consumer of intelligence. Goss made the point with Negroponte that pursuing changes Negroponte reportedly desired, in the manner upon which Negroponte reportedly insisted, contradicted the intent of the intelligence reform legislation to add to the capabilities of the existing agencies in the intelligence community, not to detract and diminish those existing capabilities. The Weekly Standard also noted that Goss wanted intelligence analysts to get more exposure to intelligence gathering and Negroponte planned to move them from the CIA over to DNI, farther from intelligence gathering. While the editors of The Weekly Standard sided with Goss in this dispute, they believe Goss was forced out for other reasons:

[W]e are concerned that Goss left, or was eased out, for reasons of greater policy significance. And if this is the case, Goss's leaving is not a good sign. Goss is a political conservative and an institutional reformer. He is pro-Bush Doctrine and pro-shaking-up-the-CIA. John Negroponte, so far as we can tell, shares none of these sympathies. Negroponte is, therefore, more in tune with large swaths of the intelligence community and the State Department. If Negroponte forced Goss out and is allowed to pick Goss's successor—if Goss isn't replaced with a reformer committed to fighting and winning the war on terror, broadly and rightly understood—then Goss's departure will prove to have been a weakening moment in an administration increasingly susceptible to moments of weakness.

Goss was replaced by Negroponte's Principal Deputy Director for National Intelligence, four-star Air Force General Michael Hayden.

Excerpt from the History of the Office of the Director of National Intelligence:

The idea of a Director of National Intelligence (DNI) dates to 1955 when a blue-ribbon study commissioned by Congress recommended that the Director of Central Intelligence should employ a deputy to run the CIA so that the director could focus on coordinating the overall intelligence effort.

Robert Novak's May 11 column claimed "Goss faced a disintegrating CIA. The major analytic functions were passed to the DNI. Special operations were going over to the Pentagon. Negroponte was no help to Goss. Although bizarre reasons for Goss's resignation have been floated on the Internet, sources say Negroponte simply suggested his time was up."

== Retirement ==
Goss is an active speaker on the lecture circuit. Goss registered in April 2015 as a lobbyist representing Turkey. He is a member of the ReFormers Caucus of Issue One. He also is an avid organic farmer.

In July 2008, Goss was appointed as co-chairman of the Board of the then-new Office of Congressional Ethics. He would continue to serve in that position until 2015.

On February 16, 2016, Goss expressed his support for former Speaker Dennis Hastert in a letter to Judge Thomas M. Durkin.

In October 2022, Goss joined the Council for Responsible Social Media project launched by Issue One to address the negative mental, civic, and public health impacts of social media in the United States co-chaired by former House Democratic Caucus Leader Dick Gephardt and former Massachusetts Lieutenant Governor Kerry Healey.

U.S. House of Representatives
Preceded by Connie Mack III	Member of the U.S. House of Representatives from Florida's 13th congressional district 1989–1993	Succeeded by Dan Miller
Preceded by Harry Johnston	Member of the U.S. House of Representatives from Florida's 14th congressional district 1993–2004	Succeeded by Connie Mack IV
Preceded by Larry Combest	Chair of the House Intelligence Committee; 1997–2004	Succeeded by Pete Hoekstra
Government offices
Preceded by John McLaughlin; Acting	Director of Central Intelligence; 2004–2005	Succeeded by Himself as Director of the Central Intelligence Agency
Preceded by John McLaughlin; Acting	Director of Central Intelligence; 2004–2005	Succeeded by John Negroponte as Director of National Intelligence
Preceded by Himself as Director of Central Intelligence	Director of the Central Intelligence Agency; 2005–2006	Succeeded by Michael Hayden
U.S. order of precedence (ceremonial)
Preceded by Mike Rogers as Former U.S. Representative	Order of precedence of the United States as Former U.S. Representative	Succeeded by Dave Weldon as Former U.S. Representative
