= Director of the Central Intelligence Agency =

Head of the US federal agency

- Seal of the Central Intelligence Agency

- Flag of the Central Intelligence Agency

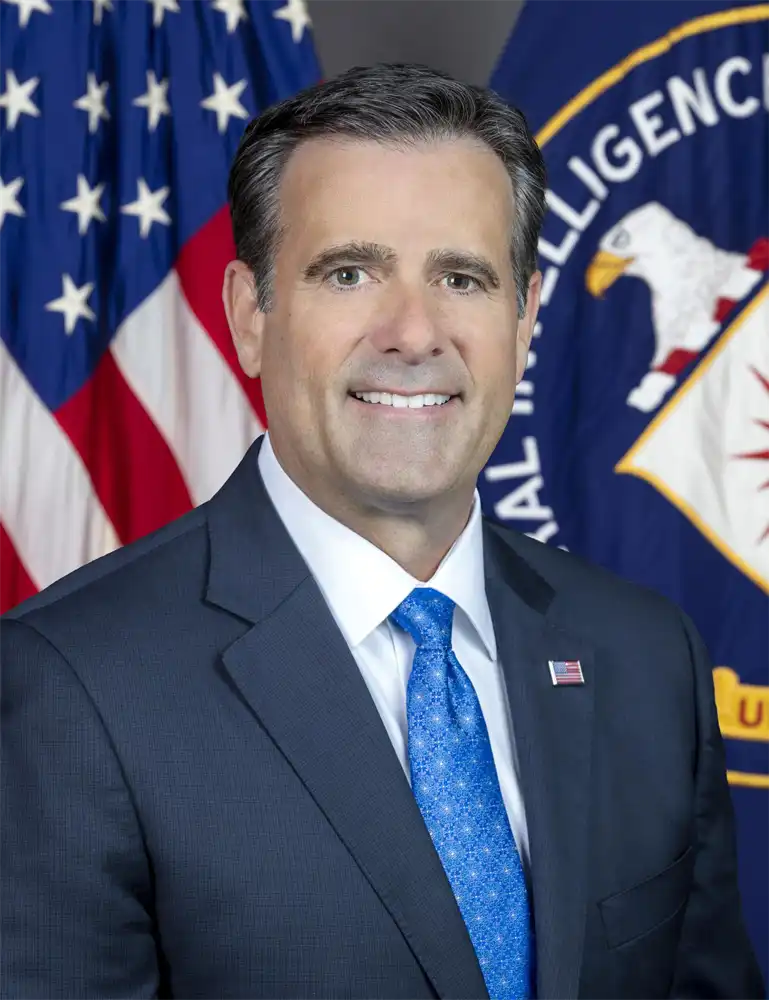
- Incumbent; John Ratcliffe since January 23, 2025
- Central Intelligence Agency
- Abbreviation: D/CIA
- Reports to: Director of National Intelligence (DNI)
- Seat: George Bush Center for Intelligence, Langley, Fairfax County, Virginia
- Appointer: The president; with Senate advice and consent
- Term length: No fixed term
- Constituting instrument: 50 U.S.C. § 3036
- Precursor: Director of Central Intelligence (DCI)
- Formation: December 17, 2004
- First holder: Porter J. Goss
- Deputy: Deputy director
- Salary: $225,700 Executive Schedule, Level II
- Website: www.cia.gov

The director of the Central Intelligence Agency (D/CIA) is a statutory office (50 U.S.C. § 3036) that functions as the head of the Central Intelligence Agency, which in turn is a part of the United States Intelligence Community.

The director reports to the director of national intelligence (DNI) and is assisted by the deputy director of the Central Intelligence Agency (DD/CIA). The director is a civilian or a general or flag officer of the United States Armed Forces nominated by the president of the United States, with the recommendation from the DNI, and must be confirmed by a majority vote of the United States Senate.

== History ==
Before December 17, 2004 the director of central intelligence (DCI) headed both the Intelligence Community and the Central Intelligence Agency. In addition, DCI served as an advisor to the president of the United States on intelligence matters and was the statutory intelligence advisor to the National Security Council.

The post of DCI was established in 1946 by President Harry S. Truman; it thus predates the establishment of the Central Intelligence Agency (created by the National Security Act of 1947). After the end of World War II, the Office of Strategic Services was dismantled. Its functions were split between the departments of state and war. Truman soon recognized the inefficiency of this arrangement and created the Central Intelligence Group, which could be considered a smaller precursor to the National Security Council. The following year the National Security Act of 1947 created the Central Intelligence Agency and National Security Council, while formally defining the duties of the director of Central Intelligence. The duties of the DCI had been further defined over the years by tradition, congressional acts, and Executive Orders.

Beginning in February 2017, the D/CIA was elevated to Cabinet of the United States level status, as designated by the Trump administration. This ended with the beginning of the Biden administration. In July 2023, the D/CIA was once again elevated to Cabinet of the United States level status by the Biden administration.

== Order of succession ==
The order of succession determines which official shall act and perform the functions and duties of the director in the event the director dies, resigns, or otherwise becomes unable to perform their duties. The official will serve as acting director.

If the official is already serving in an acting capacity, or otherwise not eligible under the Federal Vacancies Reform Act of 1998, the order skips to the next person in line. However, the president of the United States retains discretion to depart from the list in designating an acting director.

No.	Title
1	Deputy director
2	Chief operating officer
3	Deputy director of CIA for operations
4	Deputy director of CIA for analysis
5	Deputy director of CIA for science and technology
6	Deputy director of CIA for digital innovation
7	Deputy director of CIA for support
8	General counsel
9	Deputy chief operating officer
10	Senior CIA representative for the United Kingdom
11	Senior CIA representative for the East Coast
12	Senior CIA representative for the West Coast

== List of directors ==
Position succeeded the director of Central Intelligence.

Denotes acting capacity.

No.	Image	Name	Start	End	Duration	President
1		Porter Goss	December 17, 2004	May 5, 2006	1 year, 24 days	George W. Bush (2001–2009)
2		Michael Hayden	May 30, 2006	February 12, 2009	2 years, 260 days	George W. Bush (2001–2009)
3		Leon Panetta	February 13, 2009	June 30, 2011	2 years, 138 days	Barack Obama (2009–2017)
–		Michael Morell; Acting	July 1, 2011	September 6, 2011	68 days	Barack Obama (2009–2017)
4		David Petraeus	September 6, 2011	November 9, 2012	1 year, 66 days	Barack Obama (2009–2017)
–		Michael Morell; Acting	November 9, 2012	March 8, 2013	130 days	Barack Obama (2009–2017)
5		John Brennan	March 8, 2013	January 20, 2017	3 years, 320 days	Barack Obama (2009–2017)
–		Meroe Park; Acting	January 20, 2017	January 23, 2017	3 days	Donald Trump (2017–2021)
6		Mike Pompeo	January 23, 2017	April 26, 2018	1 year, 94 days	Donald Trump (2017–2021)
7		Gina Haspel	April 26, 2018	May 21, 2018	26 days	Donald Trump (2017–2021)
7		Gina Haspel	May 21, 2018	January 20, 2021	2 years, 245 days	Donald Trump (2017–2021)
–		David Cohen; Acting	January 20, 2021	March 19, 2021	59 days	Joe Biden (2021–2025)
8		Bill Burns	March 19, 2021	January 20, 2025	3 years, 308 days	Joe Biden (2021–2025)
–		Tom Sylvester; Acting	January 20, 2025	January 23, 2025	3 days	Donald Trump (2025–present)
9		John Ratcliffe	January 23, 2025	Incumbent	1 year, 297 days	Donald Trump (2025–present)

== See also ==
- Chief, IRS Criminal Investigation
- Director of the Federal Bureau of Investigation
- Director of the United States Marshals Service
- Director of the United States Secret Service
