= List of federal agencies in the United States =

The federal government of the United States includes many agencies, departments, offices and other organizations. The official United States Government Manual and the Administrative Procedure Act list government agencies. The Administrative Procedure Act's definition of agency applies to most executive branch agencies, while the United States Congress may define an agency however it chooses in enabling legislation, and through subsequent litigation often involving the Freedom of Information Act and the Government in the Sunshine Act.

The executive branch of the federal government includes the Executive Office of the President and the United States federal executive departments, whose secretaries belong to the Cabinet of the United States. Employees of the majority of these agencies are considered civil servants.

The majority of the independent agencies of the United States government are also classified as executive agencies. They are independent in that they are not subordinated under a Cabinet position. There is a smaller number of independent agencies that are not part of the executive branch, such as the Congressional Research Service and the United States Sentencing Commission, which are legislative and judicial agencies, respectively.

== United States Congress ==
Seal of the United States Congress.

The U.S. Congress is the bicameral legislature of the United States government, and is made up of two chambers: the United States Senate (the upper chamber) and the United States House of Representatives (the lower chamber). Together, the two chambers exercise authority over multiple legislative agencies.

- Congressional Budget Office (CBO)
- Government Accountability Office (GAO)
- Government Publishing Office (USGPO)
- Office of Congressional Accessibility Services (OCAS)
- Office of the Attending Physician (OAP)
- Office of Congressional Workplace Rights (OCWR)
- Office of Congressional Conduct (OCC)
- Congressional Office for International Leadership
- John C. Stennis Center for Public Service Training and Development
- Capitol Police Board, which governs the United States Capitol Police (USCP)
- Architect of the Capitol (AOC), which is in charge of maintaining the United States Capitol Complex, including the Capitol Visitor Center (CVC) and the United States Botanic Garden (USBG)

The legislature also oversees the Library of Congress (LOC), a national library dedicated to national records, which administers various programs, agencies, and services.

- Law Library of Congress
- Congressional Research Service (CRS)
- United States Copyright Office (USCO) and the Copyright Royalty Board (CRB)
- National Library Service for the Blind and Print Disabled

== Federal judiciary of the United States ==
Seal of the United States Supreme Court.

The federal judiciary consists of courts established under Article Three of the United States Constitution.

- Supreme Court of the United States
- United States Courts of Appeals
- United States District Courts
- United States Judicial Panel on Multidistrict Litigation
- United States Court of International Trade
- United States Foreign Intelligence Surveillance Court
- United States Foreign Intelligence Surveillance Court of Review
- United States Alien Terrorist Removal Court

The Bankruptcy Courts, while not established as Article III courts, are legally designated as "units of the district courts."

- Federal Judicial Center
- Federal Public Defender Organizations
- Judicial Conference of the United States
  - Administrative Office of the United States Courts
    - Department of Administrative Services
    - Department of Program Services
      - United States Probation and Pretrial Services System
    - Department of Technology Services
    - Defender Services Office
    - General Counsel
    - Judicial Conference Executive Secretariat
    - Judicial Integrity Office
    - Legislative Affairs
    - Public Affairs
- Marshal of the United States Supreme Court
  - Supreme Court Police
- United States Sentencing Commission

== Executive Office of the President ==
Seal of the president of the United States.

The president of the United States is the chief executive of the federal government. The president is in charge of executing federal laws and approving, or vetoing, new legislation passed by Congress. The president resides in the Executive Residence (EXR) maintained by the Office of Administration (OA).

To effectively run the country's affairs, the president also maintains councils regarding various issues.

- National Security Council
- National Space Council
- Homeland Security Council (Note: shares staff with the National Security Council)
- Council of Economic Advisers
- Council on Environmental Quality
- President's Intelligence Advisory Board
  - Intelligence Oversight Board
- Executive Residence
- Office of Administration
- Office of Management and Budget
  - Office of Information and Regulatory Affairs (OIRA)
  - Office of Federal Financial Management (OFFM)
  - Office of Federal Procurement Policy (OFPP)
  - Office of E-Government and Information Technology
    - United States DOGE Service
- Office of the Intellectual Property Enforcement Coordinator (IPEC)
- Office of Pandemic Preparedness and Response Policy
- Office of National Drug Control Policy
- Office of the National Cyber Director
- Office of Science and Technology Policy
- Office of the United States Trade Representative
- Office of the Vice President of the United States
- White House Office
  - Office of the Chief of Staff
  - Office of the National Security Advisor
  - Domestic Policy Council
  - National Economic Council
  - Office of Cabinet Affairs
  - Office of Communications
  - Office of Digital Strategy
  - Office of the First Lady
  - Office of Intergovernmental Affairs
  - Office of Legislative Affairs
  - Office of Management and Administration
  - Office of Political Affairs
  - Office of the Staff Secretary
  - Office of Records Management
  - Office of Presidential Advance
  - Presidential Personnel Office
  - Office of Public Engagement
  - Office of the Social Secretary
  - White House Press Secretary
  - Office of White House Counsel
  - Oval Office Operations
  - White House Military Office
  - President's Commission on White House Fellowships

== United States Department of Agriculture (USDA) ==
Seals of the United States Department of Agriculture.

=== Office of the Secretary of Agriculture ===
- Office of Secretary of Agriculture
- Office of Deputy Secretary of Agriculture
- Office of the Assistant Secretary for Administration
- Office of the Assistant Secretary for Civil Rights
- Office of the Assistant Secretary for Congressional Relations
  - Office of External and Intergovernmental Affairs
- Office of the General Counsel (OGC)
  - Office of Information Affairs
- Office of Inspector General (OIG)
- Office of Budget and Program Analysis (OBPA)
- Office of Communications (OC)
- Office of Ethics (OE)
- Office of Hearings and Appeals (OHA)
  - National Appeals Division (NAD)
  - Office of Administrative Law Judges (OALJ)
  - Office of the Judicial Officer (OJO)
- Office of Partnerships and Public Engagement (OPPE)
- Office of the Chief Economist (OCE)
  - World Agricultural Outlook Board
- Office of the Chief Financial Officer (OFCO)
  - National Finance Center (NFC)
- Office of the Chief Information Officer (OCIO)
- Office of the Executive Secretariat (OES)
- Office of Tribal Relations (OTR)
- White House Liaison Office (WHLO)
- Departmental Administration (DA)
  - Office of Customer Experience
  - Office of Contracting and Procurement (OCP)
  - Office of Homeland Security (OHS)
  - Office of Human Resources Management (OHRM)
  - Office of Operations (OO)
  - Office of Property and Environmental Management (OPEM)
    - Agriculture Buildings and Facilities (AgBF)
    - Hazardous Materials Management (HMM)
  - Office of Safety, Security and Protection (OSSP)
  - Office of Small and Disadvantaged Business Utilization (OSDBU)

=== Mission areas ===
==== Farm Production and Conservation (FPAC) ====
- Office of Under Secretary of Agriculture for Farm Production and Conservation
  - Farm Production and Conservation Business Center (FBC)
  - Farm Service Agency (FSA)
    - Commodity Credit Corporation (CCC)
  - Natural Resources Conservation Service (NRCS)
    - Environmental Quality Incentives Program
  - Risk Management Agency (RMA)
    - Federal Crop Insurance Corporation (FCIC)

==== Food, Nutrition, and Consumer Services (FNCS) ====
- Office of Under Secretary of Agriculture for Food, Nutrition, and Consumer Services
  - Food and Nutrition Service (FNS)
    - Center for Nutrition Policy and Promotion (CNPP)

==== Food Safety (OFS) ====
- Office of Under Secretary of Agriculture for Food Safety
  - Food Safety and Inspection Service

==== Marketing and Regulatory Programs (MRP) ====
- Office of Under Secretary of Agriculture for Marketing and Regulatory Programs
  - Agricultural Marketing Service (AMS)
    - Federal Grain Inspection Service (FGIS)
  - Animal and Plant Health Inspection Service (APHIS)
    - Plant Protection and Quarantine (PPQ)
    - Wildlife Services (WS)
    - Animal Care (AC)
    - Veterinary Services (VS)
    - Biotechnology Regulatory Services (BRS)
    - International Services (IS)

==== Natural Resources and Environment (NRE) ====
- Office of Under Secretary of Agriculture for Natural Resources and Environment
  - United States Forest Service (USFS)
    - International Institute of Tropical Forestry
    - Forest Products Laboratory
    - Law Enforcement & Investigations

==== Research, Education, and Economics (REE) ====
- Office of Under Secretary of Agriculture for Research, Education, and Economics
  - Agricultural Research Service (ARS)
    - National Agricultural Library (NAL)
  - Economic Research Service (ERS)
  - National Agricultural Statistics Service (NASS)
  - National Institute of Food and Agriculture (NIFA)
  - Office of the Chief Scientist

==== Rural Development (RD) ====
- Office of Under Secretary of Agriculture for Rural Development
  - Rural Development
    - Rural Business-Cooperative Service (RBCS)
    - Rural Housing Service (RHS)
    - Rural Utilities Service (RUS)

==== Trade and Foreign Agricultural Affairs (TFAA) ====
- Office of Under Secretary of Agriculture for Trade and Foreign Agricultural Affairs
  - Foreign Agricultural Service (FAS)
  - U.S. Codex Office

== United States Department of Commerce ==
Seal of the United States Department of Commerce.

=== Office of the Secretary (OS) ===
- Office of the Secretary of Commerce
- Office of the Chief of Staff
- Office of the Deputy Secretary
- Office of Public Engagement (OPE)
- Office of the Chief Financial Officer and Assistant Secretary for Administration (CFO/ASA)
- Office of Chief Information Officer (OCIO)
- Office of Executive Secretariat
- Office of General Counsel (OGC)
- Office of Legislative and Intergovernmental Affairs (OLIA)
- Office of Native Affairs and Economic Development
- Office of Policy and Strategic Planning (OPSP)
- Office of Public Affairs (OPA)
- Office of Public Engagement (OPE)
- Office of Security (OSY)
- Office of Small and Disadvantaged Business Utilization (OSDBU)
- Office of the White House Liaison (OWHL)
- Office of Inspector General (OIG)

=== Bureaus ===
- Economic Development Administration (EDA)
- Minority Business Development Agency (MBDA)
- National Technical Information Service (NTIS)
- National Telecommunications and Information Administration (NTIA)
  - Institute for Telecommunication Sciences (ITS)
  - First Responder Network Authority (FirstNet)
- Bureau of Industry and Security (BIS)
  - Office of Under Secretary of Commerce for Industry and Security
    - Office of Deputy Under Secretary of Commerce for Industry and Security
    - Office of the Assistant Secretary for Export Administration
      - Office of Strategic Industries and Economic Security
      - Office of Nonproliferation and Treaty Compliance
      - Office of National Security and Technology Transfer Controls
      - Office of Exporter Services
      - Office of Technology Evaluation
    - Office of Assistant Secretary for Export Enforcement
      - Office of Antiboycott Compliance
      - Office of Enforcement Analysis
      - Office of Export Enforcement (OEE)
- Office of Under Secretary of Commerce for Economic Affairs (OUS/EA)
  - Bureau of Economic Analysis (BEA)
  - United States Census Bureau
- United States Patent and Trademark Office (USPTO)
  - Office of the Under Secretary of Commerce for Intellectual Property and Director
    - Office of the Chief Administrative Officer
    - Office of the Chief Communications Officer
    - Office of the Chief Financial Officer
    - Office of the Chief Information Officer
    - Office of the Commissioner for Patents
    - Office of the Commissioner for Trademarks
    - Office of Equal Employment Opportunity
    - Office of the General Counsel
    - Office of Policy and International Affairs
    - Office of Public Engagement
    - Patent Trial and Appeal Board
    - Trademark Trial and Appeal Board
- International Trade Administration (ITA)
  - Office of Under Secretary for International Trade
    - Enforcement and Compliance
    - Industry and Analysis
    - U.S. and Foreign Commercial Service (CS)
    - Office of Legislative and Intergovernmental Affairs
    - Office of Public Affairs
    - Office of the Trade Promotion Coordinating Committee Secretariat
- National Oceanic and Atmospheric Administration (NOAA)
  - Office of the Under Secretary of Commerce for Oceans and Atmosphere
    - NOAA Headquarters Organization
    - National Marine Fisheries Service (NMFS)
      - NOAA Fisheries Office of Law Enforcement
    - National Ocean Service (NOS)
      - National Geodetic Survey (NGS)
    - National Environmental Satellite, Data, and Information Service (NESDIS)
    - Office of Oceanic and Atmospheric Research (OAR)
    - National Weather Service (NWS)
      - National Centers for Environmental Prediction (NCEP)
        - Aviation Weather Center
        - Climate Prediction Center
        - Environmental Modeling Center
        - National Hurricane Center
        - NCEP Central Operations
        - Ocean Prediction Center
        - Space Weather Prediction Center
        - Storm Prediction Center
        - Weather Prediction Center
    - Office of Marine & Aviation Operations (OMOA) and NOAA Corps
- National Institute of Standards and Technology (NIST)
  - Office of the Under Secretary of Commerce for Standards and Technology
    - Chief of Staff
    - CHIPS for America Program Office
    - Innovation and Industry Services
    - Laboratory programs
    - Management resources
    - Staff offices

== United States Department of War (DoW) ==
Seal of the United States Department of Defense.

== United States Department of Education ==
Seal of the United States Department of Education.

=== Office of the Secretary of Education (OSE) ===
- Office of Communications and Outreach
- Office of Finance and Operations
- Office of Inspector General
- Office of the General Counsel
- Office of Legislation and Congressional Affairs
- Office for Civil Rights
- Office of Educational Technology
- Office of the Chief Information Officer
- Office of Planning, Evaluation and Policy Development
- Budget Service
- Risk Management Service

=== Office of Deputy Secretary of Education (ODSE) ===
- Office of Elementary and Secondary Education
  - Office of Migrant Education
  - Office of Safe and Healthy Students
- Office of English Language Acquisition, Language Enhancement, and Academic Achievement for Limited English Language Proficient Students
- Office of Special Education and Rehabilitative Services
  - Office of Special Education Programs
  - Rehabilitation Services Administration

=== Institute of Education Sciences (IES) ===
- National Center for Education Evaluation and Regional Assistance
- National Center for Education Research
- National Center for Education Statistics
- National Center for Special Education Research
- National Board for Education Sciences

=== Office of the Under Secretary (OUS) ===
- Office of Career, Technical, and Adult Education
- Office of Federal Student Aid
- Office of Postsecondary Education

=== White House initiatives and operating commissions ===
- Center for Faith and Opportunity Initiatives
- White House Initiative on Asian Americans and Pacific Islanders
- White House Initiative on Educational Excellence for Hispanics
- White House Initiative on Historically Black Colleges and Universities
- White House Initiative on Educational Excellence for African Americans
- White House Initiative on American Indian and Alaskan Native Education
- Commission on Presidential Scholars
- National Committee on Foreign Medical Education and Accreditation

=== Advisory bodies ===
- Historically Black College and Universities Capital Financing Advisory Board
- National Advisory Committee on Institutional Quality and Integrity
- National Advisory Council on Indian Education
- National Board of the Fund for the Improvement of Postsecondary Education

=== Federally-aided corporations ===
- American Printing House for the Blind
- Gallaudet University
- Howard University
- National Technical Institute for the Deaf

== United States Department of Energy ==
Seal of the United States Department of Energy.

- Leadership offices
  - Office of the Secretary
  - Office of the Deputy Secretary
  - Office of the Under Secretary for Infrastructure
  - Office of the Under Secretary for Science and Innovation
  - Office of the Under Secretary for Nuclear Security and Administrator of the National Nuclear Security Administration
- Program offices
  - Advanced Research Projects Agency-Energy (ARPA-E)
  - Artificial Intelligence and Technology Office (AITO)
  - Loan Programs Office
  - Office of Cybersecurity, Energy Security, and Emergency Response
  - Office of Electricity
  - Office of Energy Efficiency and Renewable Energy
  - Office of Environmental Management
  - Office of Fossil Energy and Carbon Management
  - Office of Indian Energy Policy and Programs
  - Office of Legacy Management
  - Office of Nuclear Energy
  - Office of Science
- Staff offices
  - Office of Congressional and Intergovernmental Affairs
  - Office of Economic Impact and Diversity
  - Office of Enterprise Assessments
  - Office of Environment, Health, Safety, and Security
  - Office of Hearings and Appeals
  - Office of Inspector General
  - Office of Intelligence and Counterintelligence
  - Office of International Affairs
  - Office of Management
  - Office of Policy
  - Office of Project Management
  - Office of Public Affairs
  - Office of Small and Disadvantaged Business Utilization
  - Office of Technology Transitions
  - Office of the Chief Financial Officer
  - Office of the Chief Human Capital Officer
  - Office of the Chief Information Officer
  - Office of the General Counsel
    - Office of NEPA Policy and Compliance
- Power administrations and other agencies
  - Federal Energy Regulatory Commission
  - National Nuclear Security Administration
  - Energy Information Administration
  - Bonneville Power Administration
  - Southeastern Power Administration
  - Southwestern Power Administration
  - Western Area Power Administration
- National Laboratories & Technology Centers
  - Ames Laboratory
  - Argonne National Laboratory
  - Brookhaven National Laboratory
  - Fermi National Accelerator Laboratory
  - Idaho National Laboratory
  - Lawrence Berkeley National Laboratory
  - Lawrence Livermore National Laboratory
  - Los Alamos National Laboratory
  - National Energy Technology Laboratory
  - National Renewable Energy Laboratory
  - New Brunswick Laboratory
  - Oak Ridge Institute for Science and Education
  - Oak Ridge National Laboratory
  - Pacific Northwest National Laboratory
  - Princeton Plasma Physics Laboratory
  - Radiological and Environmental Sciences Laboratory
  - Sandia National Laboratories
  - Savannah River Ecology Laboratory
  - Savannah River National Laboratory
  - SLAC National Accelerator Laboratory
  - Thomas Jefferson National Accelerator Facility
- Field sites
  - Carlsbad Field Office
  - Environmental Management Los Alamos Field Office
  - Golden Field Office
  - Idaho Operations Office
  - Oak Ridge Office of Environmental Management
  - Office of River Protection
  - Portsmouth/Paducah Project Office
  - Richland Operations Office
  - Savannah River Operations Office
  - Office of Science Field Offices
    - Pacific Northwest Site Office

== United States Department of Health and Human Services ==
Seal of the United States Department of Health and Human Services.

- Office of the Secretary (OS)
  - Immediate Office of the Secretary (IOS)
  - Office of the Assistant Secretary for Administration
    - Program Support Center
  - Office of the Assistant Secretary for Financial Resources
  - Office of the Assistant Secretary for Legislation
  - Office of the Assistant Secretary for Planning and Evaluation
  - Office of the Assistant Secretary for Public Affairs
  - Office of the Assistant Secretary for Health
    - National Vaccine Program Office
    - Office of Adolescent Health
    - Office of Disease Prevention and Health Promotion
    - Office of HIV/AIDS and Infectious Disease Policy
    - Office for Human Research Protections
    - Office of Minority Health
    - Office of Population Affairs
    - Office of Research Integrity
    - Office of the Surgeon General
      - Public Health Service Commissioned Corps
    - Office on Women's Health
    - President's Council on Sports, Fitness, and Nutrition
  - Departmental Appeals Board
  - Office for Civil Rights
  - Office of Global Affairs
  - Office of Inspector General
  - Office of Intergovernmental and External Affairs
  - Office of Medicare Hearings and Appeals
  - Office of the General Counsel
  - Office of the Assistant Secretary for Technology Policy and Office of the National Coordinator for Health Information Technology
- Administration on Aging
- Administration for Children and Families
  - Administration for Native Americans
  - Administration on Developmental Disabilities
  - Office of Child Care
  - Office of Child Support Enforcement
  - Children's Bureau
    - National Center on Child Abuse and Neglect
  - Family and Youth Services Bureau
  - Office of Head Start
  - Office of Community Services
  - Office of Family Assistance
  - Office of Refugee Resettlement
  - President's Committee for People with Intellectual Disabilities
- Agency for Healthcare Research and Quality
- Centers for Disease Control and Prevention (CDC)
  - Center for Surveillance, Epidemiology and Laboratory Services (CSELS)
    - Division of Health Informatics and Surveillance
    - Division of Laboratory Systems
    - Division of Public Health Information Dissemination
    - Division of Scientific Education and Professional Development
  - CDC Washington Office
  - Center for Global Health
  - National Institute for Occupational Safety and Health
  - Advisory Committee on Immunization Practices
  - National Center for Health Statistics
- National Vital Statistics System
  - Office for State, Tribal, Local and Territorial Support
  - Office of Equal Employment Opportunity
  - Office of Infectious Diseases
  - National Center for Emerging and Zoonotic Infectious Diseases
    - Division of High-Consequence Pathogens and Pathology (DHCPP)
      - Viral Special Pathogens Branch (VSPB)
  - National Center for HIV/AIDS, Viral Hepatitis, STD, and TB Prevention
  - National Center for Immunization and Respiratory Diseases
  - Office of Minority Health and Health Equity
  - Office of Noncommunicable Diseases, Injury and Environmental Health
  - National Center for Chronic Disease Prevention and Health Promotion
  - National Center for Environmental Health/Agency for Toxic Substances and Disease Registry
  - National Center for Injury Prevention and Control
  - National Center on Birth Defects and Developmental Disabilities
  - Office of Public Health Preparedness and Response
    - Division of Emergency Operations
      - Emergency Operations Center (EOC)
  - Office of Public Health Science Services
    - Center for Surveillance, Epidemiology and Laboratory Services
    - National Center for Health Statistics
  - Office of the Associate Director for Communication
  - Office of the Associate Director for Policy
  - Office of the Associate Director for Science
  - Office of the Chief of Staff
  - Office of the Chief Operating Officer
  - National Institute for Occupational Safety and Health
  - Epidemic Intelligence Service
    - National Center for Health Statistics
- Centers for Medicare and Medicaid Services
- Food and Drug Administration (FDA)
  - National Center for Food Safety and Applied Nutrition
  - Office of Criminal Investigations
- Health Resources and Services Administration
- Patient Affordable Healthcare Act Program
- Indian Health Service
- National Institutes of Health (NIH)
  - National Institutes of Health Police
  - National Cancer Institute
  - National Eye Institute
  - National Heart, Lung, and Blood Institute
  - Rocky Mountain Laboratories
  - National Human Genome Research Institute
  - National Institute on Aging
  - National Institute on Alcohol Abuse and Alcoholism
  - National Institute of Allergy and Infectious Diseases
  - National Institute of Arthritis and Musculoskeletal and Skin Diseases
  - National Institute of Biomedical Imaging and Bioengineering
  - National Institute of Child Health and Human Development
  - National Institute on Deafness and Other Communication Disorders
  - National Institute of Dental and Craniofacial Research
  - National Institute of Diabetes and Digestive and Kidney Diseases
  - National Institute on Drug Abuse
  - National Institute of Environmental Health Sciences
  - National Institute of General Medical Sciences
  - National Institute of Mental Health
  - National Institute on Minority Health and Health Disparities
  - National Institute of Neurological Disorders and Stroke
  - National Institute of Nursing Research
  - Center for Information Technology
  - Center for Scientific Review
  - Fogarty International Center
  - National Center for Advancing Translational Sciences
  - National Center for Complementary and Integrative Health
  - NIH Clinical Center
- Public Health Service
  - Federal Occupational Health
  - Office of the Surgeon General
  - United States Public Health Service Commissioned Corps
- Substance Abuse and Mental Health Services Administration

== United States Department of Homeland Security ==
Seal of the United States Department of Homeland Security.

- Office of the Secretary
  - Office of the Secretary
    - Immediate Office of the Secretary
    - Office of the Deputy Secretary
    - Office of the Chief of Staff
    - Military Advisor's Office
    - Office of the Executive Secretary
    - Joint Requirements Council
  - Office of Strategy, Policy, and Plans
    - Office of Immigration Statistics
    - Office of International Affairs
  - Office of General Counsel
  - Office of Legislative Affairs
  - Office of Public Affairs
  - Office of Partnership and Engagement
    - Homeland Security Advisory Council
    - Office of State and Local Law Enforcement
    - Private Sector Office
  - Office for Civil Rights and Civil Liberties
  - Office of the Citizenship and Immigration Services Ombudsman
  - Office of the Immigration Detention Ombudsman
  - Privacy Office

=== Headquarters offices and directorates ===
- Management Directorate
  - Federal Protective Service
  - Office of Biometric Identity Management
  - Office of the Chief Financial Officer
  - Office of the Chief Information Officer
  - Office of the Chief Human Capital Officer
  - Office of the Chief Procurement Officer
  - Office of the Chief Readiness Support Officer
    - Canine and Equine Governance Board
  - Office of the Chief Security Officer
- Science and Technology Directorate
- Office of Intelligence and Analysis
  - Current and Emerging Threats Center
  - Homeland Identities, Targeting and Exploitation Center
  - Transnational Organized Crime Mission Center
  - Counterterrorism Mission Center
  - Counterintelligence Mission Center
  - Cyber Mission Center
  - Economic Security Mission Center
- Office of Operations Coordination
  - National Operations Center
- Countering Weapons of Mass Destruction Office
  - Chief Medical Officer
- Office of Inspector General

=== Component agencies ===
- Federal Emergency Management Agency (FEMA)
  - United States Fire Administration
  - National Flood Insurance Program
  - Center for Domestic Preparedness
  - Emergency Management Institute
  - Mount Weather Emergency Operations Center
  - Federal Insurance and Mitigation Administration
- Cybersecurity and Infrastructure Security Agency
  - Cybersecurity Division
    - National Cybersecurity and Communications Integration Center
  - National Council of Statewide Interoperability Coordinators (NCSWIC)
  - Infrastructure Security Division
  - Emergency Communications Division
  - National Risk Management Center
  - Integrated Operations Division
  - Stakeholder Engagement Division
  - National Emergency Technology Guard (inactive, but can be activated by the director of CISA)
- Federal Law Enforcement Training Centers
- Transportation Security Administration
  - Federal Air Marshal Service
- United States Citizenship and Immigration Services
- United States Coast Guard
  - Coast Guard Intelligence
  - Coast Guard Investigative Service
  - United States Coast Guard Police
  - United States Coast Guard Yard
  - United States Coast Guard Research and Development Center
  - United States Coast Guard Academy
  - United States Coast Guard Training Center Cape May
  - United States Coast Guard Reserve
  - United States Coast Guard Auxiliary
  - National Ice Center
- United States Customs and Border Protection
  - Air and Marine Operations
  - United States Border Patrol
  - Office of Field Operations
  - Office of Trade
- United States Immigration and Customs Enforcement (ICE)
  - Enforcement and Removal Operations
  - Homeland Security Investigations
  - Office of Professional Responsibility
  - Office of the Principal Legal Advisor
- United States Secret Service
  - United States Secret Service Uniformed Division
  - James J. Rowley Training Center

== United States Department of Housing and Urban Development ==
United States Department of Housing and Urban Development.

=== Executive offices ===
- Office of the Secretary
  - Office of the Deputy Secretary
  - Office of Hearings and Appeals
  - Office of Small and Disadvantaged Business Utilization
  - Office of Faith-Based and Neighborhood Partnerships
- Office of Congressional and Intergovernmental Relations
- Office of Public Affairs

=== Administrative offices ===
- Office of Departmental Equal Employment Opportunity
- Office of General Counsel
  - Departmental Enforcement Center
- Office of the Assistant Secretary for Administration
  - Chief Administrative Office
  - Office of the Chief Human Capital Officer
  - Office of the Chief Procurement Officer
- Office of the Chief Financial Officer
- Office of the Chief Information Officer
- Office of Inspector General

=== Agencies ===
- Government National Mortgage Association (Ginnie Mae)
- Office of Community Planning and Development (CPD)
  - Office of Economic Development (OED)
- Office of Fair Housing and Equal Opportunity (FHEO)
  - Fair Housing Assistance Program
  - Fair Housing Initiatives Program
  - National Fair Housing Training Academy
- Office of Field Policy and Management (FPM)
- Office of Housing
  - Office of Finance and Budget
  - Office of Healthcare Programs
  - Office of Housing Counseling
  - Office of Manufactured Housing Programs
  - Office of Multifamily Housing Programs
  - Office of Operations
  - Office of Risk Management and Regulatory Affairs
  - Office of Single Family Housing
- Office of Lead Hazard Control and Healthy Homes (OLHCHH)
- Office of Policy Development and Research (PD&R)
- Office of Public and Indian Housing (PIH)
  - Real Estate Assessment Center

== United States Department of the Interior (DOI) ==
Seal of the United States Department of the Interior.

- Office of the Secretary
  - Office of Congressional and Legislative Affairs
  - Office of the Executive Secretariat and Regulatory Affairs
  - Office of Intergovernmental and External Affairs
  - Secretary's Indian Water Rights Office
  - Indian Arts and Crafts Board
  - Strategic Sciences Group
  - Interior Museum
  - Land Buy-Back Program for Tribal Nations
  - Office of the Assistant Secretary for Indian Affairs
  - Office of the Assistant Secretary for Fish and Wildlife and Parks
  - Office of the Assistant Secretary for Land and Minerals Management
  - Office of the Assistant Secretary for Water and Science
  - Office of the Assistant Secretary for Policy, Management and Budget
    - Office of Environmental Policy and Compliance
    - Office of Restoration and Damage Assessment
    - Office of Native Hawaiian Relations
    - Office of Policy Analysis
    - Office of Planning and Performance Management
    - Orphaned Wells Program Office
    - National Invasive Species Council
    - Office of Budget
    - Office of Grants Management
    - Office of Acquisition and Property Management
    - Office of Financial Management
    - Office of Small and Disadvantaged Business Utilization
    - Business Integration Office
    - Office of Human Capital
    - Office of Occupational Safety and Health
    - Office of Employee Development
    - Office of Hearings and Appeals
      - Interior Board of Land Appeals
      - Interior Board of Indian Appeals
    - Office of Collaborative Action and Dispute Resolution
    - Appraisal and Valuation Services Office
    - Office of Facilities and Administrative Services
    - Interior Business Center
    - Office of Law Enforcement and Security
    - Office of Wildland Fire
    - Office of Aviation Services
    - Office of Emergency Management
    - Interagency Borderland Coordination and Field Communications Program
    - Office of Natural Resources Revenue
    - Office of Diversity, Inclusion and Civil Rights
    - Office of the Chief Information Officer
- Office of Inspector General
- Office of the Solicitor
- Office of the Assistant Secretary for Insular and International Affairs
- Central Utah Project Completion Act Office
- Bureau of Indian Affairs
- Bureau of Indian Education
- Bureau of Land Management
- Bureau of Ocean Energy Management
- Bureau of Reclamation
- Bureau of Safety and Environmental Enforcement
- Bureau of Trust Funds Administration
- Office of Surface Mining Reclamation and Enforcement
- National Indian Gaming Commission
- National Park Service (NPS)
- United States Fish and Wildlife Service
- United States Geological Survey

== United States Department of Justice (DOJ) ==
Seal of the United States Department of Justice.

- Office of the Attorney General
- Office of the Deputy Attorney General
- Office of the Associate Attorney General
- Office of the Solicitor General
- Special Counsel's Office
- Antitrust Division
- Civil Division
- Civil Rights Division
- Criminal Division
- Environment and Natural Resources Division
- Justice Management Division
  - Asset Forfeiture Fund
- National Security Division
- Tax Division
- Bureau of Alcohol, Tobacco, Firearms and Explosives (ATF)
- Bureau of Prisons
  - Federal Prison Industries (aka Unicor)
  - National Institute of Corrections
- Community Relations Service
- Drug Enforcement Administration
  - El Paso Intelligence Center
  - Office of National Security Intelligence
- Executive Office for Immigration Review
  - Board of Immigration Appeals
- Executive Office for Organized Crime Drug Enforcement Task Forces
- Executive Office for United States Attorneys
- Executive Office for United States Trustees
- Federal Bureau of Investigation (FBI)
  - Intelligence Branch
  - National Security Branch
    - Counterterrorism Division
  - Criminal, Cyber, Response, and Services Branch
    - Critical Incident Response Group
    - National Center for the Analysis of Violent Crime
    - Strategic Information and Operations Center
    - Crisis Negotiation Unit
    - Behavioral Analysis Unit
  - Science and Technology Branch
    - FBI Laboratory
    - FBI Criminal Justice Information Services Division
  - Information and Technology Branch
  - Human Resources Branch
    - FBI Academy
  - National Gang Intelligence Center
- Foreign Claims Settlement Commission of the United States
- INTERPOL Washington – United States National Central Bureau
- Office of Community Oriented Policing Services
- Office of Justice Programs
  - Bureau of Justice Assistance
  - Bureau of Justice Statistics
  - National Criminal Justice Reference Service
  - National Institute of Justice
  - Office for Victims of Crime
  - Office of Juvenile Justice and Delinquency Prevention
  - Office of Sex Offender Sentencing, Monitoring, Apprehending, Registering, and Tracking (SMART)
- Office of Legal Counsel
- Office of Legal Policy
- Office of the Pardon Attorney
- Office on Violence Against Women
- Offices of the United States Attorneys
- United States Marshals Service
  - Justice Prisoner Air Transportation System
- United States Parole Commission
- Office of Information Policy
- Office of Legislative Affairs
- Office of Public Affairs
- Office of Professional Responsibility
- Office of the Inspector General
- Office of Tribal Justice
- Professional Responsibility Advisory Office

== United States Department of Labor (DOL) ==
Seal of the United States Department of Labor.

=== Office of the Secretary (OSEC) ===
- Executive Secretary
- Centers for Faith and Opportunity Initiative
- Office of the Ombudsman for the Energy Employees Occupational Illness Programs
- Office of Public Liaison

==== Offices under the Deputy Secretary of Labor ====
- Office of the Assistant Secretary for Administration and Management
- Office of the Assistant Secretary for Policy
- Office of the Chief Financial Officer
- Office of the Chief Information Officer
- Office of Congressional and Intergovernmental Affairs
- Office of Emergency Management
- Office of Federal Contract Compliance Programs
- Office of Labor-Management Standards
- Office of Public Affairs
- Office of Disability Employment Policy
- Office of the Solicitor
- Office of Worker's Compensation Program

==== Administrations ====
- Employee Benefits Security Administration
- Employment and Training Administration
- Mine Safety and Health Administration
- Occupational Safety and Health Administration

==== Boards under the Office of Administrative Law Judges ====
- Administrative Review Board
- Benefits Review Board
- Employees' Compensation Appeals Board

==== Bureaus ====
- Bureau of International Labor Affairs
- Bureau of Labor Statistics
- Women's Bureau

==== Miscellaneous ====
- Veterans' Employment and Training Service
- Wage and Hour Division
- Wirtz Labor Library (National Labor Library)

== United States Department of State (DOS) ==
Seal of the United States Department of State.

=== Office of the Secretary ===
- Chief of Staff to the Secretary of State
- Bureau of Intelligence and Research
- Bureau of Legislative Affairs
- Office of the Legal Adviser
- Executive Secretariat
  - Operations Center
  - Executive Secretariat Staff
    - Advance and Staffing Division
    - Records and Information Management Division
  - Executive Office of the Executive Secretariat
  - ExecTech Office
- Office of the Chief of Protocol
- Counselor of the Department
- Policy Planning Staff
  - Secretary's Foreign Affairs Policy Board
- Office of Civil Rights and Ombudsman
- Foreign Service Grievance Board
- Secretary's Open Forum
- Office of Hostage Affairs
- Office of Inspector General

=== Reporting to the Under Secretary for Political Affairs ===
- Bureau of African Affairs
- Bureau of East Asian and Pacific Affairs
- Bureau of European and Eurasian Affairs
- Bureau of International Organization Affairs
- Bureau of Near Eastern Affairs
- Bureau of South and Central Asian Affairs
- Bureau of Western Hemisphere Affairs

=== Reporting to the Under Secretary for Environment, Energy, and Economic Growth ===
- Bureau of Economic and Business Affairs
- Bureau of Oceans and International Environmental and Scientific Affairs
- Bureau of Cyberspace and Digital Policy
- Office of the Chief Economist

=== Reporting to the Under Secretary for Arms Control and International Security ===
- Bureau of Arms Control and Nonproliferation
- Bureau for International Narcotics and Law Enforcement Affairs
- Bureau of Political-Military Affairs
  - Office of Weapons Removal and Abatement
- International Security Advisory Board
- Bureau of Counterterrorism
- Bureau of Emerging Threats

=== Reporting to the Under Secretary for Public Diplomacy and Public Affairs ===
- Bureau of Educational and Cultural Affairs
- Bureau of Global Public Affairs
- Office of Policy, Planning and Resources for Public Affairs and Public Diplomacy
- International Expositions Unit
- United States Advisory Commission on Public Diplomacy

=== Reporting to the Under Secretary for Management ===
- Bureau of Administration
- Bureau of Budget and Planning
- Bureau of the Comptroller and Global Financial Services
- Bureau of Diplomatic Technology
  - Diplomatic Telecommunications Service
- Bureau of Human Resources
  - Office of the Director General of the Foreign Service and Director of Global Talent
- Foreign Service Institute
- Bureau of Consular Affairs
- Bureau of Diplomatic Security (DS)
  - Diplomatic Security Service (DSS)
  - Diplomatic Courier Service
  - Rewards for Justice Program
- Bureau of Overseas Buildings Operations
- Office of Foreign Missions (OFM)
- Bureau of Medical Services
- Director of Diplomatic Reception Rooms
- Office of the White House Liaison

=== Under Secretary of State for Foreign Assistance, Humanitarian Affairs and Religious Freedom ===
- Bureau of Democracy, Human Rights, and Labor
- Bureau of Population, Refugees, and Migration
- Bureau of Global Health Security and Diplomacy
- Bureau of Disaster and Humanitarian Response
- Office of Foreign Assistance Oversight

=== Permanent diplomatic missions ===
- United States Mission to the African Union
- United States Mission to the Association of Southeast Asian Nations
- United States Mission to International Organizations in Vienna
- United States Mission to the European Union
- United States Mission to the International Civil Aviation Organization
- United States Mission to the North Atlantic Treaty Organization
- United States Mission to the Organisation for Economic Co-operation and Development
- United States Mission to the Organization of American States
- United States Mission to the Organization for Security and Cooperation in Europe
- United States Mission to the United Nations
- United States Mission to the UN Agencies in Rome
- United States Mission to the United Nations Office and Other International Organizations in Geneva

== United States Department of Transportation ==
Seal of the United States Department of Transportation.

=== Operating administrations ===
- Office of the Secretary
  - Immediate Office of the Secretary of Transportation
  - Office of the Deputy Secretary
  - Office of the Under Secretary of Transportation for Policy
    - Office of the Assistant Secretary for Transportation Policy
      - Office of the Chief Economist
      - Infrastructure Permitting Improvement Center
    - Office of the Assistant Secretary for Research and Technology
      - Bureau of Transportation Statistics
        - National Transportation Library
      - John A. Volpe National Transportation Systems Center
    - Office of the Assistant Secretary for Aviation and International Affairs
    - National Surface Transportation and Innovative Finance Bureau
  - Office of the Executive Secretariat
  - Office of Intelligence, Security, and Emergency Response
  - Office of the Chief Information Officer
  - Office of Public Affairs
  - Office of Public Engagement
  - Office of the Chief Financial Officer and Assistant Secretary for Budget and Programs
  - Office of the General Counsel
  - Office of the Assistant Secretary for Governmental Affairs
  - Office of Tribal Government Affairs
  - Office of the Assistant Secretary for Administration
    - Office of Hearings
  - Departmental Office of Civil Rights
    - Advisory Committee on Transportation Equity
  - Office of Small and Disadvantaged Business Utilization
  - Office of Drug and Alcohol Policy and Compliance
- Office of Inspector General
- Federal Aviation Administration
- Federal Highway Administration
- Federal Motor Carrier Safety Administration
- Federal Railroad Administration
- Federal Transit Administration
- Great Lakes St. Lawrence Seaway Development Corporation
- Maritime Administration
  - United States Merchant Marine Academy
- National Highway Traffic Safety Administration
- Pipeline and Hazardous Materials Safety Administration

== United States Department of the Treasury ==
Seal of the United States Department of the Treasury.

=== Departmental offices ===
- Office of the Secretary
  - Office of the Deputy Secretary
  - Office of the Chief of Staff
- Office of Inspector General
- Office of General Counsel
- Office of Legislative Affairs
- Office of Management
- Office of Public Affairs
- Office of Domestic Finance
  - Office of Financial Institutions
    - Community Development Financial Institutions Fund
    - Financial Stability Oversight Council
    - Office of Financial Research
    - Terrorism Risk Insurance Program
    - Small Business Lending Fund
    - Federal Insurance Office
  - Office of Financial Markets
    - Federal Financing Bank
  - Office of Fiscal Service
  - Office of Financial Stability
- Office of Economic Policy
- Office of International Affairs
  - Committee on Foreign Investment in the United States
  - Office of Technical Assistance
- Office of Tax Policy
- Office of Terrorism and Financial Intelligence
  - Office of Foreign Assets Control
  - Office of Intelligence and Analysis
  - Office of Terrorist Financing and Financial Crimes
    - Treasury Executive Office for Asset Forfeiture
- Office of the Treasurer of the United States

=== Bureaus ===
- Alcohol and Tobacco Tax and Trade Bureau
- Bureau of Engraving and Printing
- Bureau of the Fiscal Service
- Financial Crimes Enforcement Network
- Internal Revenue Service (IRS)
- Office of the Comptroller of the Currency
- Office of the Treasury Inspector General for Tax Administration
- United States Mint

== United States Department of Veterans Affairs ==
Seal of the United States Department of Veterans Affairs.

=== Office of the Secretary of Veterans Affairs ===
- Office of General Counsel
- Office of Management
- Office of Human Resources and Administration/Operations, Security, and Preparedness
- Office of Information and Technology
- Office of Enterprise Integration
- Office of Public and Intergovernmental Affairs
- Office of Congressional and Legislative Affairs
- Office of Acquisition, Logistics, and Construction
- Office of Accountability and Whistleblower Protection
- Veterans Experience Office
- Office of Electronic Health Record Modernization
- Office of Inspector General

=== Agencies ===
- Board of Veterans' Appeals (BVA)
- National Cemetery Administration (NCA)
- Veterans Benefits Administration (VBA)
- Veterans Health Administration (VHA)

== Independent agencies, tribunals, and government-owned corporations ==
=== Administration, records, and federal property ===
- Administrative Conference of the United States
- Council of the Inspectors General on Integrity and Efficiency
- Federal Accounting Standards Advisory Board
- Fiscal Responsibility and Reform Commission
- General Services Administration (GSA)
  - Federal Systems Integration and Management Center
  - USAGov (formerly Federal Citizen Information Center)
  - Office of the President-Elect
- National Archives and Records Administration (NARA)
  - Information Security Oversight Office
    - Public Interest Declassification Board
  - Office of the Federal Register
  - Office of Presidential Libraries

=== Civil rights ===
- Commission on Civil Rights
- Equal Employment Opportunity Commission (EEOC)
- National Advisory Council on Violence Against Women
- National Council on Disability
- Privacy and Civil Liberties Oversight Board (PCLOB)

=== Civil service ===
- Merit Systems Protection Board (MSPB)
- Office of Government Ethics (OGE)
- Office of Personnel Management (OPM)
  - Human Resources University
  - USOPM Office of the Inspector General
  - Federal Executive Institute
  - Chief Acquisition Officers Council
  - Chief Human Capital Officers Council
  - Chief Financial Officers Council
  - Chief Information Officers Council
- Office of Special Counsel (OSC)

=== Commerce ===
- Federal Trade Commission (FTC)
  - FTC Office of the Inspector General
- Consumer Product Safety Commission (CPSC)
  - CPSC Office of the Inspector General
- Federal Communications Commission (FCC)
  - Universal Service Fund
  - Radio Amateur Civil Emergency Service
- Federal Housing Finance Agency
- United States International Trade Commission

=== Defense and security ===
- Central Intelligence Agency (CIA)
  - Central Intelligence Agency Security Protective Service
- Court of Appeals for the Armed Forces
- Court of Appeals for Veterans Claims
- Defense Nuclear Facilities Safety Board
- Office of the Director of National Intelligence (ODNI)
  - National Intelligence Board
  - Office of the National Counterintelligence Executive
  - Intelligence Advanced Research Projects Activity
- National Security Commission on Artificial Intelligence
- Selective Service System

=== Elections ===
- Election Assistance Commission (EAC)
  - EAC Office of Inspector General
- Federal Election Commission (FEC)
  - FEC Office of Inspector General

=== Education and broadcasting ===
- Helen Keller National Center
- Institute of Museum and Library Services
- U.S. Agency for Global Media (USAGM)
  - Voice of America (VOA)
  - Radio Free Europe/Radio Liberty (RFE/RL)
  - Radio y Television Marti
  - Radio Free Asia (RFA)
  - Middle Eastern Broadcasting Networks
  - International Broadcasting Bureau
- National Endowment for the Arts (NEA)
- National Endowment for the Humanities (NEH)
- Barry M. Goldwater Scholarship in Excellence and Education Program
- James Madison Memorial Fellowship Foundation
- Harry S. Truman Scholarship Foundation
- Morris K. Udall and Stewart L. Udall Foundation

=== Energy, science, and technology ===
- Federal Laboratory Consortium for Technology Transfer
- National Aeronautics and Space Administration (NASA)
- National Science Board
  - National Science Foundation (NSF)
    - National Center for Science and Engineering Statistics
    - United States Antarctic Program
    - University Corporation for Atmospheric Research
      - National Center for Atmospheric Research
- United States Arctic Research Commission
- Nuclear Regulatory Commission (NRC)
- Office of the Federal Coordinator, Alaska Natural Gas Transportation Projects
- Tennessee Valley Authority (TVA)
  - Tennessee Valley Authority Police

=== Foreign relations ===
- African Development Foundation
- Commission on Security and Cooperation in Europe (Helsinki Commission)
- Export–Import Bank of the United States (EXIM)
- Inter-American Foundation
- Japan–United States Friendship Commission
- U.S. Commission for the Preservation of America's Heritage Abroad
- United States Commission on International Religious Freedom (USCIRF)
- U.S. International Development Finance Corporation
- U.S. Trade and Development Agency

=== Interior ===
- Advisory Council on Historic Preservation
- American Battle Monuments Commission (ABMC)
- Environmental Protection Agency (EPA)
  - Office of Enforcement and Compliance Assurance
- Federal Geographic Data Committee
- Marine Mammal Commission
- Presidio Trust
- Appalachian Regional Commission
- Delta Regional Authority
- Denali Commission
- Delaware River Basin Commission
- Susquehanna River Basin Commission
- Migratory Birds Conservation Commission
- National Indian Gaming Commission
- Northern Border Regional Commission
- Northwest Power and Conservation Council
- United States territorial courts
  - District Court of Guam
  - District Court for the Northern Mariana Islands
  - District Court of the Virgin Islands
- Utah Reclamation Mitigation and Conservation Commission

=== Labor ===
- Federal Labor Relations Authority
- Federal Mediation and Conciliation Service
- Federal Mine Safety and Health Review Commission
- National Labor Relations Board (NLRB)
- National Mediation Board
- Occupational Safety and Health Review Commission
- Chemical Safety Board

=== Monetary and financial ===
- Commodity Futures Trading Commission (CFTC)
- Consumer Financial Protection Bureau (CFPB)
- Court of Federal Claims
- Farm Credit Administration
- Federal Reserve System
  - Federal Reserve Police
  - Federal Reserve Bank of Boston
  - Federal Reserve Bank of New York
  - Federal Reserve Bank of Philadelphia
  - Federal Reserve Bank of Richmond
  - Federal Reserve Bank of Atlanta
  - Federal Reserve Bank of Chicago
  - Federal Reserve Bank of St. Louis
  - Federal Reserve Bank of Minneapolis
  - Federal Reserve Bank of Kansas City
  - Federal Reserve Bank of Dallas
  - Federal Reserve Bank of San Francisco
- Federal Deposit Insurance Corporation (FDIC)
- National Credit Union Administration (NCUA)
  - Central Liquidity Facility
- Securities and Exchange Commission (SEC)
- Securities Investor Protection Corporation
- Small Business Administration (SBA)
- United States Tax Court

=== Postal ===
- Postal Regulatory Commission (PRC)
- United States Postal Service (USPS)
  - United States Postal Inspection Service (USPIS)
    - US Postal Service Police
  - Citizens' Stamp Advisory Committee
  - USPS Office of the Inspector General
  - US Philatelic Bureau
    - US Stamp Printing Service

=== Retirement and healthcare ===
- Federal Retirement Thrift Investment Board
  - Thrift Savings Plan (TSP)
- Medicaid and CHIP Payment and Access Commission
- Medicare Payment Advisory Commission
- National Bipartisan Commission on the Future of Medicare
- Railroad Retirement Board
- Social Security Administration (SSA)
- Social Security Advisory Board

=== Seat of government ===
- Court Services and Offender Supervision Agency
- National Capital Planning Commission (NCPC)
- Commission of Fine Arts

=== Transportation ===
- Amtrak (National Railroad Passenger Corporation)
  - Amtrak Police
- Federal Maritime Commission
- National Transportation Safety Board (NTSB)
- Surface Transportation Board (STB)
  - The Office of the Chief Counsel
  - The Office of the Managing Director
  - The Office of Environmental Analysis
  - The Office of Economics
  - The Office of Public Assistance, Governmental Affairs, and Compliance (OPAGAC)

=== Volunteerism ===
- Corporation for National and Community Service
  - AmeriCorps
    - AmeriCorps VISTA
    - Senior Corps
    - National Civilian Community Corps (NCCC)
  - Presidential Freedom Scholarship Program
  - President's Volunteer Service Award
- Peace Corps

== Joint programs and interagency agencies ==
- Committee for the Implementation of Textile Agreements
- Federal Financial Institutions Examination Council
- Federal Interagency Committee on Education
- Federal Interagency Council on Statistical Policy
- Federal Interagency Committee for the Management of Noxious and Exotic Weeds
- Interagency Alternative Dispute Resolution Working Group
- Joint Fire Science Program
- National Interagency Fire Center
- United States Interagency Council on Homelessness

== Special Inspector General Office ==
- Special Inspector General for Afghanistan Reconstruction

== Quasi-official organizations ==
=== Arts and culture ===
- Corporation for Public Broadcasting (CPB)
- Corporation for Travel Promotion
- National Public Radio (NPR)
- Public Broadcasting Service (PBS)
- Smithsonian Institution
  - John F. Kennedy Center for the Performing Arts
  - National Gallery of Art
  - Smithsonian Police (Smithsonian Institution Office of Protection Services)
    - National Zoological Police
  - Woodrow Wilson International Center for Scholars

=== Memorial ===
- United States Holocaust Memorial Museum

=== Commerce and technology ===
- North American Electric Reliability Corporation
- Municipal Securities Rulemaking Board
- National Futures Association
- Public Company Accounting Oversight Board
- Financial Industry Regulatory Authority
- Federal National Mortgage Association (Fannie Mae)
- Federal Home Loan Mortgage Corporation (Freddie Mac)
- Federal Home Loan Banks
- Farm Credit System
- U.S. Civilian Research & Development Foundation
- U.S. Steel Corporation

=== Defense and diplomacy ===
- American Institute in Taiwan
- East–West Center
- Millennium Challenge Corporation
- National Endowment for Democracy
- United States Institute of Peace
- Henry M. Jackson Foundation for the Advancement of Military Medicine

=== Human service and community development ===
- National Industries for the Blind
- Neighborhood Reinvestment Corporation
- Access Board
- AbilityOne Commission
- National Institute of Building Sciences

=== Interior ===
- National Fish and Wildlife Foundation
- National Park Foundation

=== Law and justice ===
- Legal Services Corporation
- State Justice Institute
- Vera Institute of Justice
- National Center for Missing & Exploited Children

== See also ==
- Congressionally chartered organizations
- Federal Advisory Committee Act
- Government-sponsored enterprises
- List of defunct or renamed United States federal agencies
- State-owned enterprises of the United States
- Federally funded research and development centers
- University Affiliated Research Center
- Number of United States political appointments by agency
- List of United States federal research and development agencies
