= Political positions of Cory Booker =

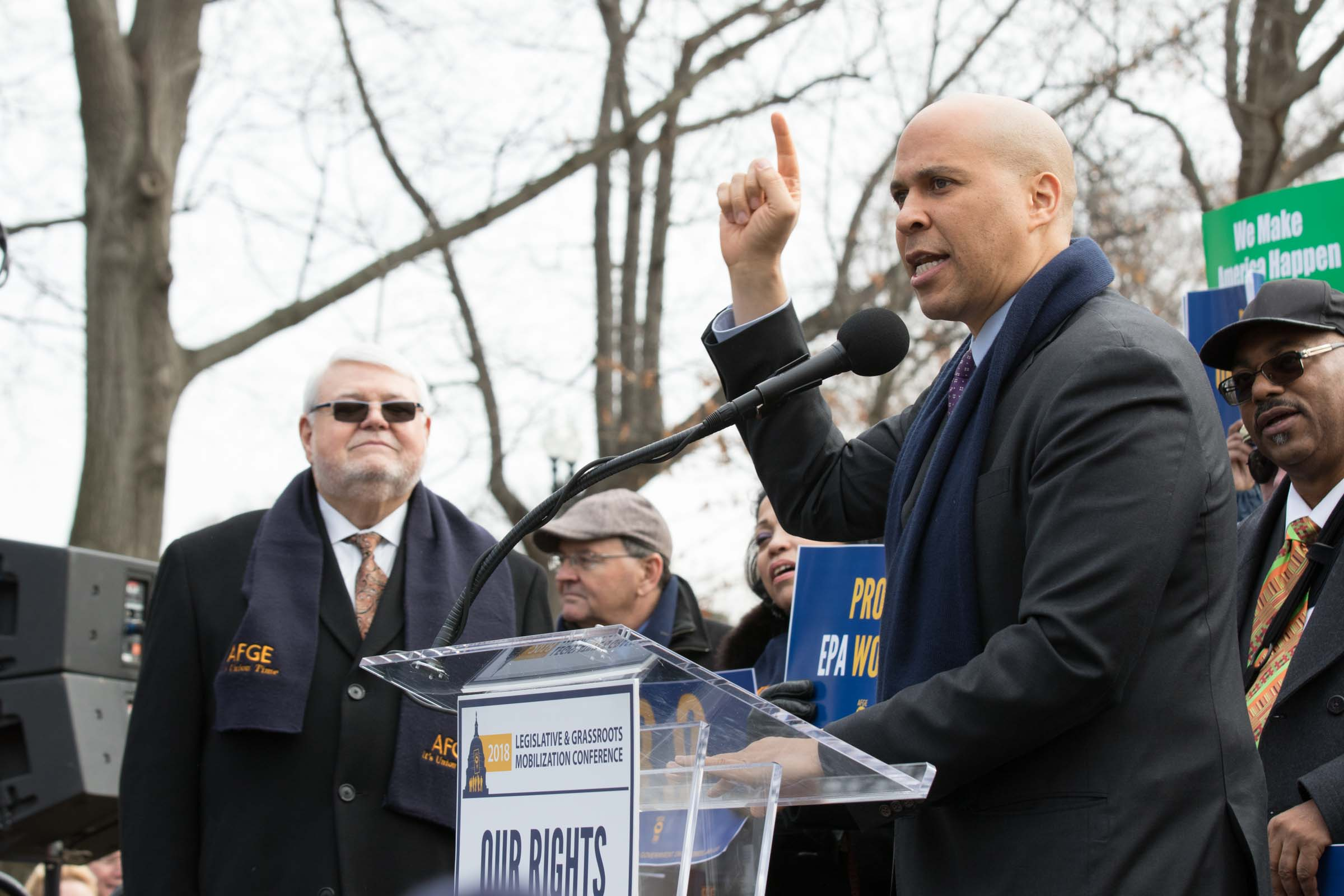
Booker speaks at an American Federation of Government Employees rally in 2018

Cory Booker is the senior United States senator from New Jersey and a member of the Democratic Party. He was previously the 36th mayor of Newark from 2006 to 2013. Before that Booker served on the Newark City Council for the Central Ward from 1998 to 2002.

Booker has been called a liberal and progressive Democrat. As a senator, he has a liberal voting record. In a July 2013 Salon interview, Booker said, "there's nothing in that realm of progressive politics where you won't find me." In a September 2013 interview with The Grio, when asked whether he considered himself a progressive, he said he was a Democrat and an American. According to the Humane Society, Booker has had the most pro-animal welfare voting record in the Senate year after year.

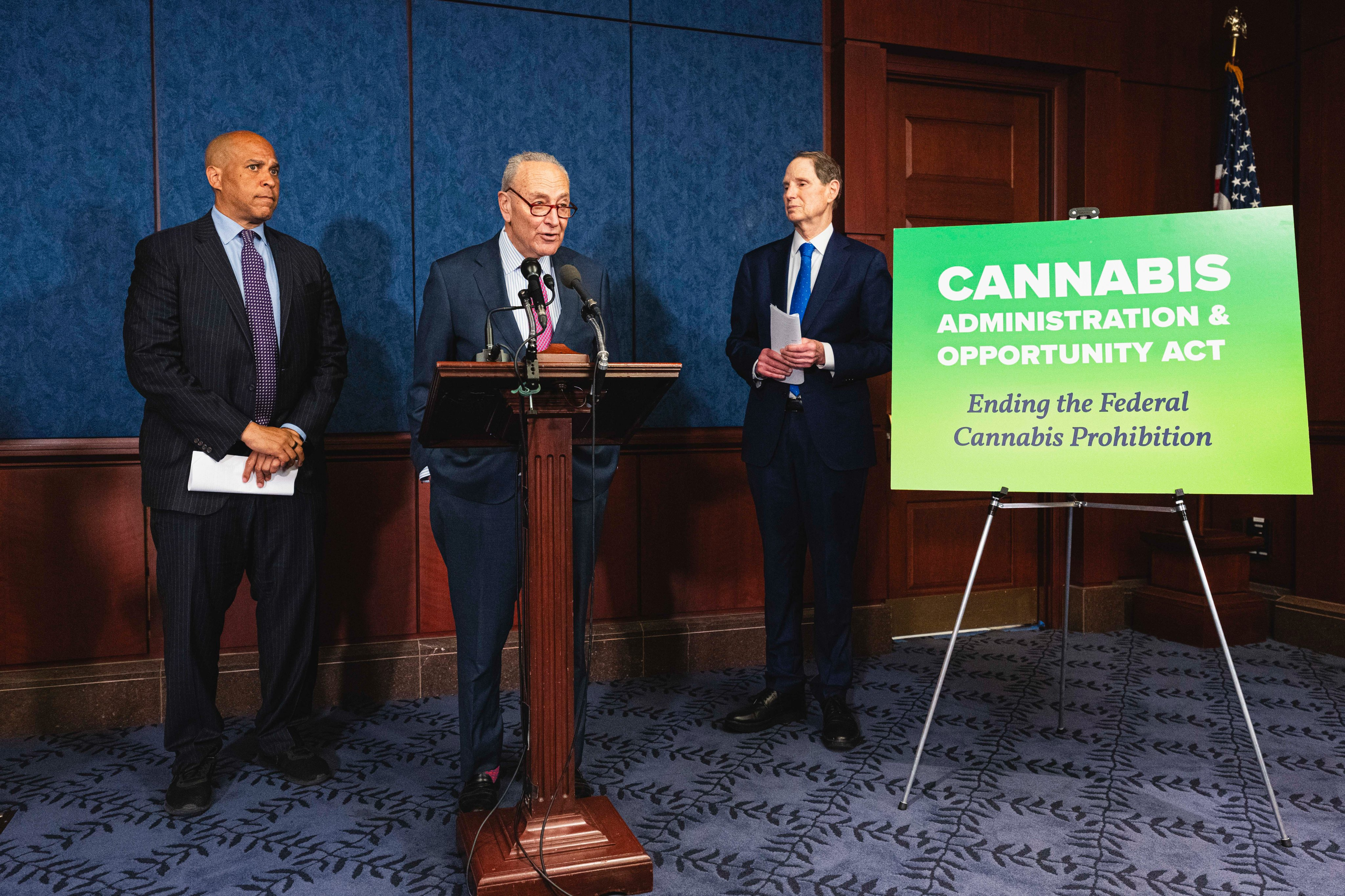
Booker along with Senators Schumer and Wyden unveil the Cannabis Administration and Opportunity Act in May 2024

Booker supports long-term deficit reduction efforts for economic growth, cap and trade taxation to combat climate change, and increased funding for education. He has spoken in favor of creating a federal job guarantee and baby bonds (low-risk savings accounts that minors get access to at age 18). In the Senate, he has emphasized issues of racial and social justice. He played a leading role in the push to pass the First Step Act, a bipartisan criminal justice reform bill. He supports ending the war on drugs and the legalization of cannabis. Booker supports abortion rights and affirmative action. He supports LGBTQ+ rights, voting for the Respect for Marriage Act in 2022. Booker also supports a single-payer health care plan: in September 2017, he joined Bernie Sanders and 14 other co-sponsors in submitting a single-payer health care plan to Congress called the "Medicare for All" bill. Booker opposes abolishing private health insurance. Along with Senate Republicans in 2017, Booker voted against a measure to allow cheaper prescription drugs to be imported from Canada, citing concerns about the safety of Canadian drugs, which lead to the defeat of the measure. He faced progressive criticism for his vote. Booker is one of the Senate's top financial recipients from the drug industry.

After the US strike on Syria in April 2017, Booker criticized military action "without a clear plan" or authorization from Congress.

Booker supports a two-state solution to the Israeli–Palestinian conflict. He has said that Iran is a direct threat to U.S. and Israeli security and feels all options should be on the table for dealing with the conflict, but his decision to back the Iran nuclear deal framework damaged his long-term relationship with some Jewish voters and supporters. In an attempt to reduce the damage, he initiated an emergency summit for Jewish leaders, which some of his longstanding supporters did not attend. Booker was the sole Democratic co-sponsor of the Israel Anti-Boycott Act, receiving criticism from free speech advocates. From 2013 to 2024, he declared receiving $871,563 in funding from pro-Israel donors. In 2025, Booker was in a minority of Senate Democrats that voted not to block the sale of military arms to Israel despite rising death tolls from its war on Gaza and restrictions on humanitarian aid resulting in severe cases of starvation. Booker has consistently voted for arms sales to Israel and against Bernie Sanders' resolutions to condition military aid to Israel amidst the Gaza Strip famine and humanitarian crisis, saying that it "would restrict our country's ability to provide future security guarantees without achieving the goal of ending this war now or increasing vital humanitarian aid".

Despite his reputation as a progressive except Palestine, progressives have criticized Booker for various reasons. In 2017, he voted against a proposal to lower prescription drug prices, which led to criticism that he was too dependent on corporate support. In 2021, The American Prospect criticized Booker and Bob Menendez for recommending Christine O'Hearne to a federal judgeship after she had spent much of her career defending employers against discrimination and sexual harassment claims, and had defended a school against allegations that its swim coach had sexually abused a girl from ages 13 to 19.

== Domestic policy ==
=== Affirmative action ===
When asked if affirmative action in university admissions should be based on class or race or banned completely, Booker said both race and class should be considered and cited the 2003 U.S. Supreme Court ruling Grutter v. Bollinger.

=== Agriculture ===
In June 2019, Booker was one of 18 Democratic senators who had sent a letter to USDA Inspector General (IG) Phyllis Fong with the request that the IG investigate USDA instances of retaliation and political decision-making and asserted that not conducting an investigation would mean these "actions could be perceived as a part of this administration’s broader pattern of not only discounting the value of federal employees, but suppressing, undermining, discounting, and wholesale ignoring scientific data produced by their own qualified scientists."

=== Animal welfare ===
According to the Humane Society, Booker has the most pro-animal welfare voting record in the Senate year after year. Booker has proposed legislation designed to improve animal welfare, including a bill that would ban the construction of new large concentrated animal feeding operations (called "factory farms" by critics) and close existing ones by 2040.

=== Anti-lynching ===
In June 2018, Booker joined with the Senate's other two black members, Kamala Harris and Tim Scott to introduce a bill to make lynching a federal hate crime. Sixteen other Senators signed on as the initial cosponsors, and the bill was supported by Majority Leader Mitch McConnell. Between 1882 and 1986, nearly 200 anti-lynching bills were introduced in Congress, yet none had passed the Senate until this bill passed unanimously on December 19, 2018. The bill was referred to the House of Representatives where it died for lack of action by that body.

=== Budget ===
When Cory Booker became Mayor of Newark, New Jersey in 2006, he was facing a $180 million budget crisis. When he left his office in 2013, he left the city with a balanced budget for the first time in a decade, twice as much affordable housing, two new hotels, a spate of made-over parks, a new residential tower, two (possibly three) new office towers, $150 million educational complex in the heart of Newark's downtown, and a larger population than when he entered office. He managed to balance the budget by raising taxes 20%, laying off hundreds of cops, cutting spending, and working with private sector-led urban development from wealthy investors.

Booker supports smart spending and investment now with long-term deficit reduction efforts to ensure economic prosperity.

=== Census ===
In June 2019, Booker was one of 28 senators to sign a letter led by Brian Schatz to Secretary of Commerce Wilbur Ross warning that Ross would "further delay and jeopardize the Census Bureau's ability to conduct a full, fair, and accurate decennial census as required by the U.S. Constitution and the Census Act" by continuing to attempt adding the citizenship question to 2020 census materials. The senators urged Ross to "allow the Census Bureau to proceed with preparation for a 2020 census without a citizenship question on the questionnaire."

=== Child care ===
In 2019, Booker was one of 35 senators to introduce the Child Care for Working Families Act, a bill that created 770,000 new child care jobs and that ensured families under 75 percent of the state median income did not pay for child care with higher earning families having to pay "their fair share for care on a sliding scale, regardless of the number of children they have." The legislation also supported universal access to high-quality preschool programs for all 3 and 4-year-olds and gave the child care workforce a changed compensation and training to aid both teachers and caregivers.

=== Civil liberties ===
He has called for amending the Patriot Act and said he was "troubled" by the revelations of the scope of the National Security Agency's secret spy programs, but has shied away from specifics. He voted for the USA Freedom Act, which re-authorized certain provisions of the Patriot Act in modified form.

=== Climate change ===
Booker accepts the consensus that climate change is man-made and supports cap-and-trade or carbon tax approach in dealing with greenhouse gas emissions.

In October 2017, Booker was one of 19 senators to sign a letter to Environmental Protection Agency administrator Scott Pruitt questioning Pruitt's decision to repeal the Clean Power Plan, asserting that the repeal's proposal used "mathematical sleights of hand to over-state the costs of industry compliance with the 2015 Rule and understate the benefits that will be lost if the 2017 repeal is finalized" and science denying and math fabricating would fail to "satisfy the requirements of the law, nor will it slow the increase in frequency and intensity of extreme weather events, the inexorable rise in sea levels, or the other dire effects of global warming that our planet is already experiencing."

In September 2018, Booker was one of eight senators to sponsor the Climate Risk Disclosure Act, a bill described by cosponsor Elizabeth Warren as using "market forces to speed up the transition from fossil fuels to cleaner energy — reducing the odds of an environmental and financial disaster without spending a dime of taxpayer money."

In November 2018, Booker was one of 25 Democratic senators to cosponsor a resolution specifying key findings of the Intergovernmental Panel On Climate Change report and National Climate Assessment. The resolution affirmed the senators' acceptance of the findings and their support for bold action toward addressing climate change.

In March 2019, Booker was one of 11 senators to sponsor the Climate Security Act of 2019, legislation that would form a new group within the State Department that would have the responsibility for developing strategies to integrate climate science and data into operations of national security as well as restoring the post of special envoy for the Arctic, which had been dismantled by President Trump in 2017. The proposed envoy would advise the president and the administration on the potential effects of climate on national security and be responsible for facilitating all interagency communication between federal science and security agencies.

In June 2019, Booker was one of 44 senators to introduce the International Climate Accountability Act, legislation that would prevent President Trump from using funds in an attempt to withdraw from the Paris Agreement and directing the president's administration to instead develop a strategic plan for the United States that would allow it to meet its commitment under the Paris Agreement.

At the Detroit Democratic debate on July 31, 2019, Booker stated that no one "should get applause when they say they’re going to rejoin the Paris climate accord" as he advocated for more advanced thinking and stated that climate change would only be handled if the United States led on the subject and that it must be "the issue and the lens with which we view every issue."

On August 8, 2019, Booker unveiled the Climate Stewardship Act of 2019, legislation that would work toward a goal of supporting voluntary climate stewardship practices on over at least 100 million acres of farmland in addition to planting over 15 billion trees as part of an effort to tackle deforestation and implement an expansion of urban tree cover that would restore at least two million acres of coastal wetlands along with investing in renewable energy sources for farmers and rural small businesses. Booker said the bill was inspired by the New Deal of President Franklin D. Roosevelt and that it would "not only reduce emissions and substantially increase carbon sequestration, but will also create hundreds of thousands of new jobs, enhance biodiversity by restoring tens of millions of acres of habitat, and make our farms more resilient and competitive."

=== Confederate monuments ===
In August 2017, Booker announced his plan to create a bill ordering the removal of Confederate monuments and memorials from the Capitol Building after Labor Day of that year.

=== Antitrust, competition, and corporate regulation ===
In June 2019, Booker was one of six Democrats led by Amy Klobuchar in signing letters to the Federal Trade Commission (FTC) and the Department of Justice recounting that many of them had "called on both the FTC and the Justice Department to investigate potential anticompetitive activity in these markets, particularly following the significant enforcement actions taken by foreign competition enforcers against these same companies" and requested both agencies confirm whether or not opened antitrust investigations had been opened by them regarding each of the companies and for both agencies to pledge they will publicly release any such investigation's findings.

In June 2019, along with Bernie Sanders and Elizabeth Warren, Booker sent a letter to the Federal Communications Commission (FCC) and Department of Justice requesting an investigation into the acquisition of 21 regional sports networks by Sinclair Broadcast Group as the senators found Sinclair to have "an explicit interest in, and commitment to, relaying partisan political messages to its viewers — making its recent anti competitive expansion attempts into millions of additional households all the more concerning."

=== Criminal justice reform ===
Booker has been a prominent advocate for changing the way convicted felons are sentenced and how they are treated upon release. Early in his Senate career, Booker teamed up with Senator Rand Paul on sentencing reform in order to "cut government spending and help make it easier for nonviolent criminals to eventually secure a job." His efforts led to Senate passage in December 2018 of The First Step Act, a bipartisan bill that expands job-training programs to reduce recidivism, expands early-release programs, and modifies mandatory-sentencing laws for non-violent drug offenders. In addition to being one of the bill's most active proponents, Booker pushed for the final bill to include a virtual ban on juvenile solitary confinement in federal prisons. The bill subsequently passed the House and was signed into law by President Donald Trump on December 21, 2018.

In July 2017, along with Elizabeth Warren, Dick Durbin, and Kamala Harris, Booker was one of four senators to introduce the Dignity for Incarcerated Women Act, legislation implementing a ban on the shackling of pregnant women and mandating the Bureau of Prisons to form superior visitation policies for parents along with providing parenting classes and offering health products such as tampons and pads for free. The bill also restricted prison employees from entering restrooms of the opposite sex with the exception of pressing circumstances. In 2019, Booker reintroduced the bill with Warren and Representatives Pramila Jayapal and Karen Bass, saying in a statement, "Women face unique circumstances in prison. They are often victims of sexual abuse and trauma, and a majority are moms to small kids. The current federal prison system is not properly designed to address these unique circumstance. It’s time we restore justice to our broken justice system."

Booker joined Elijah Cummings, Doug Collins, and Ron Johnson to introduce the Fair Chance Act in February 2019.

=== District of Columbia Statehood ===
Booker supports statehood for the District of Columbia.

=== Economy ===
Booker is in favor of creating so-called "baby bonds", whereby newborns would be given low-risk savings accounts (managed by the Treasury) that would be worth tens of thousands of dollars by the age of 18. According to an analysis by Naomi Zwede of the Center on Social Policy and poverty at Columbia University, the baby bonds almost entirely close the racial wealth gap among young people.

In May 2012, Booker defended Bain Capital's record and criticized President Obama's attack on private equity. In response, the Republican National Committee, created a petition called "I Stand With Cory Booker".

In February 2019, Booker was among eight senators to sign a letter to the Federal Communications Commission and the Department of Justice advocating for regulators to renounce a proposed $26 billion merger between T-Mobile and Sprint, writing that American enforcers have understood for the last thirty years "that fostering robust competition in telecommunications markets is the best way to provide every American with access to high-quality, cutting-edge communications at a reasonable price" and the merger would result in a return for "Americans to the dark days of heavily consolidated markets and less competition, with all of the resulting harms."

=== Education ===
Booker sits on the board of advisers of the political action committee Democrats for Education Reform, was on the board of Alliance for School Choice until 2008, co-founded the Excellent Education For Everyone, a board member of the Black Alliance for Educational Options, and has spoken favorably of StudentsFirst. He is an advocate of education reform and privatization of education; supporting things such as charter schools, school vouchers, and merit pay for teachers. In September 2010, with the support of Governor Chris Christie, Booker obtained a $100 million pledge from Facebook Inc. founder Mark Zuckerberg to Newark Public Schools.

=== Free market ===
"Booker championed "enterprise zones," a free-market approach to solving urban blight credited to the late Jack Kemp, a hard-core supply-sider and occasional Republican presidential contender who helped raise money for Booker's first mayoral campaign."

Besides social media advances, Booker wants to see the rest of the tech sector reach its fullest potential, and to do that, he thinks the U.S. government needs to ease up on regulations. "We're not moving at the speed of innovation due to regulations," he said, adding that because of this, key industries are leaving the U.S. to work on projects in other countries where the rules aren't as strict. For example, the Federal Aviation Administration has hindered drone innovation to the point where drone companies are leaving the U.S. to test and build in Europe. "We're being left behind on everything from next-generation nuclear energy to driverless cars and biologics," Booker said, "and we cannot get left behind."

=== Government shutdown ===
In March 2019, Booker and 38 other senators signed a letter to the Appropriations Committee opining that contractor workers and by extension their families "should not be penalized for a government shutdown that they did nothing to cause" while noting that there were bills in both chambers of Congress that if enacted would provide back pay to compensate contractor employees for lost wages before urging the Appropriations Committee "to include back pay for contractor employees in a supplemental appropriations bill for FY2019 or as part of the regular appropriations process for FY2020."

=== Gun policy ===
Booker has publicly defended the right of law-abiding citizens to own legal fire arms and blames most shootings on criminals with illegal guns. He voted to prohibit people on terror watch lists from buying guns. Booker has cosponsored legislation in the 115th Congress and 116th Congress authored by Senator Dianne Feinstein to ban assault weapons.

In January 2016, Booker was one of 18 senators to sign a letter to Thad Cochran and Barbara Mikulski requesting that the Labor, Health and Education subcommittee hold a hearing on whether to allow the Centers for Disease Control and Prevention (CDC) to fund a study of gun violence and "the annual appropriations rider that some have interpreted as preventing it" with taxpayer dollars. The senators noted their support for taking steps "to fund gun-violence research, because only the United States government is in a position to establish an integrated public-health research agenda to understand the causes of gun violence and identify the most effective strategies for prevention."

Following the Las Vegas shooting in October 2017, Booker was one of 24 senators to sign a letter to National Institutes of Health (NIH) Director Dr. Francis Collins espousing the view that it was critical the NIH "dedicate a portion of its resources to the public health consequences of gun violence" at a time when 93 Americans die per day from gun-related fatalities and noted that the Dickey Amendment did not prohibit objective, scientific inquiries into shooting death prevention.

In November 2017, Booker was a cosponsor of the Military Domestic Violence Reporting Enhancement Act, a bill that would form a charge of Domestic Violence under the Uniform Code of Military Justice (UCMJ) and stipulate that convictions would have to be reported to federal databases with the authority to keep abusers from purchasing firearms within three days in an attempt to close a loophole in the Uniform Code of Military Justice (UCMJ) through which convicted abusers retained the ability to purchase firearms.

In January 2019, Booker joined Bernie Sanders and 38 other Democrats in introducing the Background Check Expansion Act, a bill that would require background checks for either the sale or transfer of all firearms including all unlicensed sellers. Exceptions to the bill's background check requirement included transfers between members of law enforcement, loaning firearms for either hunting or sporting events on a temporary basis, providing firearms as gifts to members of one's immediate family, firearms being transferred as part of an inheritance, or giving a firearm to another person temporarily for immediate self-defense.

In February 2019, Booker was one of 38 senators to sign a letter to the Judiciary Committee Chair Lindsey Graham urging him to "hold a hearing" on universal background checks and noted his statement in the press that he "intended to have the Committee work on ‘red flag’ legislation and potentially also background checks, both actions" the senators indicated their support for. Booker joined colleagues in criticizing the language used by American Rifleman magazine, describing it as callous. The magazine - published by the National Rifle Association of America - had run a piece by Chris W. Cox featuring the headline "Target Practice" next to photographs of Nancy Pelosi and Gabrielle Giffords.

=== Healthcare ===
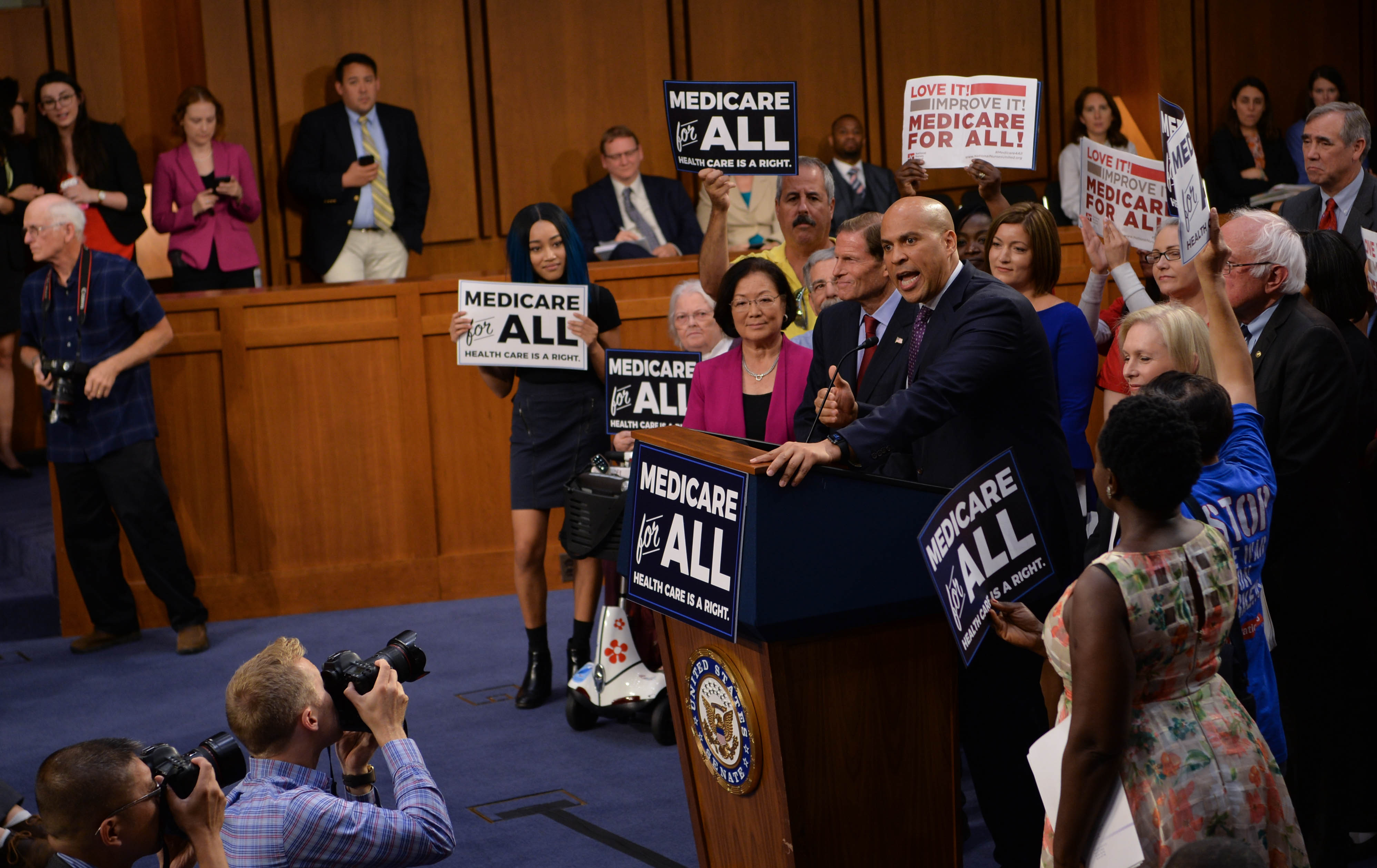
Booker speaks in 2017 in favor a single-payer healthcare system

Booker has called the Affordable Care Act imperfect, said it needs to be improved, and wants to control health care costs. He opposes cutting Medicare, supports expanding the program, and he supports transitioning to a "Medicare for All"-style single-payer healthcare system.

In September 2017, Booker joined Bernie Sanders and 14 other cosponsors in submitting a single-payer health care plan to Congress called the "Medicare for All" bill. The plan also covers vision and dental care, not currently covered by Medicare.

In April 2018, Booker was among 10 senators to sponsor the Choose Medicare Act, an expanded public option for health insurance that also increased Obamacare subsidies and rendered individuals with higher income levels eligible for its assistance.

In January 2019, during the 2018–19 United States federal government shutdown, Booker was one of 34 senators to sign a letter to Food and Drugs Administration Commissioner Scott Gottlieb recognizing the efforts of the FDA to address the effect of the government shutdown on the public health and employees while remaining alarmed "that the continued shutdown will result in increasingly harmful effects on the agency’s employees and the safety and security of the nation’s food and medical products."

In February 2019, Booker and 22 other Democratic senators introduced the State Public Option Act, a bill that would authorize states to form a Medicaid buy-in program for all residents and thereby grant all denizens of the state the ability to buy into a state-driven Medicaid health insurance plan if they wished. Brian Schatz, a bill cosponsor, said the legislation would "unlock each state’s Medicaid program to anyone who wants it, giving people a high-quality, low-cost public health insurance option" and that its goal was "to make sure that every single American has comprehensive health care coverage."

In June 2019, Booker was one of eight senators to cosponsor the Territories Health Equity Act of 2019, a bill that would remove the cap on annual federal Medicaid funding and increase federal matching rate for Medicaid expenditures of territories along with more funds being provided for prescription drug coverage to low-income seniors in an attempt to equalize funding for American territories Puerto Rico, the Virgin Islands, Guam, American Samoa and the Northern Mariana Islands with that of U.S. states.

In June 2019, Booker was one of 15 senators to introduce the Affordable Medications Act, legislation intended to promote transparency through mandating pharmaceutical companies disclose the amount of money going toward research and development in addition to both marketing and executives' salaries. The bill also abolished the restriction that stopped the federal Medicare program from using its buying power to negotiate lower drug prices for beneficiaries and hinder drug company monopoly practices used to keep prices high and disable less expensive generics entering the market.

=== Housing ===
In April 2019, Booker was one of 41 senators to sign a bipartisan letter to the housing subcommittee praising the U.S. Department of Housing and Urban Development's Section 4 Capacity Building program as authorizing "HUD to partner with national nonprofit community development organizations to provide education, training, and financial support to local community development corporations (CDCs) across the country" and expressing disappointment that President Trump's budget "has slated this program for elimination after decades of successful economic and community development." The senators wrote of their hope that the subcommittee would support continued funding for Section 4 in Fiscal Year 2020.

=== Immigration ===
Booker supports the passage of the DREAM Act.

In November 2017, as Democratic senators lobbied for the Senate to pass a bill by the end of year ensuring the continuation of the Deferred Action for Childhood Arrivals program, Booker commented, "These are hardworking young people who were brought to this country as kids by their parents — they don’t know any other home but the United States. I want solutions to protect these kids, and won’t vote for a spending bill that doesn’t include one."

Regarding the report on "Executive Order 13780: Protecting the Nation From Foreign Terrorist Entry..." dated January 2018, Booker criticized that as misleading a year later. In mid-January 2018, during Kirstjen Nielsen's congressional testimony as to whether President Trump made references to "shithole countries", Booker said,

... referring to people ... with the most vile and vulgar language ... When ignorance and bigotry is allied with power, it is a dangerous force ... Your silence and your amnesia is complicity ... I had tears of rage when I heard about this ... For you ... to dismiss some of the questions of my colleagues, saying "I have already answered that line of questions" ... is unacceptable ...

In April 2018, Booker was one of five senators to send a letter to acting director of ICE Thomas Homan on standards used by the agency when determining how to detain a pregnant woman, requesting that pregnant women not be held in custody unless under extraordinary standards after reports "that ICE has failed to provide critical medical care to pregnant women in immigration detention — resulting in miscarriages and other negative health outcomes".

In July 2018, Booker was one of eleven senators to sign a letter requesting the agencies responsible for reuniting families provide weekly updates, until every separated child was returned to their parents, in the form of a list of separated children, a list of their parents and other adult members of their families in addition to a list connecting the lists of children and parents and a briefing for the lawmakers on the strategies used to reunite families, and was one of twenty-two senators to sponsor the Stop Shackling and Detaining Pregnant Women Act, which if enacted would prohibit immigration officers from detaining pregnant women in a majority of circumstances and improve conditions of care for individuals in custody.

In November 2018, Booker was one of eleven senators to sign a letter to Secretary of Defense James Mattis concerning "the overt politicization of the military" with the Trump administration's deployment of 5,800 troops to the U.S.-Mexico border and requesting a briefing and written justification from the U.S. Northern Command for troop deployment while urging Mattis to "curb the unprecedented escalation of DOD involvement in immigration enforcement."

In January 2019, Booker was one of twenty senators to sponsor the Dreamer Confidentiality Act, a bill imposing a ban on the Department of Homeland Security (DHS) from passing information collected on DACA recipients to Immigration and Customs Enforcement (ICE), Customs and Border Protection (CBP), the Department of Justice, or any other law enforcement agency with exceptions in the case of fraudulent claims, national security issues, or non-immigration related felonies being investigated.

In February 2019, Booker was one of sixteen senators to vote against legislation preventing a partial government shutdown and containing 1.375 billion for barriers along the U.S.-Mexico border that included 55 miles of fencing.

In March 2019, Booker voted to block President Trump's national emergency declaration that would have granted him access to $3.6 billion in military construction funding to build border barriers.

In April 2019, Booker signed a letter led by Catherine Cortez Masto to Immigrations and Customs Enforcement and Customs and Border Enforcement asserting that "the civil detention of an expectant mother for potential immigration offenses is never justified" due to the "absence of compelling evidence that the detention of a pregnant woman is necessary because she is a threat to herself or others, or is a threat to public safety or national security". The senators requested the CBP enact measures that would ensure "timely and appropriate treatment" for pregnant women in custody along with both agencies providing information on how available facilities and doctors are for pregnant immigrants and complete data on the number of those currently in custody.

In April 2019, Booker was one of nineteen senators to sign a letter to top members on the Appropriations Committee Richard Shelby and Patrick Leahy and top members of its Homeland Security subcommittee Shelley Moore Capito and Jon Tester indicating that they could not "support the appropriation of funds that would expand this administration’s unnecessarily cruel immigration enforcement policies, its inhumane immigrant detention systems, or its efforts to build the president’s vanity projects" and urging Congress to "resist efforts to raid critical and effective public safety programs in order to pay for political theatrics" as President Trump's "manufactured emergency" was not justification for "spending taxpayer dollars on an ineffective wall."

In June 2019, following the Housing and Urban Development Department's confirmation that DACA recipients did not meet eligibility for federal backed loans, Booker and eleven other senators introduced The Home Ownership Dreamers Act, legislation that mandated that the federal government was not authorized to deny mortgage loans backed by the Federal Housing Administration, Fannie Mae, Freddie Mac, or the Agriculture Department solely due to the immigration status of an applicant.

In June 2019, Booker sent a letter to Senate Judiciary Chairman Lindsey Graham in which he cited May reports by NBC News and The Intercept regarding thousands of immigrants placed in solitary confinement by ICE between 2012 and 2017 in spite of some of the immigrants not violating any rules. Booker opined that it appeared "ICE has been consistently violating its own policy on the use of solitary confinement" and that it was "puzzling how DHS has enough resources to conduct large-scale raids all across the United States" amid the Trump administration claiming that it did not have enough funding to address the humanitarian crisis at the Southwest border.

In June 2019, Booker introduced the Remove Marijuana from Deportable Offenses Act, a bill that would mandate the usage of marijuana, possession and distribution could no longer be cited as grounds for inadmissibility or deportation under the Immigration and Nationality Act. Booker stated that the Trump administration's attempts "to use marijuana possession as a tool for deportation is disgraceful and misguided" and that the bill would "remove another one of ICE’s weapons that have been deployed to execute this Administration’s hardline immigration policy."

On July 2, 2019, Booker unveiled an immigration plan that centered on the use of executive power in directing the United States Department of Homeland Security mandate detention facilities abide by civil detention standards of the American Bar Association and end the use of for-profit detention facilities in addition to reducing the amount of time immigrants spent in detention centers and make immigrants receive better access to legal counsel. The plan would also reverse moves to eliminate protections for Dreamers and implement a Muslim travel ban by the Trump administration and “expand pathways for refugees and those seeking asylum” through barriers being removed ahead of the immigrants seeking asylum along with implementing an increase in both the cap on refugees and border staffing for interviewing those seeking asylum.

In July 2019, following reports that the Trump administration intended to end protections of spouses, parents and children of active-duty service members from deportation, Booker was one of twenty-two senators to sign a letter led by Tammy Duckworth arguing that the program allowed service members the ability "to fight for the United States overseas and not worry that their spouse, children, or parents will be deported while they are away" and that the program's termination would cause both personal hardship and a negatively impact for service members in combat.

=== Labor ===
In June 2018, Booker was one of eight senators to sponsor a bill amending the Fair Labor Standards Act of 1938 to include a mandate forcing farmers to pay workers time and a half for each hour worked past the standard 40-hour work week.

In July 2019, Booker signed a letter to Secretary of Labor Alexander Acosta that advocated for the U.S. Occupational Safety and Health Administration to initiate a full investigation into a complaint filed on May 20 by a group of Chicago-area employees of McDonald's, which detailed workplace violence incidents that included interactions with customers such as customers throwing hot coffee and threatening employees with firearms and more. The senators argued that McDonald's could and needed to "do more to protect its employees, but employers will not take seriously their obligations to provide a safe workplace if OSHA does not enforce workers rights to a hazard-free workplace."

=== LGBTQ rights ===
Booker is a strong, outspoken advocate of same-sex marriage and claimed New Jersey's civil union law was not only bigoted, but also discriminated against New Jersey's same-sex couples who were denied 1,100 federal rights, privileges and benefits afforded to married couples. After Governor Chris Christie vetoed a bill legalizing same-sex marriage in New Jersey and said the issue should be left to a public referendum of the people of New Jersey, Booker criticized him and said that civil rights are guaranteed by the US Constitution and should not be allowed on the ballot. As Newark Mayor, Booker refused to perform any marriage ceremonies until same-sex couples were legally allowed to marry in New Jersey. On October 21, 2013, 12:01 am, the date when same-sex marriage became legal in New Jersey, Booker began performing same-sex and opposite-sex marriages in New Jersey.

In November 2013, Booker cosponsored and voted for the Employment Non-Discrimination Act. In January 2014, he cosponsored the Respect for Marriage Act.

In 2017, Booker termed President Trump's military transgender ban 'deplorable and despicable.' In March 2019, when asked what he would do to protect LGBTQ rights as president, Booker replied, "When I am president of the United States, right away I will end this ridiculous, insulting, un-American ban on transgender Americans serving in the military."

In October 2018, Booker was among 20 senators to sign a letter to Secretary of State Mike Pompeo urging Pompeo to reverse the rolling back of a policy that granted visas to same-sex partners of LGBTQ diplomats who had unions which were not recognized by their home countries, writing that too many places around the world have seen LGBTQ individuals "subjected to discrimination and unspeakable violence, and receive little or no protection from the law or local authorities" and that the US refusing to let LGBTQ diplomats bring their partners to the US would be equivalent of America upholding "the discriminatory policies of many countries around the world."

In June 2019, Booker was among 18 senators to sign a letter to Secretary of State Pompeo requesting an explanation of a decision by the State Department to not issue an official statement that year commemorating Pride Month nor issue the annual cable outlining activities for embassies commemorating Pride Month. They also questioned why the LGBTI special envoy position had remained vacant and asserted that "preventing the official flying of rainbow flags and limiting public messages celebrating Pride Month signals to the international community that the United States is abandoning the advancement of LGBTI rights as a foreign policy priority."

=== Maternal mortality ===
In May 2019, Booker and Representative Ayanna Pressley introduced the Healthy MOMMIES Act, a bill that would expand Medicaid coverage in an attempt to provide comprehensive prenatal, labor and postpartum care with an extension of the Medicaid pregnancy pathway from 60 days to a full year following birth for the purpose of assuring new mothers have access to services unrelated to pregnancy. The bill also directed Medicaid and the Children's Health Insurance Program's Payment and Access Commission report its data regarding doula care coverage under state Medicaid programs and subsequently develop strategies aimed at improving access to doula care.

=== Minimum wage ===
Booker supports an increase of the federal minimum wage to $15 an hour. Speaking to Newark airport workers in May 2017 he said, "It is un-American to be in this country, to work a full-time job and still live in poverty. That is unacceptable. The minimum wage working at a lot of these contract companies only affords them about $22,000 a year ... You cannot live and raise a family on $22,000 a year. You can't afford housing, you can't afford child care and since your company isn't helping you with retirement, you can't save for retirement."

=== Mueller Report ===
In April 2019, Booker was one of 12 Democratic senators to sign a letter led by Mazie Hirono that questioned the decision of Attorney General William Barr to offer "his own conclusion that the President’s conduct did not amount to obstruction of justice" and called for both the Justice Department's inspector general and the Office of Professional Responsibility to launch an investigation into whether Barr's summary of the Mueller Report and his April 18 news conference were misleading.

=== Net neutrality ===
In May 2014, days before the FCC was scheduled to rewrite its net neutrality rules, Booker was one of 11 senators to sign a letter to FCC Chairman Tom Wheeler charging Wheeler's proposal with destroying net neutrality instead of preserving it and urged the FCC to "consider reclassifying Internet providers to make them more like traditional phone companies, over which the agency has clear authority to regulate more broadly."

In March 2018, Booker was one of 10 senators to sign a letter spearheaded by Jeff Merkley lambasting a proposal from FCC Chairman Ajit Pai that would curb the scope of benefits from the Lifeline program during a period where roughly 6.5 million people in poor communities relied on Lifeline to receive access to high-speed internet, citing that it was Pai's "obligation to the American public, as the Chairman of the Federal Communications Commission, to improve the Lifeline program and ensure that more Americans can afford access, and have means of access, to broadband and phone service." The senators also advocated for insuring "Lifeline reaches more Americans in need of access to communication services."

In May 2018, Booker voted for a bill that would reinstate net neutrality rules and thereby overturn the FCC's repeal via a law authorizing Congress to reverse regulatory actions by a simple majority vote.

=== Oceans ===
In June 2019, Booker was one of eight senators to cosponsor the bipartisan Save Our Seas 2.0 Act, a bill unveiled by Dan Sullivan and Bob Menendez intended to spur innovation along with aiding in the reduction plastic waste's creation and both find ways to use already existing plastic waste to stop it from entering the oceans and address this problem on a global scale. The bill was meant to respond to the plastic pollution crisis threatening oceans, shorelines, marine life, and coastal economies and served as a continuation of the Save Our Seas Act.

=== Opioids ===
In February 2017, Booker and 30 other senators signed a letter to Kaléo Pharmaceuticals in response to the opioid-overdose-reversing device Evzio rising in price from $690 in 2014 to $4,500 and requested the company answer what the detailed price structure for Evzio was, the number of devices Kaléo Pharmaceuticals set aside for donation, and the totality of federal reimbursements Evzio received in the previous year.

In March 2017, Booker was one of 21 senators to sign a letter led by Ed Markey to Senate Majority Leader Mitch McConnell which noted that 12 percent of adult Medicaid beneficiaries had some form or a substance abuse disorder in addition to one third of treatment administered for opioid and other substance use disorders in the United States being financed through Medicaid and opined that the American Health Care Act could "very literally translate into a death spiral for those with opioid use disorders" due to the insurance coverage lacking and not having the adequate funds to afford care oftentimes resulting in individuals abandoning substance use disorder treatment.

=== Reparations ===
Booker submitted a bill in The Senate to "study" reparations but has not actively pushed for any implementation of reparations for slavery beyond a study.

=== Social security ===
While running for Senate, Booker said he opposed raising the retirement age for social security except for people in their 20s or younger. Booker later tweeted that he opposed all cuts to Social Security and would expand the program.

=== Taxes ===
As Mayor of Newark, New Jersey, Booker raised taxes by 20 percent but now seeks to cut municipal taxes. He supports taxes on carbon emissions, lowering corporate taxes, and tax incentives. He endorsed Governor Chris Christie's property tax agenda.

=== Technology ===
On April 10, 2019, Booker, fellow Senator Ron Wyden and Representative Yvette Clarke introduced the Algorithmic Accountability Act of 2019, a bill that would grant additional powers to the U.S. Federal Trade Commission (FTC) in addition to forcing companies to study whether race, gender or other biases influence their technology.

In May 2019 during a TV interview, Booker disagreed with Elizabeth Warren's call to break up big tech companies and said, "I don't think that a president should be running around, pointing at companies and saying breaking them up without any kind of process here... we do not need a president that is going to use their own personal beliefs and tell you which companies we should break up. We need a president that's going to enforce antitrust laws..."

=== Transportation ===
In March 2019, Booker, Elizabeth Warren, and Ted Deutch signed a letter to the head of Prisoner Transportation Services of America (PTS) that noted the organization had a moral obligation to avoid individuals being harmed in custody and cited that at least "5 individuals have died while in PTS custody since 2012". The members of Congress expressed that a "desire to slash costs in order to increase profit margins may create perverse incentives for your company to jeopardize the health and safety of your employees and the prisoners in your care."

=== War on drugs ===
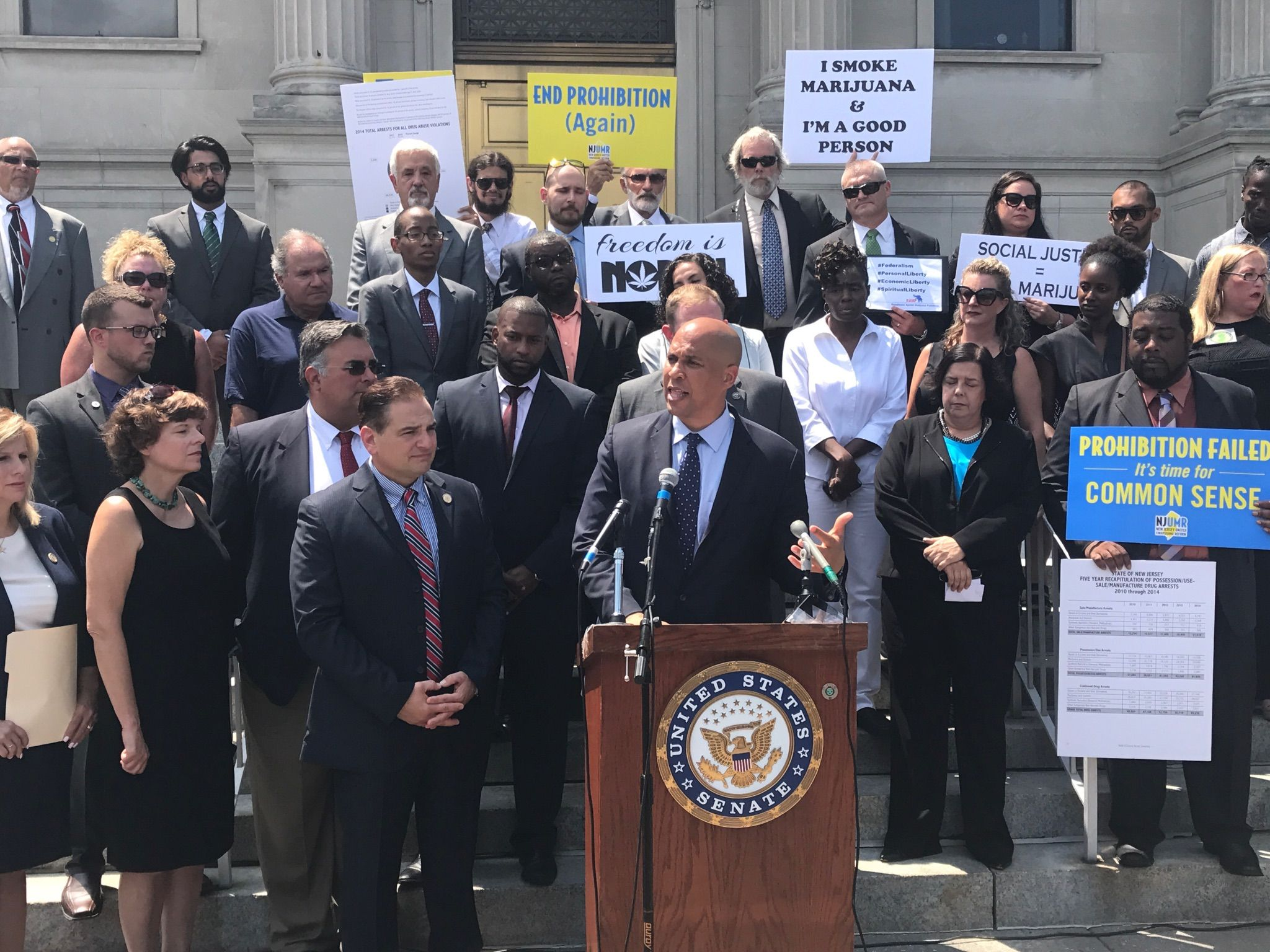
Booker at a rally in support of a bill he filed to legalize cannabis, the Marijuana Justice Act, in 2017

Booker has condemned the war on drugs, calling it a "tremendous failure," and criticizing the Obama administration for not honoring state drug laws. He has also expressed support for medical marijuana research, legalizing cannabis, ending mandatory minimum sentences for non-violent drug offenders, increasing funding for prisoner re-entry programs, and bringing an end to for-profit, private prisons. Booker has also cosponsored the bipartisan STATES Act proposed in the 115th U.S. Congress by Elizabeth Warren and Cory Gardner that would exempt individuals or corporations in compliance with state cannabis laws from federal enforcement of the Controlled Substances Act.

=== Workplace harassment ===
In April 2019, Booker signed onto the Be HEARD Act, legislation intended to abolish the tipped minimum wage along with ending mandatory arbitration and pre-employment nondisclosure agreements. The bill also gave workers additional time to report harassment and was said by cosponsor Patty Murray to come at a time when too many workers are "still silenced by mandatory disclosure agreements that prevent them from discussing sexual harassment and longstanding practices like the tipped wages that keep workers in certain industries especially vulnerable." In May 2021, Booker and Bob Menendez recommended Christine O'Hearne and Karen Williams, who had spent the majority of their careers defending employers against sexual harassment and discrimination claims, to federal judgeships.

== Foreign policy ==
=== Afghanistan ===
According to Booker's campaign website, he supports scaling down U.S. Armed Forces in Afghanistan in a responsible and safe manner. On June 19, 2019, Booker said: "We need to bring our American troops home. We cannot have forever wars in this nation".

=== Central America ===
In April 2019, Booker was among 34 senators to sign a letter to President Donald Trump encouraging him "to listen to members of your own Administration and reverse a decision that will damage our national security and aggravate conditions inside Central America", asserting that President Trump had "consistently expressed a flawed understanding of U.S. foreign assistance" since becoming president and that he was "personally undermining efforts to promote U.S. national security and economic prosperity" through preventing the use of Fiscal Year 2018 national security funding. The senators argued that foreign assistance to Central American countries created less migration to the U.S., citing the funding's helping to improve conditions in those countries.

=== China ===
On May 12, 2019, Booker said: "The Chinese have been taking advantage of this country and other nations on the planet Earth. They do not fight fair. They steal our intellectual property. They force the transfer of technology. ... They unfairly subsidize industries to undercut the market for other countries."

=== Iran ===
According to Booker's campaign website, Iran poses a threat to American and Israeli security. He wants all options, including military action, that prevents Iran from gaining nuclear weapons. In December 2013, Booker was one of the original cosponsors of Bob Menéndez's Nuclear Weapon Free Iran Act of 2013, which would toughen sanctions against Iran.

Booker's decision to back the Iran nuclear deal framework, damaged his long-term relationship with some Jewish supporters. Booker initiated an emergency summit for Jewish leaders in attempt to reduce the damage, but some of his long standing supporters did not attend.

In July 2017, Booker voted in favor of the Countering America's Adversaries Through Sanctions Act that grouped together sanctions against Iran, Russia and North Korea. In 2019, Booker criticized Trump's administration for escalating tensions with Iran. Booker's spokesperson said it would be illegal for the Trump administration to rely on a 2001 law that authorized the use of U.S. Armed Forces against those responsible for the September 11 attacks and any "associated forces".

Booker was the lead sponsor of a March 2026 war powers resolution to halt Trump's strikes on Iran. In his remarks on the Senate floor, he noted the US was spending over a million dollars a day on the war and said "we are seeing the skyrocketing costs of basic goods, the skyrocketing costs of energy and the skyrocketing costs we’re seeing at the pumps at our gas stations." The resolution was defeated 47 to 53. In an interview with Iran International, Booker expressed sympathy for Iranians, saying the US needed to find "a way for the Iranian people to be free from a regime that is doing horrific things to its own people" and credited the war with adding to their suffering. In June, Booker opposed the proposed deal between the US and Iran, calling it a capitulation where Iran received all the benefits and "an abject surrender." During his debate with Justin Murphy in October, Booker said, "This is going to go down in history as one of the most colossally stupid things the president has ever done. He invaded Iran, and now he is stuck in another Middle East quagmire costing us all."

=== Israel ===
Booker has described himself as "a supporter of Israel well before I was in the United States Senate". He has quoted the Bible (Psalm 137:5): 'If I forget thee, O Israel, may I cut off my right hand'. According to Booker's campaign website, he is a strong advocate for the state of Israel and supports a two state solution to the Israeli–Palestinian conflict. However he stated certain conditions must remain non-negotiable, such as Israel's right to exist as a secure Jewish state free from terrorism. Booker cosponsored a bill that would prohibit U.S. companies from joining the movement for boycott, divestment, and sanctions against Israel.

In 2019 he told an American Israel Public Affairs Committee (AIPAC) audience that "We need leadership in both parties that is about uniting Americans around a common cause. And what greater tradition has there been in America, going back to the founding of Israel that we have common cause with the state of Israel. We have a common cause, and they are our allies". He has received approximately $800,000 from AIPAC, and has claimed that he had been attending AIPAC conferences "well before I knew that one day I would be [a Senator]". In 2019 Booker said that he and the president of AIPAC "talk often" and "text message back and forth like teenagers".

Booker supported a resolution celebrating the 50th anniversary of the Israeli annexation of East Jerusalem.

In February 2019, Booker voted against pro-Israel Anti-Boycott Act, which would make it illegal for U.S. companies to engage in boycotts against Israel and Israeli settlements in the West Bank.

On April 3, 2025, two days after his marathon speech on the Senate floor, Booker voted against a Bernie Sanders-backed legislation which would have cancelled $8.8 billion in new arms sales to Israel during its war on Gaza. Booker has consistently voted in favor of arms sales to Israel.

=== Russia ===
In February 2017, Booker was one of 11 senators to sign a letter to U.S. Attorney General Jeff Sessions expressing their concern "about credible allegations that the Trump campaign, transition team, and Administration has colluded with the Russian government, including most recently the events leading to the resignation of Lieutenant General Michael Flynn as National Security Adviser." The senators requested the creation of "an independent Special Counsel to investigate collusion with the Russian government by General Flynn and other Trump campaign, transition and Administrative officials" in order to maintain "the confidence, credibility and impartiality of the Department of Justice".

=== Saudi Arabia ===
In June 2017, Booker voted for a resolution by Rand Paul and Chris Murphy that would block President Trump's $510 million sale of precision-guided munitions to Saudi Arabia that made up a portion of the $110 billion arms sale Trump announced during his visit to Saudi Arabia the previous year.

In March 2018, Booker voted against tabling a resolution spearheaded by Bernie Sanders, Chris Murphy, and Mike Lee that would have required President Trump to withdraw American troops either in or influencing Yemen within the next 30 days unless they were combating Al-Qaeda.

=== Syria ===
In August 2013, during a HuffPost interview, Booker stated that he opposed military intervention in Syria. However, a few days later he said, "As part of the process of working with Congress, I expect that the president will clearly delineate what the strategic objectives are, and what limited military action will specifically achieve in Syria ..." and: "Obviously, there needs to be a response, but the question is what is it, and is it going to be perfectly attenuated to the outcomes we want." During a September 2013 debate between him and Steve Lonegan, Booker stated he did not have sufficient information to say whether or not he would vote aye or nay on the resolution before the Congress at the time.

=== Armenia–Azerbaijan War ===
Booker accused Turkey of inciting the conflict between Armenia and Azerbaijan over the disputed region of Nagorno-Karabakh and called for the Trump administration to immediately suspend U.S. military aid to Azerbaijan, sent through Pentagon’s "building partner assistance program." According to critics, the aid could be used in the Nagorno-Karabakh conflict. He co-signed a letter that read: "If Turkey is unwilling to step back from active engagement in the conflict, then the State Department should immediately suspend all sales and transfers of military equipment to Ankara."
