= Michael Ware (disambiguation) =

Michael Ware (born 1969) is an Australian journalist.

Michael Ware may also refer to:

- Mike Ware (photographer) (born 1939), English photographer known for work on alternative processes
- Mike Ware (ice hockey) (born 1967), Canadian ice hockey player
- Hannibal Ware goes by "Mike" Ware
