= PhIO =

PhIO may refer to:

- Iodosobenzene
- Public Health Informatics Office of the US Center for Surveillance, Epidemiology and Laboratory Services
