= Small Business Act (United States) =

1953 Congressional Act establishing the Small Business Administration

Small Business Act of 1953
- Long title: An Act to create the Small Business Administration and to preserve small business institutions and free, competitive enterprise
- Enacted by: the 83rd United States Congress

Citations
- Public law: Pub. L. 83–163

Legislative history
- Introduced in the House; Signed into law by President Dwight D. Eisenhower on July 30, 1953

The Small Business Act is the Act of Congress which created the Small Business Administration. It was enacted July 30, 1953, originally as the Small Business Act of 1953 as Title II of Pub. L. 83–163 (ch. 282, 67 Stat. 232. It was codified at 15 U.S.C. ch. 14A.

The Reconstruction Finance Corporation Liquidation Act, which was Title I of Pub. L. 83–163, abolished the Reconstruction Finance Corporation.

== Amendments ==
The Small Business Act Amendments of 1958 (Pub. L. 85–536, 72 Stat. 384, enacted July 18, 1958) withdrew Title II as part of that act and made it a separate act to be known as the "Small Business Act". Its function was and is to "aid, counsel, assist and protect, insofar as is possible, the interests of small business concerns".

It was amended in 1978 (Pub. L. 95–507) resulting in contracting requirements that resulted in the establishment of Office of Small and Disadvantaged Business Utilizations.

It was amended again in 1988 with Public Law 100-646 requiring projections for procurement planning.

It was amended again in 2017 by the Improving Contract Procurement for Small Businesses through More Accurate Reporting Act of 2017 (incorporated within the National Defense Authorization Act for Fiscal Year 2018, signed by the President on 12 December 2017), and in 2020 by the Paycheck Protection Program Flexibility Act of 2020 (Pub. L. 116–142 (text) (PDF)), which loosened the requirements for loan forgiveness.
