= Margaret Tolbert =

American chemist

- Born: November 24, 1943; Suffolk
- Alma mater: Tuskegee University; Wayne State University; Brown University
- Occupation: Chemist; university teacher
- Employer: BP; New Brunswick Laboratory (1996–2002); Tuskegee University
- Awards: Fellow of the American Association for the Advancement of Science (1998)

Margaret Ellen Mayo Tolbert (born November 24, 1943) is a biochemist who worked as a professor and director of the Carver Research Foundation at Tuskegee University, and was an administrative chemist at British Petroleum. From 1996 to 2002 she served as director of the New Brunswick Laboratory, becoming the first African American and the first woman in charge of a Department of Energy lab.

== Early life and education ==
Margaret Ellen Mayo was born in Suffolk, Virginia, to Jessie Clifford "Clifton" and Martha Taylor Artis Mayo. Her mother died when she was quite young, and her father a few years later. She and her siblings were raised for several years by her grandmother Fannie Mae Johnson Mayo, and after her grandmother became ill, by the older sister, Audrey Mae. Margaret and her five siblings were kept together in spite of financial difficulties. The city was strongly segregated, with different areas at the beach and different entrances and drinking fountains in stores and movie theaters.

Margaret Mayo attended Ida V. Easter Graded School, and then East Suffolk Junior High. She walked two miles to reach junior high school and was still the top in her class. Her hard work continued through high school. She worked as a maid to help her family while she took advanced placement classes. A well-off African-American couple for whom she worked, Mrs. and Mrs. S. A. Cook, were supportive, sponsoring her as a debutante and encouraging her to attend university. She graduated from East Suffolk High School in 1963 at the top of her class of 99 students, and was its valedictorian.

== University education ==
Margaret enrolled in the Tuskegee Institute, an action enabled primarily by the availability of financial aid. The Cooks drove her to Alabama, and introduced her to friends at Tuskegee, the Howells. At the time Tuskegee was actively involved in the civil rights movement. At Tuskegee University, Margaret enrolled in chemistry with a minor in mathematics. Margaret was a student research assistant under the mentorship of C. J. Smith and L. F. Koons of the Tuskegee Institute Department of Chemistry. She also participated in summer research at Central State College in Durham, North Carolina, and at Argonne National Laboratory (ANL). As an assistant at Tuskegee, she studied the conductivity and electrical resistance of different chemicals in water solutions. At ANL, she studied the electrical resistance and chemical combinations of uranium. She graduated from Tuskegee in 1967 with a B.S. degree. She also married briefly and had a son.

She earned her Master of Science degree in analytical chemistry from Wayne State University in 1968, and returned briefly to Tuskegee, where she supervised chemistry projects and taught mathematics (1969–1970). She was then recruited to Brown University where she defended her thesis in 1973 and received her doctorate degree in biochemistry in 1974. Her research involved signal transduction in rat liver cells. Her research advisor at Brown was John Nicholas Fain of the Division of Medical Sciences. While at Brown she married her second husband, Henry Hudson Tolbert.

The research conducted by Margaret while she was a student at Brown University was "... among the first studies in signal transduction to point out that there are rapid effects of ligands that did not involve RNA or protein synthesis and occur by some intracellular messenger other than cyclic AMP" according to Fain. She also taught science and mathematics at the Opportunities Industrialization Center in Providence, Rhode Island, while completing her graduate studies.

== Further career ==
After earning her doctorate degree, she returned to Tuskegee as a faculty member and researcher in the chemistry department, continuing her rat liver research (1973–1976). She taught at Florida A&M University for two years (1977–1979) and was an associate dean there before accepting a short-term visiting research position at the International Institute of Cellular and Molecular Pathology (ICP) in Brussels, Belgium in 1979. This position was made possible by a grant from the National Institute of General Medical Sciences. She then accepted a short-term visiting research position at Brown University, again working on the biochemistry of the liver.

In 1979, Tolbert returned to Tuskegee as the first female director of The Carver Research Foundation of Tuskegee University and as provost of the university, holding these positions for eight years. She also continued to research the effects of drugs on the human liver.

Other institutions at which she has conducted research include: Lawrence Livermore National Laboratory (Biomedical Institute, Summer 1974), University of Texas Medical School at Houston (Department of Neurobiology and Anatomy; Department of Pharmacology; Summer 1977), and the NARACOM/ARIEM (Army Research Institute of Environmental Medicine) in Natick, MA (between 1980 and 1985).

In 1987, Tolbert joined the research department of British Petroleum. She was involved as a corporate planner in the merger of BP and Standard Oil of Ohio. Between 1990 and 1993, she was In 1994, she worked briefly as a consultant for the Howard Hughes Medical Institute developing international research programs.

Tolbert then accepted the position of division director at the Argonne National Laboratory. In 1996 she resigned to become director of the New Brunswick Laboratory. She was the first African American and the first woman in charge of a Department of Energy lab. She was director of the New Brunswick Laboratory from 1996 to 2002. She served on Presidential Committees on Education and Technology. As director of the New Brunswick Laboratory, she was involved in projects to prevent the spread of nuclear materials and weapons technology, the preparation of nuclear reference materials for the standardization of instruments, assessment of worldwide measurement capabilities at nuclear laboratories, and measurement of nuclear material from worldwide samples.

As of September 22, 2002, Tolbert became Senior Advisor to the Office of Integrative Activities (OIA), promoting activities at the National Science Foundation (NSF) that increase the participation of underrepresented groups (women, minorities, and people with disabilities) in science and engineering. She has acted as Executive Secretary and NSF Executive Liaison to the Committee on Equal Opportunity in Science and Engineering. She retired from the NSF in December 2011.

== Honors ==
Tolbert has received a number of awards and honors. In 1998, Tolbert was elected as a member of the American Association for the Advancement of Science (AAAS). She is also a member of the American Association of University Women (AAUW), the American Chemical Society (ACS), and the Organization of Black Scientists.

== Autobiography ==
In 2015, she published an autobiography, Resilience in the Face of Adversity: A Suffolkian’s Life Story (Balboa Press, 2015).
