= List of defunct or renamed United States federal agencies =

- Agricultural Stabilization and Conservation Service (ASCS), replaced in 1994 with the Farm Service Agency
- Agricultural Adjustment Administration (AAA)
  Formed 1933. Abolished 1942.
- Board of Economic Warfare (BEW)
  Formed 1940. Replaced in 1943 with the Office of Economic Warfare
- Board of Tea Appeals
  Abolished in 1996
- Bureau of Arms Control, replaced September 13, 2005, by the Bureau of International Security and Nonproliferation
- Bureau of Nonproliferation, replaced September 13, 2005, by the Bureau of International Security and Nonproliferation
- Bureau of Verification and Compliance, replaced February 1, 2000 by the Bureau of Verification, Compliance, and Implementation
- Civil Aeronautics Board
  Formed 1938. Abolished 1985.
- Department of Commerce and Labor
  Formed 1903. Split in 1913 into Department of Commerce and Department of Labor.
- Committee on Public Information (CPI)
- Department of War existed from August 7, 1789, until September 18, 1947, when it became part of the Department of Defense.
- Environmental Science Services Administration
  Formed 1965. Abolished 1970. Components merged with those of other agencies to form the National Oceanic and Atmospheric Administration.
- Farmers Home Administration
  Replaced in 1994 with the Farm Service Agency.
- Farm Security Administration (FSA)
- Federal Housing Finance Board (FHFB), merged into the Federal Housing Finance Agency in 2008
- Federal National Mortgage Association (FNMA or Fannie Mae), partially privatized in 1968; its government administered portion was renamed the Government National Mortgage Association (Ginnie Mae)
- Health Care Financing Administration (HCFA), renamed Centers for Medicare and Medicaid Services
- Student Loan Marketing Association (SLMA or Sallie Mae)
  Sallie Mae has been fully privatized and is no longer administered by the federal government.
- Foreign Economic Administration (FEA)
- Federal Theatre Project (FTP)
- General Accounting Office (GAO), renamed Government Accountability Office in 2004
- Department of Health, Education, and Welfare
  Formed in 1953. Split in 1979 into Department of Education and Department of Health and Human Services.
- Interstate Commerce Commission (ICC)
- Immigration and Naturalization Service (INS)
  Now the United States Citizenship and Immigration Service (USCIS)
- National Advisory Committee for Aeronautics (NACA)
- National Bureau of Standards
  Formed 1901. Renamed National Institute of Standards and Technology in 1988.
- National Ocean Survey
  Formed 1970. Renamed National Ocean Service in 1983.
- Office of the Coordinator of Inter-American Affairs (OCIAA)
- Office of Civil Defense
  renamed the Defense Civil Preparedness Agency on May 5, 1972, and was abolished on July 20, 1979.
- Office of Technology Assessment (OTA)
  Congress closed the OTA in 2004.
- Office of War Information (OWI)
- Reconstruction Finance Corporation (RFC)
- Resettlement Administration (RA)
  Turned into Farm Security Administration in 1937.
- Survey of the Coast
  Formed 1807. Renamed United States Coast Survey in 1836 and United States Coast and Geodetic Survey in 1878.
- United States Coast Survey
  Renamed United States Coast and Geodetic Survey in 1878.
- United States Assay Commission
  Formed in 1792 and abolished in 1980. Intended to assess the weight and fineness of gold and silver coins, it was deemed an unnecessary taxpayer expense with the end of silver coinage in 1972.
- United States Coast and Geodetic Survey
  Abolished 1970 and components merged into new National Oceanic and Atmospheric Administration (NOAA). Components assigned to NOAA's National Ocean Survey, Office of Coast Survey, U.S. National Geodetic Survey, and fleet
- United States Army Security Agency
  In 1977, the ASA was merged with the US Army's Military Intelligence component to create the United States Army Intelligence and Security Command (INSCOM).
- United States Bureau of Fisheries
  Abolished 1940. Components merged with those of other agencies to form the Fish and Wildlife Service, which became the United States Fish and Wildlife Service in 1956.
- United States Digital Service, replaced by the Department of Government Efficiency in 2025
- United States Fish Commission
  Officially United States Commission of Fish and Fisheries. Formed 1871, became United States Bureau of Fisheries in 1903.
- United States Information Agency (USIA)
- United States Life-Saving Service
  Merged with the United States Revenue Cutter Service in 1915 to create the United States Coast Guard
- United States Lighthouse Service
  Merged into the United States Coast Guard in 1939
- United States Revenue Cutter Service
  Merged with the United States Life-Saving Service in 1915 to create the United States Coast Guard
- United States Revenue-Marine
  Renamed United States Revenue Cutter Service in 1894
- Veterans Administration (VA), became a cabinet department in 1988
- War Production Board (WPB)
  Formed 1942. Abolished 1945.
- Works Progress Administration (WPA)
  Formed 1935. Abolished 1943.

== See also ==
- List of United States federal agencies
