= Committee for the Implementation of Textile Agreements =

The Committee for the Implementation of Textile Agreements is the United States federal committee "responsible matters affecting textile trade policy and for supervising the implementation of all textile trade agreements."

== History ==
In 2005 the Committee solicited comments on limiting the import of cotton bras from China.
