= Hannibal Ware =

American government official

Mike Ware
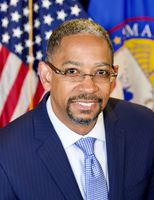

Inspector General of the Small Business Administration
- In office January 9, 2017 – January 24, 2025; Acting: January 9, 2017 – May 24, 2018
- President: Barack Obama; Donald Trump; Joe Biden; Donald Trump
- Preceded by: Peg Gustafson

Personal details
- Born: Hannibal Michael Ware Saint Thomas, U.S. Virgin Islands
- Education: University of the Virgin Islands (BA)

Hannibal "Mike" Ware was the inspector general of the United States Small Business Administration. Ware was sworn into office on May 24, 2018 and served until January 24, 2025.

== Early life ==
Ware is originally from the U.S. Virgin Islands, and he grew up on St. Croix. He graduated from Central High School. He earned a Bachelor of Arts degree in accounting from the University of the Virgin Islands. He also is a graduate of the Senior Executive Service Career Development Program. He has received numerous awards and honors throughout his career. He was conferred a degree of Doctorate of Human Letters by the University of the Virgin Islands in December 2020.

== Career ==
As a junior in college, Ware began working as an intern auditor for the Office of the Inspector General of the U.S. Department of the Interior in 1990. He continued working there after graduation. He was later promoted to supervisor of the office.

In 2009, Gov. John de Jongh Jr. used $490,000 of government funds to build a perimeter fence, expand his driveway, build a guard house, and installed a security camera system. Ware found that de Jongh had used money designated for repairs to public roads to make the improvements to his private home, which was improper and circumvented the legislature. The attorney general charged DeJongh with criminal embezzlement of public funds and neglecting to pay over public monies.

Ware was later promoted to Eastern Regional Manager. While he was Deputy Assistant Inspector General for Management, Ware managed the office's operating budget and logistics.

Ware served as the Deputy Inspector General of the Small Business Administration from April 2016 to January 2017. When Inspector General Peggy E. Gustafson left the position to become to Inspector General of the Department of Commerce, Ware served as the Acting Inspector General from January 9, 2017, until President Donald Trump appointed him, the Senate confirmed him, and he was sworn into office on May 24, 2018. He is responsible for independent oversight of SBA’s programs and operations, which normally encompass more than $100 billion in guaranteed loans and nearly $100 billion in Federal contracting dollars. As a result of SBA’s role in the nation’s pandemic response, he is providing oversight of over a trillion dollars of lending authority aimed at stabilizing the nation’s economy and providing vital capital to the nation’s small businesses. He also is a statutory member of the Council of the Inspectors General on Integrity and Efficiency’s (CIGIE) Pandemic Response Accountability Committee (PRAC), serving alongside his Inspector General colleagues to provide a whole of Government response to the pandemic oversight effort. Within the PRAC, Inspector General Ware chairs the Subcommittee on Audits. In addition, Inspector General Ware serves as the Chair of the Audit Committee for CIGIE and is a member of CIGIE’s Executive Council.

In 2017, Ware helped uncover several contractors that had received federal contracts intended for service-disabled veteran-owned small businesses under false pretenses. One company attempted to qualify by hiring a disabled veteran to officially serve in that role as a figurehead while not actually controlling the company at all.

In May 2020, Ware criticized the Small Business Administration's rules for the Paycheck Protection Program, saying that the Small Business Administration had set stricter rules than Congress wrote into the law created the program, which is causing an "unintended burden" on businesses. Ware also said that the Small Business Administration's failure to provide guidance to financial institutions to prioritize businesses in underserved and rural markets, resulting in fewer loans to their businesses than the law intended.

In November 2024, Ware was elected chair of the Council of the Inspectors General on Integrity and Efficiency (CIGIE), effective Jan. 1, 2025; he succeeded Mark Greenblatt.

On January 24, 2025 President Donald Trump attempted to dismiss Mr. Ware along with several other inspectors general. Ware responded that he had not been legally dismissed, as the law required a notification to Congress 30 days in advance. On February 12, he and seven other inspectors general who were fired by Trump filed a lawsuit against the administration, asking that their dismissals be ruled illegal and that they be reinstated.

On September 15, 2025, Ware was announced as the next director of the Virgin Islands Waste Management Authority.

Government offices
Preceded by Peg Gustafson	Inspector General of the Small Business Administration; 2018–present	Incumbent
