= Phyllis Fong =

American attorney

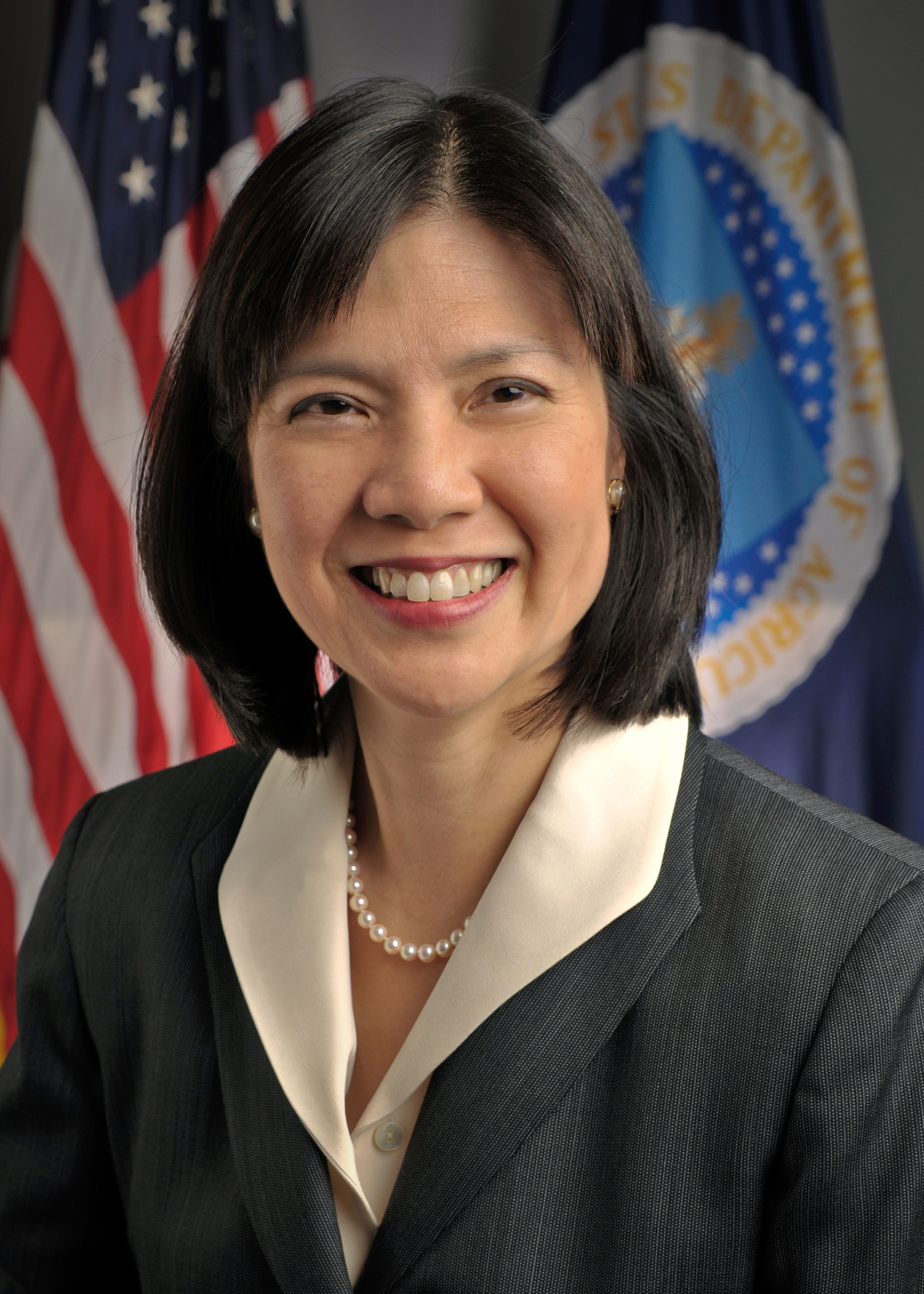

Inspector General of the United States Department of Agriculture
- In office December 2, 2002 – January 24, 2025
- President: George W. Bush; Barack Obama; Donald Trump; Joe Biden; Donald Trump
- Preceded by: Joyce Fleischman (Acting)
- Succeeded by: John Walk

Inspector General of the Small Business Administration
- In office April 6, 1999 – December 2, 2002
- President: Bill Clinton
- Preceded by: Karen Lee (Acting)
- Succeeded by: Peter McClintock (Acting)

Personal details
- Born: Philadelphia, Pennsylvania, U.S.
- Spouse: Paul Tellier
- Children: 2
- Education: Pomona College (BA); Vanderbilt University (JD)

Phyllis Fong is an American attorney who served as the inspector general of the United States Department of Agriculture from 2002 until her removal in 2025. Fong was nominated to the position in 2002 by President George W. Bush. She was removed from her position in 2025 by the Trump administration.

== Early life and education ==
Fong was born in Philadelphia and raised in Honolulu. She earned a Bachelor of Arts degree in Asian studies from Pomona College and Juris Doctor from the Vanderbilt University Law School.

== Career ==
Fong began her career as a staff attorney for the United States Commission on Civil Rights. She then served as assistant general counsel for the Legal Services Corporation and assistant inspector general for management and policy. After serving as assistant inspector general for management and legal counsel, Fong was nominated to serve as inspector general of the Small Business Administration in 1999. Fong was nominated to serve as inspector general of the United States Department of Agriculture in 2002 and was confirmed on December 2, 2002.

In April 2020, Fong was appointed to serve as a member of the Pandemic Response Accountability Committee.

On January 24, 2025, President Donald Trump dismissed Phyllis K. Fong along with several other inspectors general in what was described as a sweeping purge of independent oversight officials. Fong, who had served as the United States Department of Agriculture's Inspector General since 2002, refused to step down, arguing that the Trump administration had not followed proper protocol. She was subsequently escorted out of her office by security personnel.

The White House defended the firings, stating that "these rogue, partisan bureaucrats... have been relieved of their duties in order to make room for qualified individuals who will uphold the rule of law and protect Democracy." The dismissals sparked criticism from oversight advocates and members of Congress, who viewed the move as an attempt to weaken government accountability.

== Personal life ==
Fong and her husband have two children. Her husband is also an attorney.
