= Office of Small and Disadvantaged Business Utilization =

US government offices focused on promoting contracting small businesses

Office of Small and Disadvantaged Business Utilization (OSDBU) is the name of offices within federal and state agencies charged with promoting efforts to do business with small and minority owned businesses. The offices are designed to aid in contracting. The offices exist at the Office of U.S. Secretary of Defense, U.S. Department of Commerce, U.S. Department of Education, U.S. Department of Energy, U.S. Department of Transportation, U.S. Department of State, U.S. Department of the Interior, Social Security Administration, U.S. Department of Justice and the U.S. Department of Veterans Affairs.

== History ==
The offices were created after the passage of Public Law 95–507 in 1978, which amended the Small Business Act of 1953 and addressed contracting. The law was signed by president Jimmy Carter.

The Office of Management and Budget released a policy letter regarding contracting procedures in April 1980, laying out federal contracting requirements as they relate to the law.

The OSDBU at the Office of Secretary of Defense was involved in a bribery scandal that resulted in criminal convictions of two officials leading it in 2002.
