= New Brunswick Laboratory =

US center of excellence

Coordinates: 41.704331°N 87.982002°W

Now the NBL Program Office, the New Brunswick Laboratory (NBL), was a United States government-owned and operated, center of excellence in the measurement science of nuclear materials. It was established in 1949 by the Atomic Energy Commission and was located in New Brunswick, New Jersey. It was relocated between 1975 and 1977 and was located, as a Federal enclave, on the site of Argonne National Laboratory, about 40 kilometers (25 miles) southwest of Chicago, Illinois. NBL was part the Department of Energy's Office of Science Chicago Office.

NBL is the U.S. Government's Nuclear Materials Measurements and Reference Materials Laboratory and the National Certifying Authority for nuclear reference materials and measurement calibration standards. As an internationally recognized Federal laboratory, NBL provides reference materials, measurement and interlaboratory measurement evaluation services, and technical expertise for evaluating measurement methods and safeguards measures in use at other facilities for a variety of Federal program sponsors and customers. NBL functions as a Network Laboratory for the International Atomic Energy Agency (IAEA).

NBL was reorganized into the NBL Program Office in 2016, and its nuclear reference materials were transferred to a new distribution center located near Oak Ridge, Tennessee. It is part of the National Nuclear Security Administration's Office of Defense Programs.

== See also ==
Margaret Tolbert
