= Office of Administration =

U.S. federal organization within the Executive Office of the President

Agency overview
- Formed: December 12, 1977
- Headquarters: Eisenhower Executive Office Building
- Employees: About 225
- Agency executive: Joshua Fisher, Director (Note: The Director of Management & Administration concurrently serves as the Director of the Office of Administration))
- Parent agency: Executive Office of the President of the United States
- Website: Office of Administration

In the United States government, the Office of Administration is an entity within the Executive Office of the President tasked with overseeing the general administration of the entire Executive Office.

== History ==
The Office of Administration was formed by merging the administrative functions of ten entities that were present in the Executive Office by the signing of Executive Order 12028 by President Jimmy Carter on December 12, 1977.

== Mission ==
The organization's mission is to provide administrative services to all entities of the Executive Office of the President, including direct support services to the President of the United States. The services include financial management and information technology support, human resources management, library and research assistance, facilities management, procurement, printing and graphics support, security, and the Office of White House mail and messenger operations. The Director of the organization oversees the submission of the annual budget Request and represents the organization before congressional funding committees.

Part of the Office of Administration is the Facilities Management Division. The core functions include the Facility Request Program, Space Management, Project Oversight, Conference and Meeting Support, Preservation Stewardship, and Recycling Program Management.

As part of the Facilities Management Division, the Preservation Office's mission is the preservation of the historic and architectural integrity of the EOP properties. This involves the following tasks:

- Oversee the restoration and preservation of the Eisenhower Executive Office Building (EEOB), the East and West Wings of the White House, and the Jackson Place Townhouses, among other selected properties.
- Direct and manage public education programs on the history of the EOP properties (these include special presentations, exhibitions, brochures and other informational requests).
- Maintain collections of furnishings, decorative arts, architectural fragments, prints and drawings, and research files, as well as manage the receipt of gifts and the loans of materials and furnishings.

== See also ==
- Office of Management and Budget
- General Services Administration
- Office of Personnel Management
- Secret Service
