= Center for Surveillance, Epidemiology and Laboratory Services =

Branch of the US Centers for Disease Control and Prevention

The Center for Surveillance, Epidemiology and Laboratory Services (CSELS) was a branch of the US Centers for Disease Control and Prevention (CDC) from 2013-2022 that provided scientific service, expertise, skills, and tools in support of national efforts to promote health; prevent disease, injury and disability; and prepare for emerging health threats. It was founded in 2013 and had over 700 employees and contractors before its divisions and office of the director were reorganized.

CSELS managed over 30 programs across four divisions: Division of Health Informatics and Surveillance, Division of Laboratory Systems, Division of Public Health Information Dissemination, and the Division of Scientific Education and Professional Development.

== Division of Health Informatics and Surveillance ==
The Division of Health Informatics and Surveillance (DHIS) provides leadership and expertise in data, surveillance, and analytics for the CDC and partners with state-of-the-art information systems, capacity building services, and high-quality data to guide public health decisions and actions. These include in case surveillance; syndromic surveillance; and data processing, provisioning, and analytics support the CDC Data Modernization Initiative, health equity, and our critical partners in public health surveillance.

== Division of Laboratory Systems ==
The Division of Laboratory Systems ('DLSs) purpose is to improve the quality of laboratory testing and related practices in the U.S. and globally through the development and evaluation of innovative training, technical standards, practice guidelines, and reference materials.

Major Products or Services provided by DLS include:

- CASPIR – The CDC and ATSDR Specimen Packaging, Inventory and Repository (CASPIR), was established as a centralized resource to preserve CDC's valuable specimens and to provide ongoing specimen management support for CDC programs. The biorepository holds over 6.5 million samples.
- CLIAC - Clinical Laboratory Improvement Act Committee

== Division of Public Health Information Dissemination ==
The Public Health Informatics Office (PHIO), formerly the Division of Public Health Information Dissemination is an interdisciplinary team that collaborates across the agency and with private and governmental partners to provide innovative data, analytics, and technology solutions for public health action.

== Division of Scientific Education and Professional Development ==
The Division of Scientific Education and Professional Development (DSEPD) provides leadership for recruiting, training, developing and retaining the nation's public health workforce at all levels of the public health system.
