= U.S. Department of Agriculture, Office of Inspector General =

American government official

U.S. Department of Agriculture - Office of Inspector General
- Seal of the OIG
- Formed: 1978
- Headquarters: Washington, D.C.
- Parent agency: U.S. Department of Agriculture
- Inspector General: John Walk
- Website: www.usda.gov/oig/

The U.S. Department of Agriculture Office of Inspector General (USDA OIG) is one of the Inspector General offices created by the Inspector General Act of 1978. The Inspector General for the Department of Agriculture is charged with investigating and auditing department programs to combat waste, fraud, and abuse. A component of USDA-OIG, the Office of Investigations, conducts criminal investigations led by USDA-OIG Special Agents.

== History of Inspectors General ==
Inspector General	Date started
John Walk	January 5, 2026
Janet M. Sorensen (Acting)	February 23, 2025
Virginia E. Banner Rone (Acting)	January 24, 2025
Phyllis Fong	December 2, 2002
Joyce Fleischman (Acting)	October 3, 2001
Roger C. Viadero	October 14, 1994
Leon Snead	August 1, 1990
Leon Snead (Acting)	December 26, 1988
Robert W. Beuley	August 11, 1986
John V. Graziano	July 31, 1981
Robert E. Magee (Acting)	January 27, 1981
Thomas R. McBride (Note: Appointment via Inspector General Act of 1978, dated October 12, 1978.)	July 24, 1979
Thomas R. McBride (Note: OIG was administratively re-established by Secretary’s Memorandum 1915, dated March 23, 1977.)	October 25, 1977
Nathaniel E. Kossack (Note: OIG abolished by Secretary’s Memorandum 1863, dated January 9, 1974. (That memorandum also established a separate Office of Audit and Office of Investigation.))	May 1969
Lester P. Condon (Note: OIG established administratively by Secretary Orville L. Freeman and announced in July 19, 1962 press release.)	July 19, 1962
