= William Bookless =

American scientist and government official

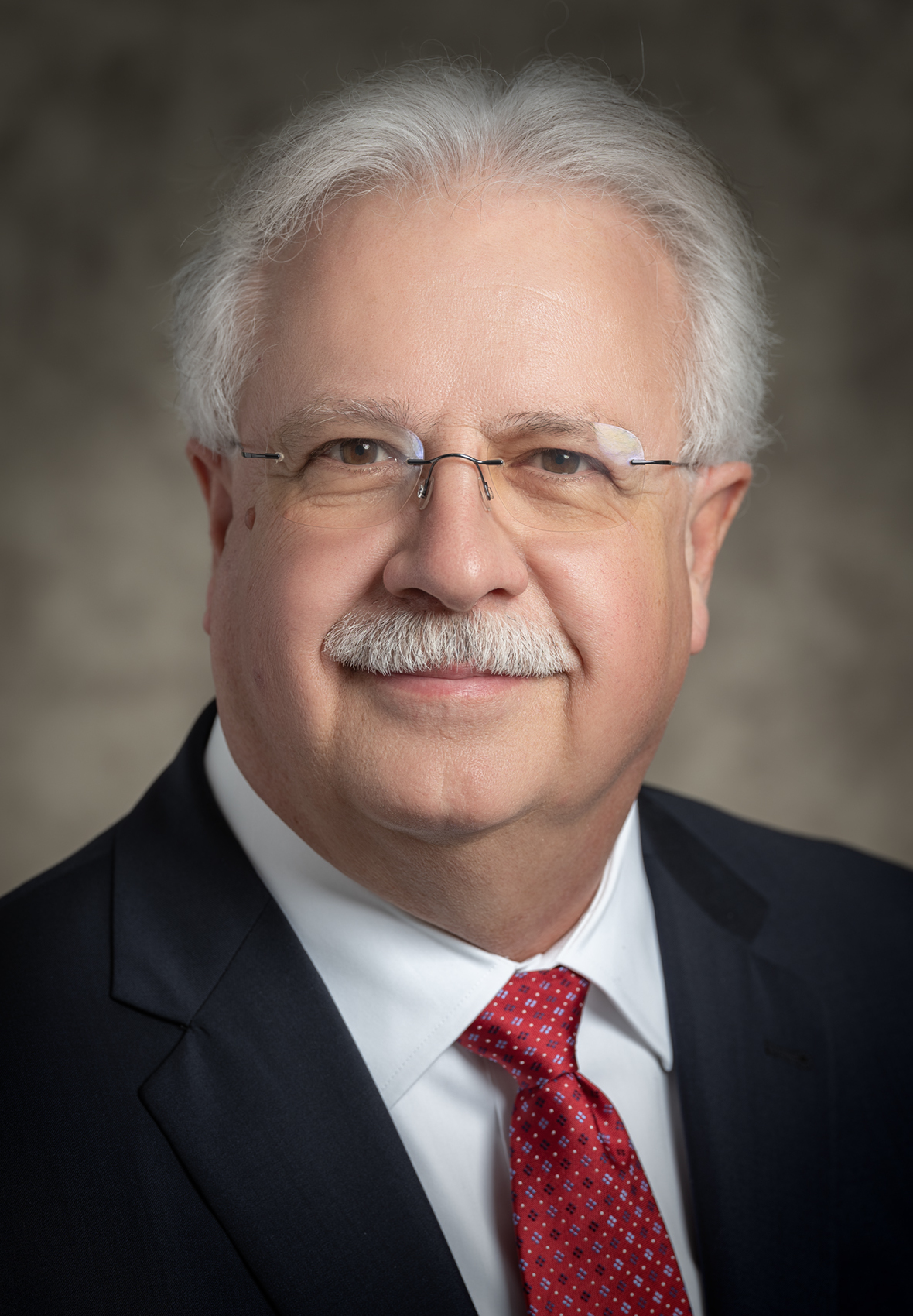

Under Secretary of Energy for Nuclear Security
- Acting
- In office November 6, 2020 – January 20, 2021
- President: Donald Trump
- Preceded by: Lisa Gordon-Hagerty
- Succeeded by: Jill Hruby

Personal details
- Education: Southern Illinois University Carbondale (BA); University of Wyoming (PhD)

William Bookless is an American scientist and government official who served as the acting Under Secretary of Energy for Nuclear Security from 2020 to 2021. Bookless, who had previously served as deputy under secretary, assumed office on November 6, 2020 after the resignation of Lisa Gordon-Hagerty.

== Education ==
Bookless earned a Bachelor of Arts degree in physics from Southern Illinois University Carbondale and a PhD in physics from University of Wyoming.

== Career ==
Bookless worked as a senior physicist at the Lawrence Livermore National Laboratory for 32 years, where he specialized in nuclear security-related issues. At the Livermore National Laboratory, Bookless conducted research into the effects of X-ray lasers. He was also an associate program leader in the laboratory's nuclear design division. He later served as the Deputy Associate Director of Defense and Nuclear Technologies and Associate Director of Safety and Environmental Protection.

For three years, Bookless served as the Assistant Laboratory Director for Policy and Planning at Brookhaven National Laboratory. From 2009 to 2012, he served as a senior policy advisor in the National Nuclear Security Administration. On May 23, 2019, Bookless was confirmed by the United States Senate to serve as principal deputy director of the NNSA. After Director Lisa Gordon-Hagerty resigned on November 6, 2020, Bookless assumed her position in an acting capacity.
