= Linton Brooks =

American government official

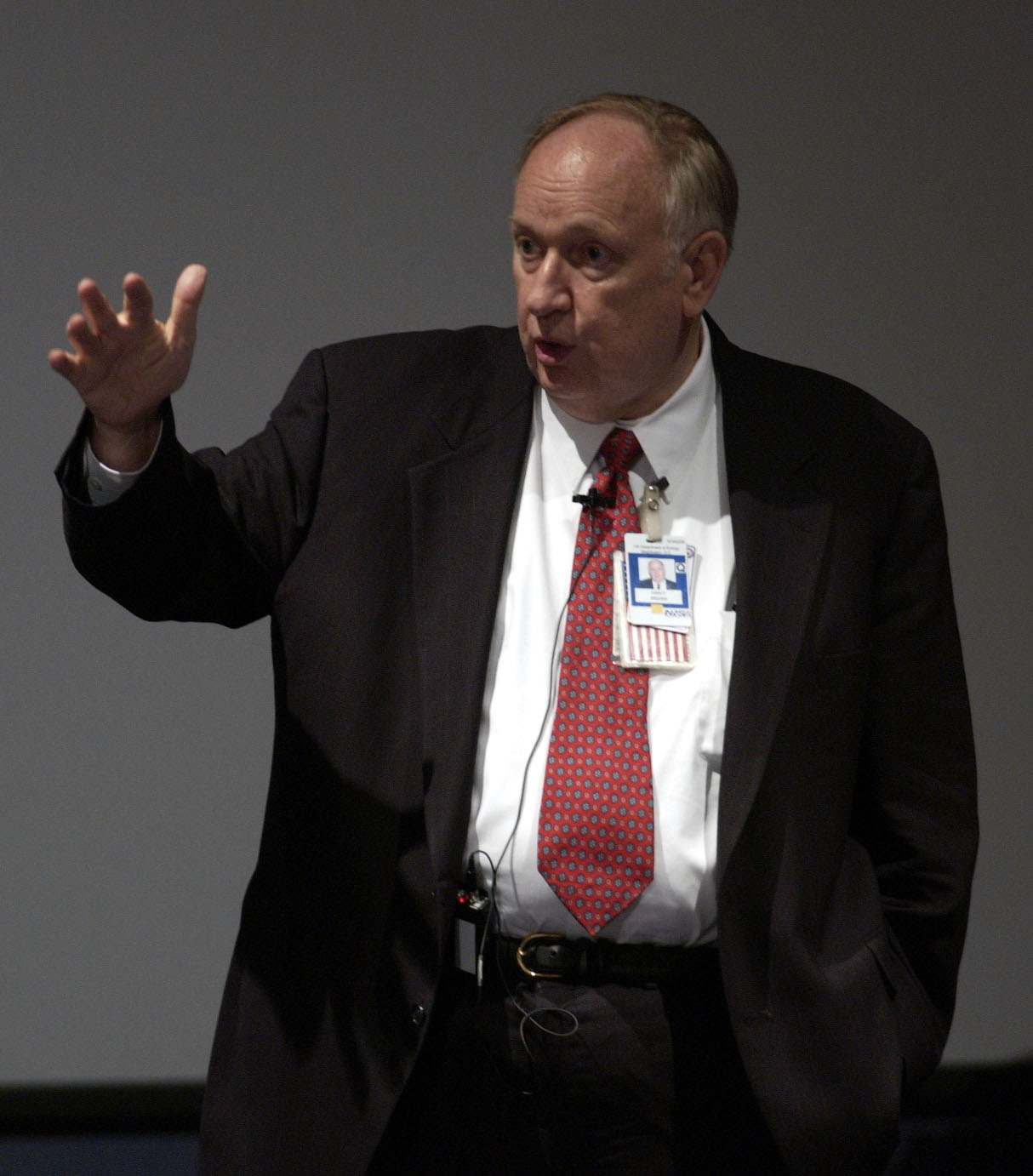

Under Secretary of Energy for Nuclear Security
- In office 2002–2007
- President: George W. Bush
- Preceded by: John A. Gordon
- Succeeded by: Tom D'Agostino

Personal details
- Born: Linton Forrestall Brooks; August 15, 1938 (age 87) Boston, Massachusetts, U.S.
- Education: Duke University (BS); University of Maryland (MA)

Military service
- Allegiance: United States
- Branch/service: United States Navy

Linton Forrestall Brooks (born August 15, 1938) is an American government official who served as the Under Secretary of Energy for Nuclear Security from 2002 to 2007.

== Early life and education ==
Born in Boston, Brooks earned a Bachelor of Science degree in physics from Duke University and a Master of Arts in government and politics from the University of Maryland. He also studied operations at the Naval War College. Brooks served as an officer in the United States Navy, commanding the nuclear-powered attack submarine Whale and retiring as a captain.

== Career ==
Prior to joining the George W. Bush Administration, Brooks was a vice president at the Center for Naval Analyses (CNA) and an advisor to Sandia National Laboratories. Brooks also served as Assistant Director for Strategic and Nuclear Affairs at the Arms Control and Disarmament Agency and was Head of the U.S. Delegation on Nuclear and Space Talks and Chief Strategic Arms Reductions (START) negotiator in the State Department with the rank of ambassador. In this latter capacity, he was responsible for final preparation of the START I Treaty, signed by Presidents Bush and Russian President Mikhail Gorbachev in Moscow on July 31, 1991. In December 1992, he performed a similar function during the final preparation of the January 3, 1993, START II Treaty.

=== National Nuclear Security Administration ===
Brooks was sworn in as Under Secretary of Energy for Nuclear Security on May 16, 2003, responsible for managing the National Nuclear Security Administration.

Brooks was the prime force in privatizing the major DOE laboratories. While the Los Alamos and Lawrence Livermore labs were formerly run by contractors on a non-profit basis, Brooks decided to change the contracts to a for-profit basis. He defended the move by advocating a theory that the inclusion of industrial partners would bring greater efficiency, justifying the additional cost over time. "That was the theory, and that was my belief," he said. A few years later, former Los Alamos director Sig Hecker testified before Congress about the change, and stated: "When we went the direction of contractorization we made a grievous error pushing the laboratories in a direction that simply isn't right for this country and we've suffered from that. The whole environment at these laboratories has changed."

With the new contract for Los Alamos National Laboratory, the agency decided to raise the contractor fee from $8 million to $79 million. The additional funds were to be extracted from the existing budget of the laboratory. When asked by LANL employees how the additional costs were to be paid, Brooks replied in December 2005 that the new contractor would "realize operational efficiencies." On November 20, 2007, the new LANL manager announced layoffs.

Brooks resigned on January 4, 2007, because of security lapses, according to the San Francisco Chronicle.

Brooks was reprimanded for not reporting to Energy Secretary Samuel Bodman regarding the theft of computer files at an NNSA facility in Albuquerque, New Mexico, which contained Social Security numbers and other data for 1,500 workers.

In October 2007, classified weapons-related documents on USB thumb drives from the Los Alamos National Laboratory in New Mexico were found during a drug raid in the home of a woman who had worked at the lab.

=== Later career ===
Since his retirement in 2007, Brooks has remained active as an independent consultant on national security issues. He is a strong proponent of developing and mentoring the next generation of nuclear policy analyst. He is a senior advisor at the Center for Strategic and International Studies for the Project on Nuclear Issues and expert-in-residence at the Public Policy and Nuclear Threats Boot Camp at the Institute on Global Conflict and Cooperation at University of California, San Diego.

In 2020, Brooks, along with over 130 other former Republican national security officials, signed a statement that asserted that President Trump was unfit to serve another term, and "To that end, we are firmly convinced that it is in the best interest of our nation that Vice President Joe Biden be elected as the next President of the United States, and we will vote for him."

== Honors ==
- 2019 - John S. Foster Medal
- 2013 - Thérèse Delpech Memorial Award
