= White Train =

American armored train used to transport nuclear weapons during the Cold War

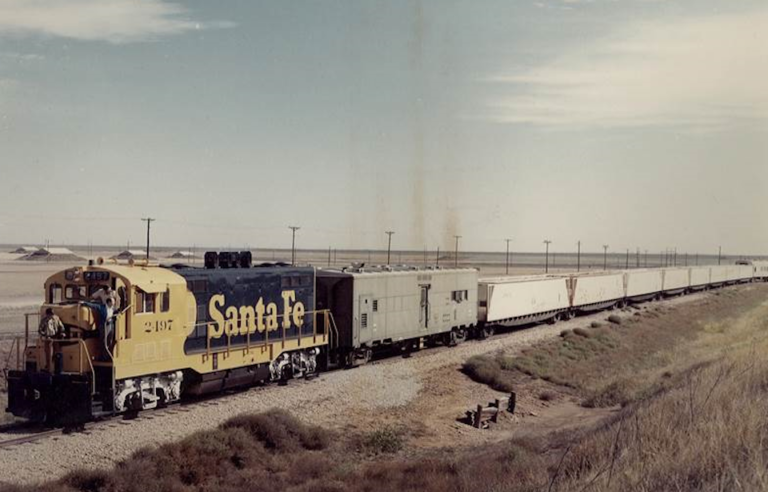
The White Train with ATSF CF7 #2497 leading in 1975.

The United States Department of Energy Nuclear Weapons Transport Train, known as the White Train, was used to transport nuclear weapons for most of the Cold War. From 1951 to 1987, the Department of Energy's Office of Secure Transportation (OST) used the train to move the weapons from the Pantex plant in the Texas panhandle, where they had been constructed. The train, which was armored and carried an array of defensive armament, became the focus for peace and anti-nuclear weapon activism in the west. While the train's color was changed numerous times to avoid notice, it continued to be referred to by its original color. After the last attempt to prosecute protesters who blocked the passage of the train failed, the Department of Energy began instead to move nuclear weapons by truck without public notice. Some of the White Train cars are preserved at the Amarillo Railroad Museum, while a few others are preserved at the Pantex Plant.

== See also ==
- List of armoured trains
- Naval Base Kitsap – U.S. base in Washington state
- Plowshares movement – Christian pacifist movement
- Safeguards Transporter – Truck for transporting nuclear weapons within the United States
