= Brandon Williams (politician) =

American politician (born 1967)

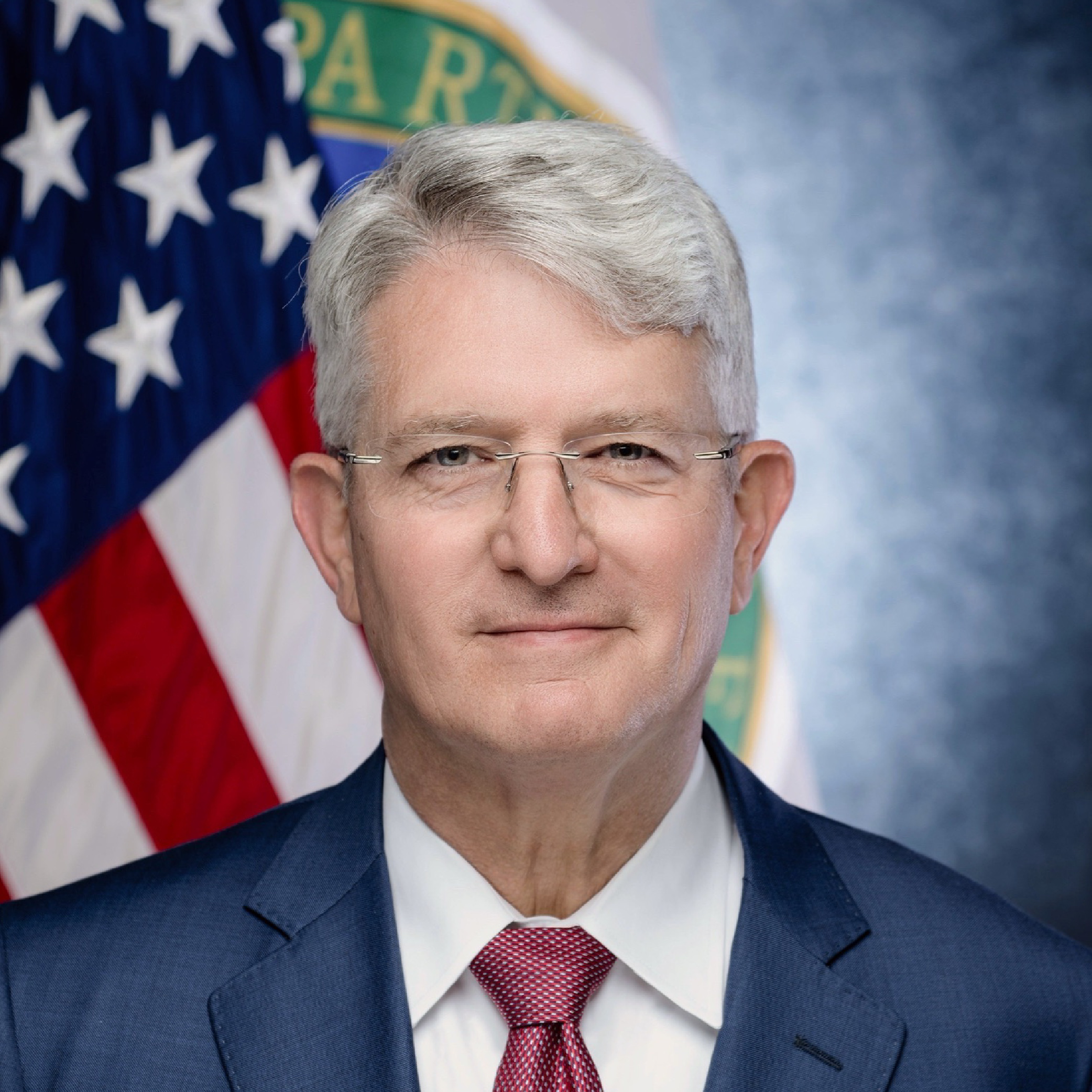
- Official portrait, 2025

United States Under Secretary of Energy for Nuclear Security
- Incumbent
- Assumed office September 26, 2025
- President: Donald Trump
- Preceded by: Jill Hruby

Member of the U.S. House of Representatives from New York's 22nd district
- In office January 3, 2023 – January 3, 2025
- Preceded by: John Katko (redistricted)
- Succeeded by: John Mannion

Personal details
- Born: Brandon McDonald Williams; May 22, 1967 (age 59) Dallas, Texas, U.S.
- Party: Republican
- Education: Baylor University; Pepperdine University (BA); University of Pennsylvania (MBA)

Military service
- Allegiance: United States
- Branch/service: United States Navy
- Years of service: 1991–1996
- Rank: Lieutenant

Brandon McDonald Williams (born May 22, 1967) is an American politician who serves as the United States under secretary for nuclear security and administrator of the National Nuclear Security Administration. A member of the Republican Party, he served as the representative for New York's 22nd congressional district from 2023 to 2025.

On January 16, 2025, President-elect Donald Trump named Williams as under secretary. He was confirmed by the U.S. Senate on a 51–47 vote on September 18, 2025, and sworn in on September 26, 2025.

== Early life and career ==
Williams was born in Dallas, Texas, to James McDonald "Don" Williams and Judy Williams. He was the second of five children. Don, a corporate lawyer, was chairman of the Trammell Crow Company from 1994 to 2002.

Williams attended St. Mark's School of Texas and Highland Park High School and played on the football team at Highland Park.

After high school, Williams enrolled at Baylor University, transferring to Pepperdine University after a year. He studied Asian studies at Harvard College for a year as a visiting undergraduate student. He graduated from Pepperdine with a Bachelor of Arts degree in liberal arts in 1990.

Williams joined the United States Navy in 1991, serving as an officer on the USS Georgia submarine. After leaving the U.S. Navy as a lieutenant in 1996, he studied at the Wharton School of the University of Pennsylvania, earning an MBA in 1998. He worked as an investment banker and business executive, and helped found two companies: IgniteIP and CPLANE.

In 2008, Williams and his wife purchased a 67 acres (27 ha) farm in Sennett, New York. The farm focused on bees, lavender, and truffles. They sold it in 2025.

== U.S. House of Representatives ==
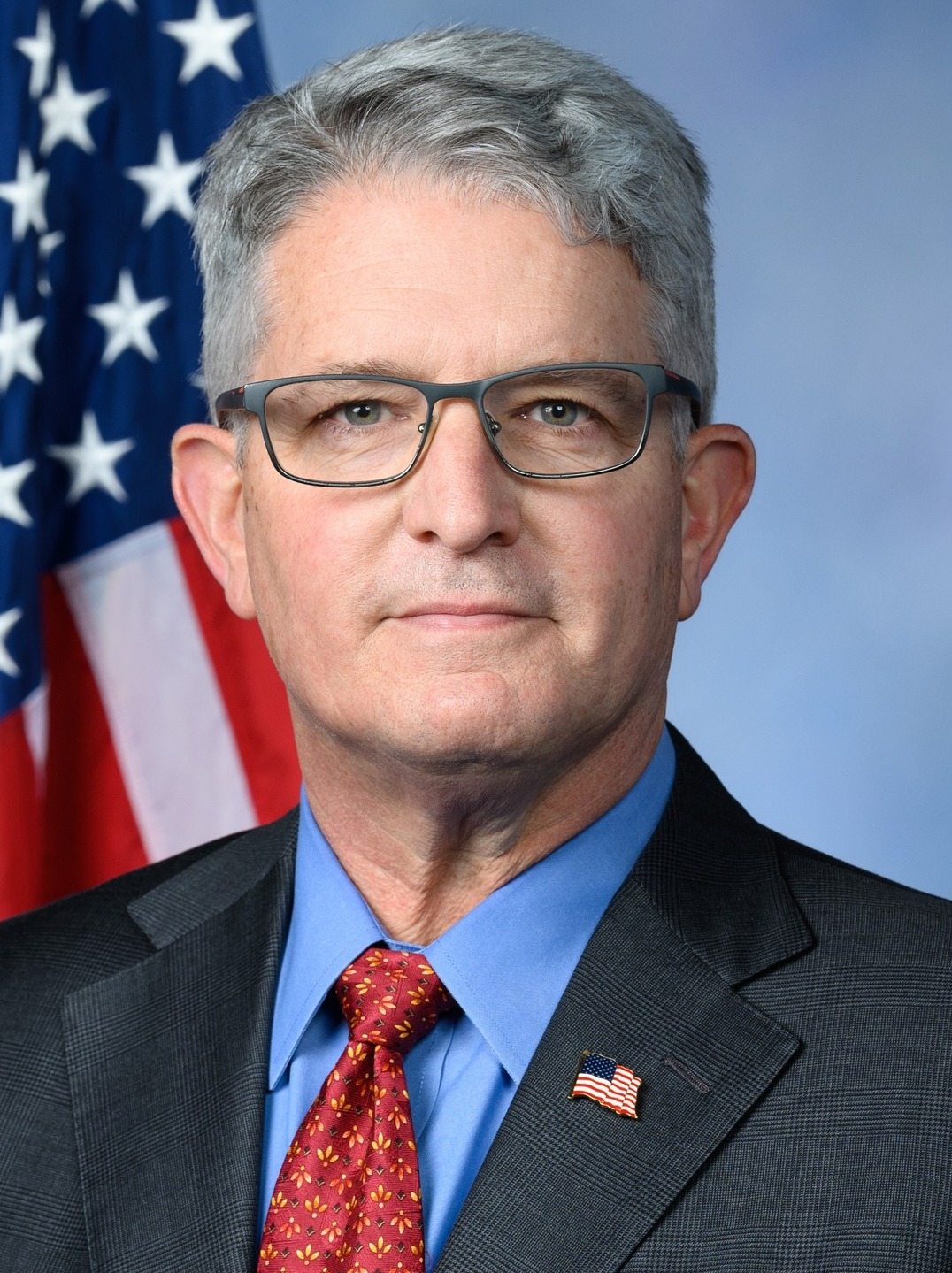
Official U.S. House Portrait

=== Elections ===
==== 2022 ====
On January 14, 2022, U.S. representative John Katko announced that he would not seek reelection in 2022, creating a vacancy. The contentious 2022 redistricting combined much of Katko's district with portions of a district represented by Claudia Tenney, whose district was divided. Tenney successfully ran in the new 24th district. Williams' home in Sennett lay in the 24th, two miles outside of the border of the 22nd; he chose to run in the 22nd, in part, to avoid a primary against Tenney. There is no legal requirement that a representative live within the district he represents, although the fact that he did not became a point of criticism.

Williams launched his campaign after Katko announced his retirement. He campaigned as a supporter of Trump and his America First agenda, a marked change from Katko, who had voted in favor of the second impeachment of Donald Trump. Williams was critical of Katko's bipartisanship and work across the aisle to accomplish legislative goals. Williams called it "politics as usual" and denigrated him as a RINO. Katko, while supporting other local Republicans, remained neutral in the primary. Katko supporters endorsed Steven Wells, a local party official who had lost to Tenney in the 2016 primary, and who was seen as the party's favorite. Wells was endorsed by House Republican Conference chair Elise Stefanik, while Williams was endorsed by the Conservative Party of New York. Campaign ads by the Republican Congressional Leadership Fund during the primary labeled Williams as out of touch and elitist for his truffle farm because it's an expensive gourmet ingredient. Wells kept a low profile, which may have contributed to his defeat. Williams' victory over Wells in the primary was described as an upset.

In the general election, Williams faced Democratic nominee Francis Conole, also a U.S. Navy veteran. The race gained national attention. Politico and The New York Times both noted the race as particularly competitive. National PACs ran ads, including the Democratic House Majority PAC drawing more attention to truffles. Top Republicans campaigned and fundraised for Williams, and Stefanik endorsed him. But Katko did not. Debates between Williams and Conole were contentious. Conole said that Williams did not know Central New York and that his self-descriptions as a "political outsider" were bogus. Williams said that Conole's 20-year military career left him ill-equipped to handle issues of the economy and private business.

In the general election, Williams defeated Conole by a margin of 1.5%.

==== 2024 ====
In August 2023, Williams announced that he was running for a second term in 2024. His campaign website and Facebook page described himself as a political outsider and said his priorities included lower energy costs, a secure border, public safety, good-paying jobs, and robust infrastructure projects. Williams was widely considered the most vulnerable sitting congressman after redistricting added more Democrats to his district.

During the campaign, Williams faced criticism over his stance on abortion. He had celebrated the overturning of Roe v. Wade and said that he believes abortion ought to only be available in cases of rape, incest or medical necessity.

He lost the November 5, 2024, election to Democratic state senator John Mannion.

2024 United States House of Representatives elections in New York, District 22
Party	Candidate	Votes	%
Democratic	John Mannion	194,450	54.56
Republican	Brandon Williams (incumbent)	161,939	45.44
Total votes		356,389	100.00
Democratic gain from Republican			

=== Tenure ===
He was one of four Republican representatives from New York who on January 11, 2023, called for George Santos to resign in light of false biographical statements that Santos had made. On December 1, he voted yes on the successful vote to expel Santos from the House.

On September 12, 2023, when House speaker Kevin McCarthy announced an impeachment inquiry against Joe Biden, Williams said he supported the inquiry.

An analysis by LegiStorm found that Williams's office had an unusually high rate of staff turnover, ranking as the 3rd highest rate in the House. At a 2023 Christmas party in Washington, a verbal confrontation between Williams and Michael Gordon, his former chief of staff and campaign manager, was recorded by Ryan Sweeney, another former staffer. Williams said that Sweeney and Gordon had threatened to expose personal details about his daughter's OnlyFans account.

=== Committee assignments ===
For the 118th Congress:

- Committee on Education and the Workforce
  - Subcommittee on Early Childhood, Elementary, and Secondary Education
  - Subcommittee on Higher Education and Workforce Development
- Committee on Science, Space, and Technology
  - Subcommittee on Energy (Chair)
  - Subcommittee on Research and Technology
- Committee on Transportation and Infrastructure
  - Subcommittee on Highways and Transit
  - Subcommittee on Railroads, Pipelines, and Hazardous Materials (Vice Chair)
  - Subcommittee on Water Resources and Environment

=== Caucus memberships ===
- Republican Governance Group

== Political views ==
In his 2022 campaign, Williams highlighted his "sharp conservative views." At a candidate forum, he named "socialist ideology" the number one threat to the United States. Williams, who homeschooled his children, is an advocate for school vouchers. His campaign statements expressed support for voter identification requirements, and for building a Mexico–United States border wall. At an open house shortly after his inauguration, Williams said his concerns included energy policy and government spending.

Williams said he voted for Donald Trump in the 2016 and 2020 U.S. presidential elections. He said he believes the 2020 presidential election raised questions about state election laws, adding he believed that President Joe Biden was elected legitimately.

He compared the January 6th hearings to the Moscow trials, and denounced Trump's indictment by a Manhattan grand jury in March 2023.

=== Abortion ===
In his 2022 campaign, Williams said "each state, not the federal government, should decide what restrictions, if any, to place on abortion." He personally opposes abortion and believes it should be banned with exceptions in the case of rape, incest or to save the life of the mother.

=== Gay rights ===
Williams stated that he would've voted for the Respect for Marriage Act if he were in office soon enough to do so. He argued, "it’s just moral and decent to respect same-sex unions under the law – marriage under the law."

=== Gun regulation ===
Williams said he would oppose any effort in Congress to restrict or remove access to firearms, including red flag laws and bans of assault weapons and high-capacity magazines. He has indicated that he would support stronger background checks for gun purchases.

== Personal life ==
Williams met his wife, Stephanie, at a Bible study group in Orlando, Florida, while in the U.S. Navy. They married in 1992 and have two children. They began homeschooling their children after a conflict with a teacher over religion while their daughter was in the second grade.

In addition to Florida, Texas, and upstate New York, Williams also lived in Seattle, New York City, and Silicon Valley. They moved to Washington, D.C., in 2025.

Williams's father Don is politically active in Dallas, particularly in social equality and racial justice and is a long time Democratic donor. Previously the CEO of Trammell Crow Company, in 1995 Don founded the Foundation for Community Empowerment, which focuses on urban revitalization in South Dallas. After the George Floyd protests of 2020, Don Williams and other members of the Dallas business elite developed an eight-point action plan that included raising the minimum wage, banning police use of chokeholds, and expanding Medicaid in Texas. Williams has said that he disagrees with his father politically but appreciates what he has done for Dallas's poor.

U.S. House of Representatives
Preceded by Claudia Tenney	Member of the U.S. House of Representatives from New York's 22nd congressional district 2023–2025	Succeeded by John Mannion
U.S. order of precedence (ceremonial)
Preceded by Marc Molinaro as former U.S. Representative	Order of precedence of the United States as former U.S. Representative	Succeeded by Jim Gardner as former U.S. Representative
