= Federal Protective Service =

Federal Protective Service may refer to the following federal government agencies:

- United States Federal Protective Service
- Federal Protective Service (Russia)

== See also ==
- Federal Protective Forces, law enforcement agencies of the United States Department of Energy
