= Frank Klotz =

United States Air Force general

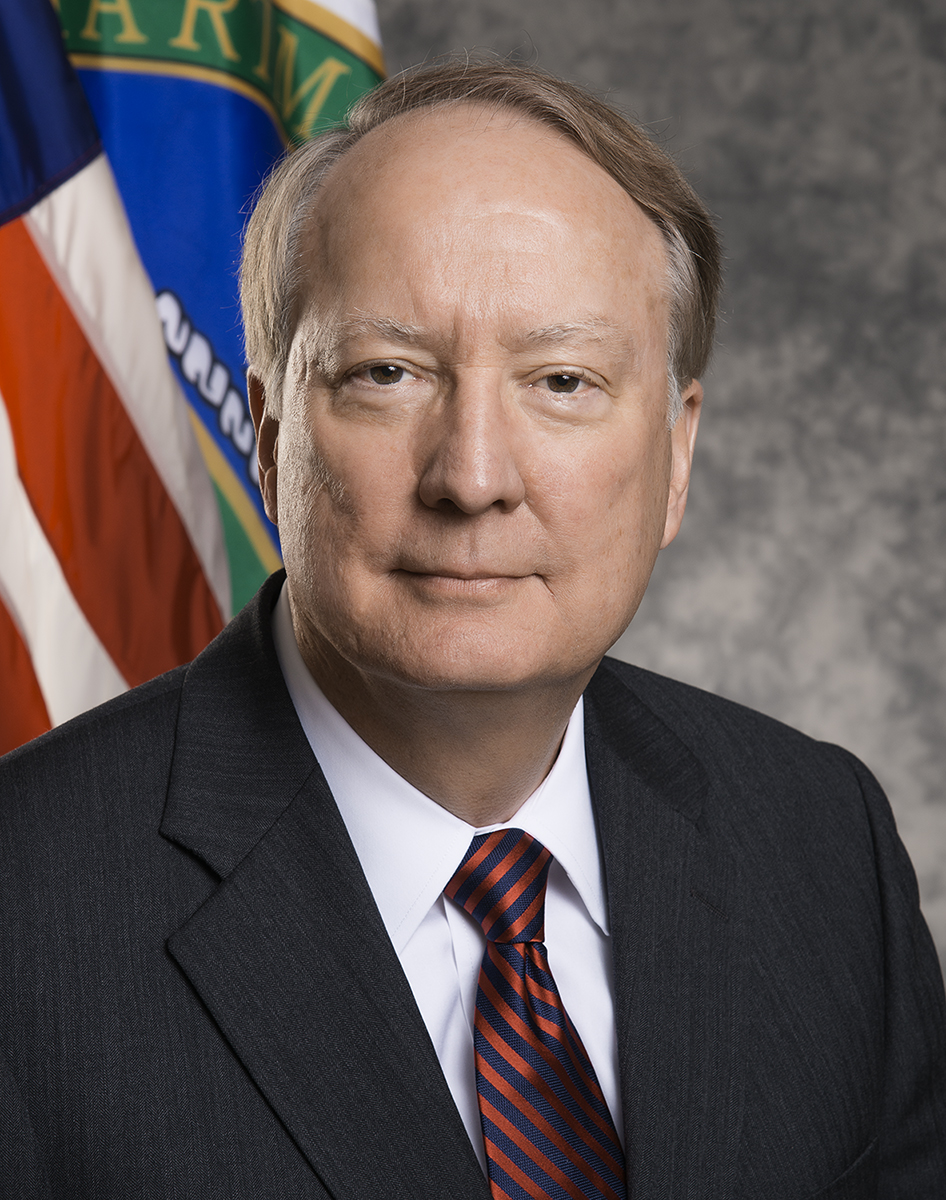

United States Under Secretary of Energy for Nuclear Security
- In office April 8, 2014 – January 20, 2018
- President: Barack Obama; Donald Trump
- Preceded by: Tom D'Agostino
- Succeeded by: Lisa Gordon-Hagerty

Personal details
- Born: Frank Graham Klotz; September 7, 1950 (age 76) Lubbock, Texas, U.S.
- Spouse: Nancy
- Education: U.S. Air Force Academy; University of Oxford; National War College

Military service
- Allegiance: United States
- Branch/service: United States Air Force
- Years of service: 1973–2011
- Rank: Lieutenant general
- Awards: Air Force Distinguished Service Medal (4); Defense Superior Service Medal (3); Legion of Merit (2); Defense Meritorious Service Medal

Frank Graham Klotz (born September 7, 1950) served as Under Secretary of Energy for Nuclear Security and Administrator for the National Nuclear Security Administration of the U.S. Department of Energy. He was confirmed for the position on April 8, 2014, and retired on January 20, 2018.

Until retiring in 2011, Klotz was a United States Air Force Lieutenant General who last served as the commander of Air Force Global Strike Command, Barksdale Air Force Base, Louisiana.

He was born in Lubbock, Texas.

== Biography ==
General Klotz entered the Air Force in 1973 as a distinguished graduate of the United States Air Force Academy. He has commanded a Minuteman missile squadron, a missile launch task force, an operations group, a missile wing and a numbered air force. The general's staff assignments include tours on the Air Staff, in the Office of the Secretary of Defense and at the State Department as a White House Fellow. He has also served on the faculty of the Air Force Academy, at NATO headquarters in Brussels, at the American Embassy in Moscow, Russia, and as the Director for Nuclear Policy and Arms Control with the National Security Council at the White House. He has also served as the vice commander, Air Force Space Command, Peterson Air Force Base, Colorado. Prior to assuming command of Air Force Global Strike Command, General Klotz was Assistant Vice Chief of Staff and Director, Air Force Staff, Headquarters U.S. Air Force, Washington, D.C.

Between 2014 and 2018, Klotz served as Under Secretary of Energy for Nuclear Security, responsible for the management and operation of NNSA, as well as policy matters across the Department of Energy and NNSA enterprise in support of the president's nuclear security agenda.

== Personal ==
In the 2024 United States presidential election, Klotz endorsed Kamala Harris.

== Education ==
1973 Distinguished graduate, Bachelor of Science degree in international affairs, United States Air Force Academy, Colorado Springs, Colorado
1975 Master of Philosophy degree in international relations, Oxford University, Oxford, England
1980 Doctor of Philosophy degree in politics, Oxford University, Oxford, England
1980 Squadron Officer School, Maxwell AFB, Alabama
1988 National War College, Fort Lesley J. McNair, Washington, D.C.
1996 Senior Officials in National Security Program, Syracuse University, New York
2005 Leadership at the Peak, Center for Creative Leadership, Colorado Springs, Colorado
2006 Joint Flag Officer Warfighting Course, Maxwell AFB, Alabama

== Assignments ==
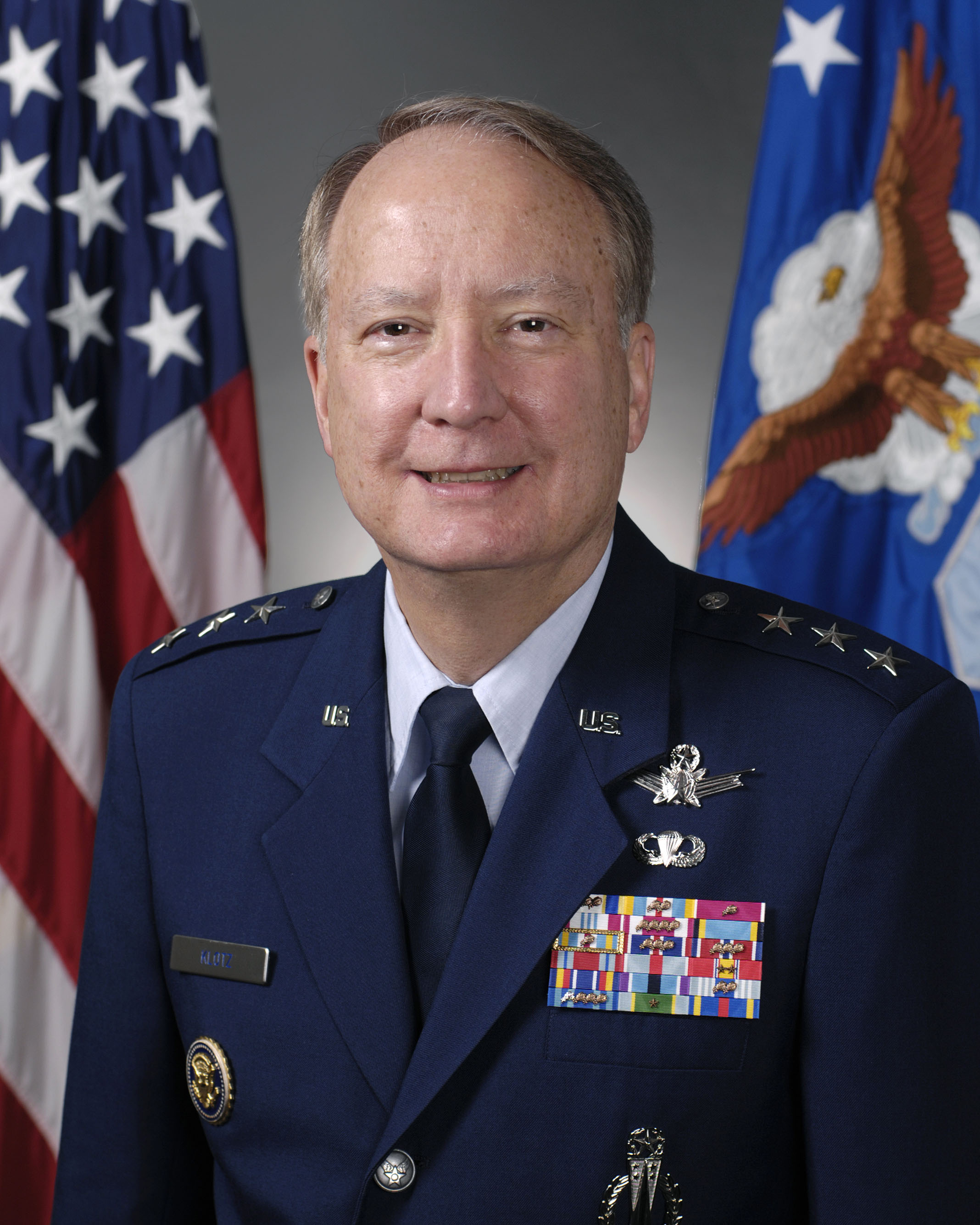
Klotz as an Air Force lieutenant general

1. October 1973 - July 1976, Rhodes scholar, Oxford University, Oxford, England
2. September 1976 - February 1978, international politico-military affairs officer, Directorate of Concepts, Headquarters U.S. Air Force, Washington, D.C.
3. March 1978 - July 1979, military assistant for special projects, Office of the Assistant Secretary of Defense for Manpower, Reserve Affairs and Logistics, The Pentagon, Washington, D.C.
4. July 1979 - August 1982, instructor, assistant professor and associate professor, Department of Political Science, U.S. Air Force Academy, Colorado Springs, Colo.
5. September 1982 - August 1983, White House Fellow and Special Assistant to the Deputy Secretary of State, Department of State, Washington, D.C.
6. September 1983 - January 1984, student, 4315th Combat Crew Training Squadron, Vandenberg AFB, California
7. January 1984 - August 1984, Minuteman Intercontinental Ballistic Missile combat crew commander, 446th Strategic Missile Squadron, Grand Forks AFB, North Dakota
8. August 1984 - July 1985, operations officer, 447th Strategic Missile Squadron, Grand Forks AFB, North Dakota
9. July 1985 - March 1986, Chief, Standardization and Evaluation Division, 321st Strategic Missile Wing, Grand Forks Air Force Base, N.D.
10. March 1986 - July 1987, Commander, 447th Strategic Missile Squadron, Grand Forks AFB, N.D.
11. July 1987 - June 1988, senior research fellow and student, National War College, Fort Lesley J. McNair, Washington, D.C.
12. July 1988 - February 1990, defense plans officer, U.S. Mission to NATO, Brussels, Belgium
13. February 1990 - August 1991, Chief, Nuclear Biological and Chemical Plans Branch, U.S. Mission to NATO, Brussels, Belgium
14. August 1991 - February 1993, Commander, 321st Operations Group, Grand Forks AFB, N.D.
15. February 1993 - December 1994, Director, Chief of Staff's Operations Group, Headquarters U.S. Air Force, Washington, D.C.
16. January 1995 - August 1996, Commander, 91st Missile Group (later redesignated 91st Missile Wing), Minot AFB, N.D.
17. August 1996 - August 1997, Director of Logistics, Headquarters Air Force Space Command, Peterson AFB, Colo.
18. August 1997 - August 1998, Military Fellow, Council on Foreign Relations, New York City, New York
19. September 1998 - July 1999, Defense Attaché Designate - Moscow, Arlington, Va.
20. July 1999 - June 2001, Defense Attaché, U.S. Defense Attaché Office, American Embassy, Moscow, Russia
21. July 2001 - May 2003, Director for Nuclear Policy and Arms Control, National Security Council, the White House, Washington, D.C.
22. May 2003 - October 2005, Commander, 20th Air Force, Air Force Space Command, and Commander, Task Force 214, U.S. Strategic Command, Francis E. Warren AFB, Wyoming
23. October 2005 - August 2007, Vice Commander, Air Force Space Command, Peterson AFB, Colo.
24. August 2007 - August 2009, Assistant Vice Chief of Staff and Director, Air Force Staff, Headquarters U.S. Air Force, Washington, D.C.
25. August 2009 – January 2011, Commander, Air Force Global Strike Command, Barksdale Air Force Base, Louisiana.

== Awards and decorations ==
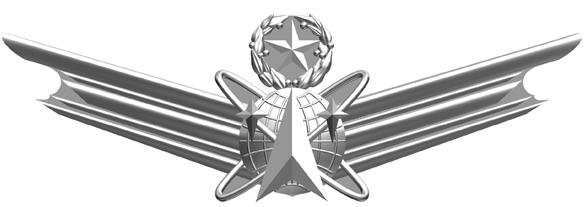
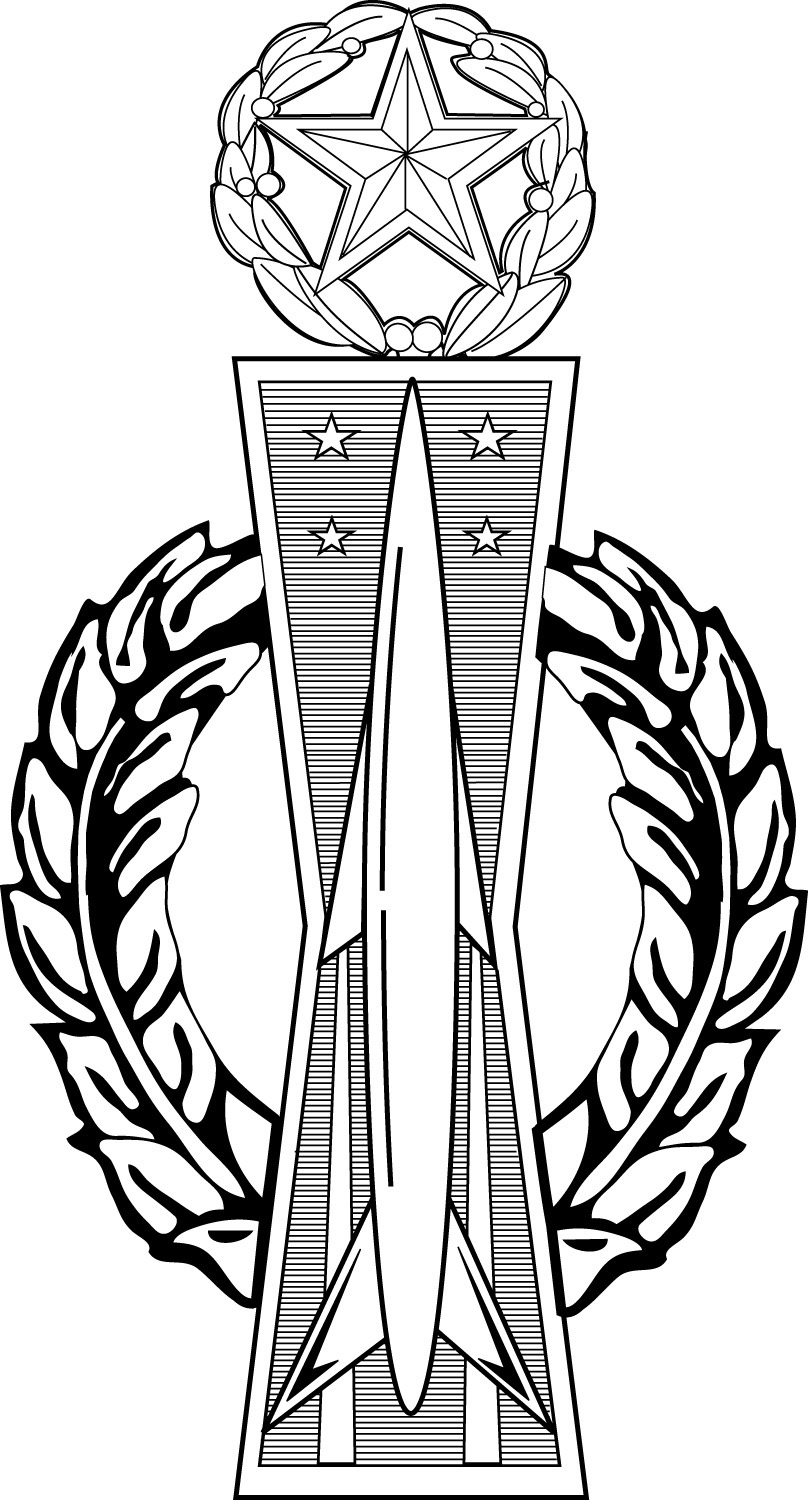
Master Space Badge
Basic Parachutist Badge
Master Missile Operations Badge
Presidential Service Badge

Air Force Distinguished Service Medal with three bronze oak leaf clusters
Defense Superior Service Medal with two bronze oak leaf clusters
Legion of Merit with bronze oak leaf cluster
Defense Meritorious Service Medal
Meritorious Service Medal with four bronze oak leaf clusters
Aerial Achievement Medal
Joint Meritorious Unit Award with bronze oak leaf cluster
Air Force Outstanding Unit Award with three bronze oak leaf clusters
Air Force Organizational Excellence Award with three bronze oak leaf clusters
Combat Readiness Medal
Air Force Recognition Ribbon
National Defense Service Medal with two bronze service stars
Global War on Terrorism Service Medal
Humanitarian Service Medal
Air Force Overseas Long Tour Service Ribbon with two bronze oak leaf clusters
Air Force Longevity Service Award with silver and three bronze oak leaf clusters
Small Arms Expert Marksmanship Ribbon with bronze service star
Air Force Training Ribbon

=== Other achievements ===
Member, Council on Foreign Relations
1973 Rhodes Scholar
1983 Named one of Ten Outstanding Young Men of America, U.S. Jaycees
2002 Heritage Hall of Fame Inductee, U.S. Air Force Academy Preparatory School
2006 Gen. Thomas D. White Space Trophy, Air Force Association

== Effective dates of promotion ==
Insignia	Rank	Date
	Lieutenant general	October 17, 2005
	Major general	October 1, 2003
	Brigadier general	December 1, 1999
	Colonel	February 1, 1991
	Lieutenant colonel	March 1, 1985
	Major	November 1, 1982
	Captain	June 6, 1977
	First lieutenant	June 6, 1975
	Second lieutenant	June 6, 1973

== Publications ==
- Space, Commerce, and National Security (New York: Council on Foreign Relations Press, 1998)
- America on the Ice: Antarctic Policy Issues (Washington, D.C.: National Defense University Press, 1990) ISBN 0-89875-756-8
- "The President and the Control of Nuclear Weapons," in Kozak and Cibolski, eds., The American Presidency: A Policy Perspective from Readings and Documents, (Chicago, Nelson Hall, 1985)
- "Future Soviet-American Arms Control: Implications for NATO," in Kincade, et al., eds., Approaches to East-West Arms Control (Washington, D.C.: Arms Control Association, 1979)

== See also ==
- Air Force Headquarters
- U.S. Air Force
- National Nuclear Security Administration

Military offices
Preceded by Daniel P. Leaf	Vice Commander of the Air Force Space Command; October 2005-August 2007	Succeeded by Thomas F. Deppe
Preceded by James Kowalski	Commander, Air Force Global Strike Command; 2009-2011	Succeeded by James Kowalski
Government offices
Preceded by Bruce Held (acting)	Under Secretary of Energy for Nuclear Security; April 2014 – present	Succeeded by Incumbent
