= Jill Hruby =

American civil servant (born 1959)

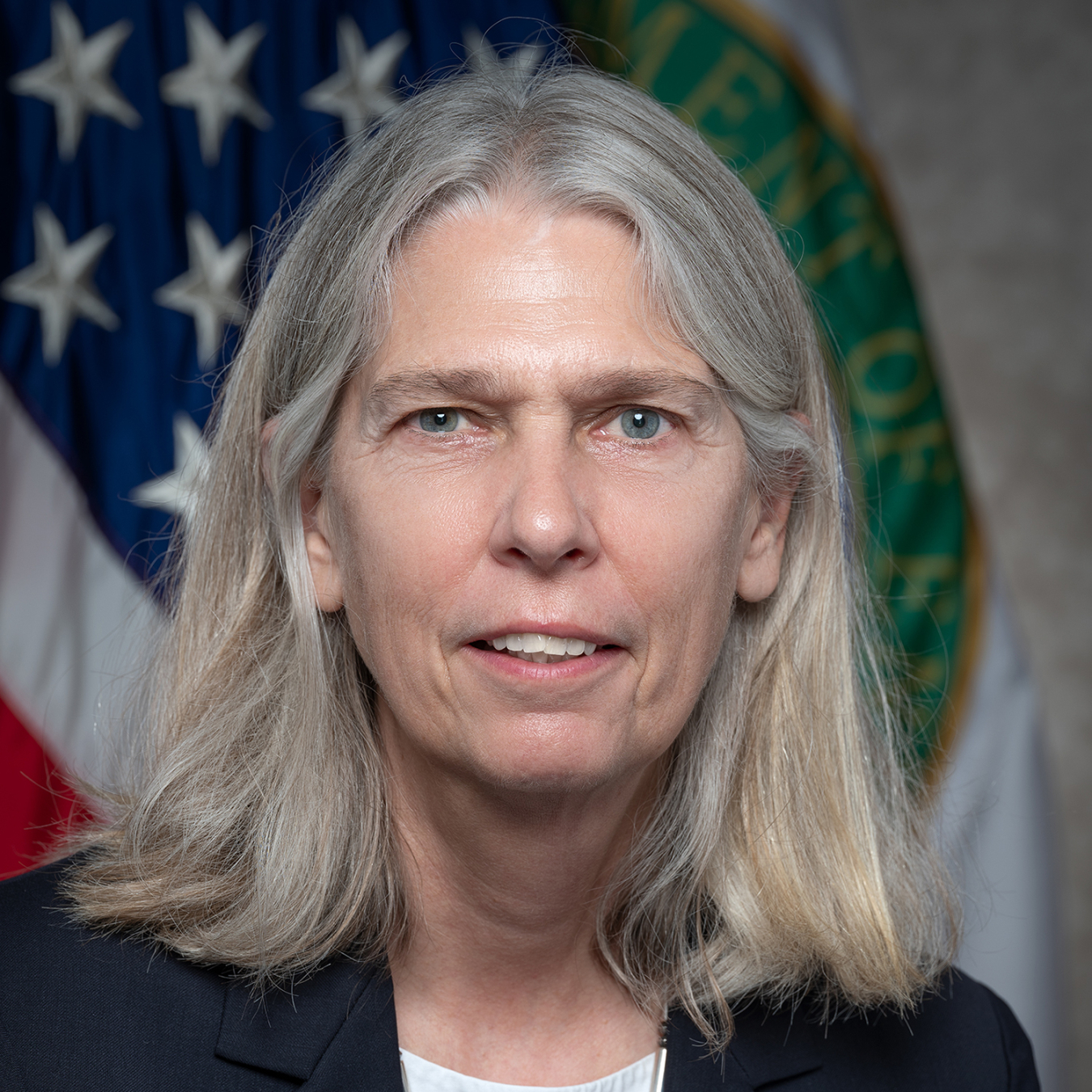

Under Secretary of Energy for Nuclear Security Administrator of the National Nuclear Security Administration
- In office July 26, 2021 – January 20, 2025
- President: Joe Biden
- Preceded by: Lisa Gordon-Hagerty
- Succeeded by: Brandon Williams

Personal details
- Education: Purdue University (BS); University of California, Berkeley (MS)
- Jill Hruby's voice Hruby's opening statement at a Senate Armed Services Strategic Forces Subcommittee hearing on the FY2024 National Nuclear Security Administration budget request Recorded April 18, 2023

Jill M. Hruby is an American mechanical engineer and government official. From 2021 to 2025, Hruby served as Under Secretary of Energy for Nuclear Security and Administrator of the National Nuclear Security Administration, a post subject to Senate confirmation. Jill Hruby made history as the first woman to ever head a U.S. nuclear weapons lab, serving as director of Sandia National Laboratories from 2015 to 2017.

== Early life and education ==
Jill M. Hruby was born in 1959 in Defiance, Ohio. She is a native of Ann Arbor, Michigan. Hruby earned her bachelor's degree from Purdue University College of Engineering and her master's degree from the UC Berkeley College of Engineering, both in mechanical engineering.

== Career ==
Hruby joined Sandia National Laboratories as a member of the technical staff in 1983 and retired as the director in 2017. At Sandia, Hruby held roles of increasing management responsibilities with experiences in nuclear weapons systems and component design, nuclear non-proliferation, defense and homeland security technologies and systems, renewable energy, materials science, engineering sciences, and microsystems technology. She was the first woman to lead a national security lab. Since her retirement, she served as the inaugural Sam Nunn Distinguished Fellow at the Nuclear Threat Initiative from 2018 to 2019.

On April 14, 2021, President Joe Biden nominated Hruby to be the Under Secretary of Energy for Nuclear Security and Administrator of the National Nuclear Security Administration. The nomination has been endorsed by Secretary of Energy Jennifer Granholm. On April 22, 2021, her nomination was sent to the Senate. On June 16, 2021, a hearing on her nomination was held before the Senate Armed Services Committee. On June 10, 2021, her nomination was reported out of committee. On July 22, 2021, her nomination was confirmed by a vote of 79–16. She was sworn in on July 26, 2021.

== Professional memberships and awards ==
Hruby has been a member of the Defense Science Board, the National Nuclear Security Administration Defense Programs Advisory Committee, and the National Academy of Science Committee for International Security and Arms Control.

In 2016, she received the Suzanne Jenniches Upward Mobility Award from the Society of Women Engineers. In 2017, Business Insider named her the second most powerful female engineer. She has received the Department of Energy Secretary's Exceptional Service Award, the National Nuclear Security Administrator's Distinguished Service Gold Award, and Office of the Secretary of Defense Medal for Exceptional Public Service.

On May 13, 2022, Hruby was awarded an honorary doctorate of engineering by her undergraduate alma mater, Purdue University.

Hruby was elected to the National Academy of Engineering in 2022.

On May 5, 2023, Hruby was awarded an honorary Doctor of Science by Michigan State University for her notable career in engineering and science, leadership in nuclear security and dedication to the development and enhancement of national security.
