= Office of Secure Transportation =

United States federal law enforcement agency

The Office of Secure Transportation (OST) is a highly-specialized law enforcement division of the National Nuclear Security Administration within the United States Department of Energy. The OST's mission is to provide safe and secure transportation of nuclear weapons and components and special nuclear materials and conduct other missions in support of U.S. national security.

== History ==
Since 1947, the U.S. Department of Energy (DOE) and its predecessor agencies have moved nuclear weapons, nuclear weapons components, and special nuclear materials by a variety of commercial and government transportation modes.

In the late 1960s, worldwide terrorism and acts of violence prompted a review of procedures for safeguarding these materials. As a result, a comprehensive new series of regulations and equipment was developed to enhance the safety and security of these materials in transit. The Transportation Safeguards Division (TSD), renamed Office of Secure Transportation (OST) in the late 1990s, was subsequently established in 1975 at the Department of Energy's (DOE) Albuquerque Operations Office.

Since its establishment in 1975, OST has accumulated over 100 million miles of over-the-road experience transporting DOE-owned cargo with no accidents causing a fatality or release of radioactive material. There have been accidents, however. In November 1996, after 13 years of accident-free travel, a convoy in western Nebraska encountered an unexpected ice storm. A tractor-trailer in the convoy skidded off the road and rolled onto its side, jostling its cargo of two nuclear bombs.

The OST modified and redesigned transport equipment to incorporate features that effectively enhance self-protection and deny unauthorized access to the materials. It was during this time that OST curtailed the use of commercial transportation systems and moved to a total federal operation.

== Operations ==
OST-classified shipments are now conducted in a low-profile, no-notice manner to ensure the security and safety of the cargo. The personnel who operate the transportation vehicles and the escort vehicles are federal agents. The OST annual budget is about $250 million.

As of 2023, its headquarters are in Albuquerque, NM, and the OST Training Command is in Fort Chaffee, Arkansas.

=== Travel restrictions ===
The OST attempts to ensure its convoys do not travel during periods of inclement weather. The OST monitors weather from their operations center, and weather checks are performed every two hours. If the convoys are going to encounter or do encounter adverse weather, provisions exist for the convoys to seek shelter at previously identified facilities. As an additional travel precaution, the OST has imposed a maximum 65 miles-per-hour speed limit on its convoys, even if the posted limit is greater.

Although OST provides sleeper berths in all vehicles, federal agents (couriers) accompanying shipments are not to exceed 32 hours of continuous travel without then having 8 hours of uninterrupted, stationary bed rest.

=== Staffing ===
As of 2017, OST employed 322 couriers. It seeks to hire military veterans, particularly ex-special-operations forces. Besides dealing with "irregular hours, personal risks, and exposure to inclement weather," agents "may be called upon to use deadly force if necessary to prevent the theft, sabotage or takeover of protected materials by unauthorized persons."

=== Monitoring ===
The OST operates a nationwide communications system located in Albuquerque, New Mexico. This system, known as the Transportation and Emergency Control Center (TECC), monitors the status and location of shipments and maintains real-time communications 24 hours a day with every convoy. TECC is the first line in the support of convoys.

Through an active liaison program, the DOE maintains an emergency contact directory of federal and state response organizations located throughout the contiguous United States. During a convoy emergency, an open communications line is established and maintained between the control center and the appropriate state agencies. This way a continuous update of information from the scene can be relayed to the responding units.

OST has established procedures should a law enforcement officer stop an OST vehicle. The liaison program provides law enforcement officers information to assist them in recognizing one of these vehicles should it be involved in an accident and what actions to take in conjunction with the actions of the federal agents.

In the case of an emergency event that threatened the cargo of an OST safeguards shipment, DOE would declare a National Security Area (NSA), which temporarily places an area under the effective control of the DOE/NNSA. A National Security Area is defined as an area established within the United States and used for the purpose of safeguarding classified, sensitive, and/or restricted data to protect DOE/NNSA equipment and/or material. The CCIC at the scene will define the boundary, mark it with a physical barrier, and post warning signs. The declaration of a National Security Area does not relieve state and local authorities of their responsibilities for the area surrounding the NSA, including evacuations or other protective actions as needed.

=== Emergency response ===
DOE has a system of emergency response including initial notification, monitoring and assessment of the situation, and working with other agencies to resolve the emergency.

In the event of a vehicle accident involving a Safe Secure Trailer (SST) or Safeguards Transporter (SGT), the local responders (e.g., police, sheriff, state trooper, fire department, etc.), after the initial interface with the federal agents, will be asked to meet with the CCIC to discuss the situation and the best way to solve it.

== See also ==
- Federal Protective Forces
