= Daniel P. Leaf =

United States Air Force general

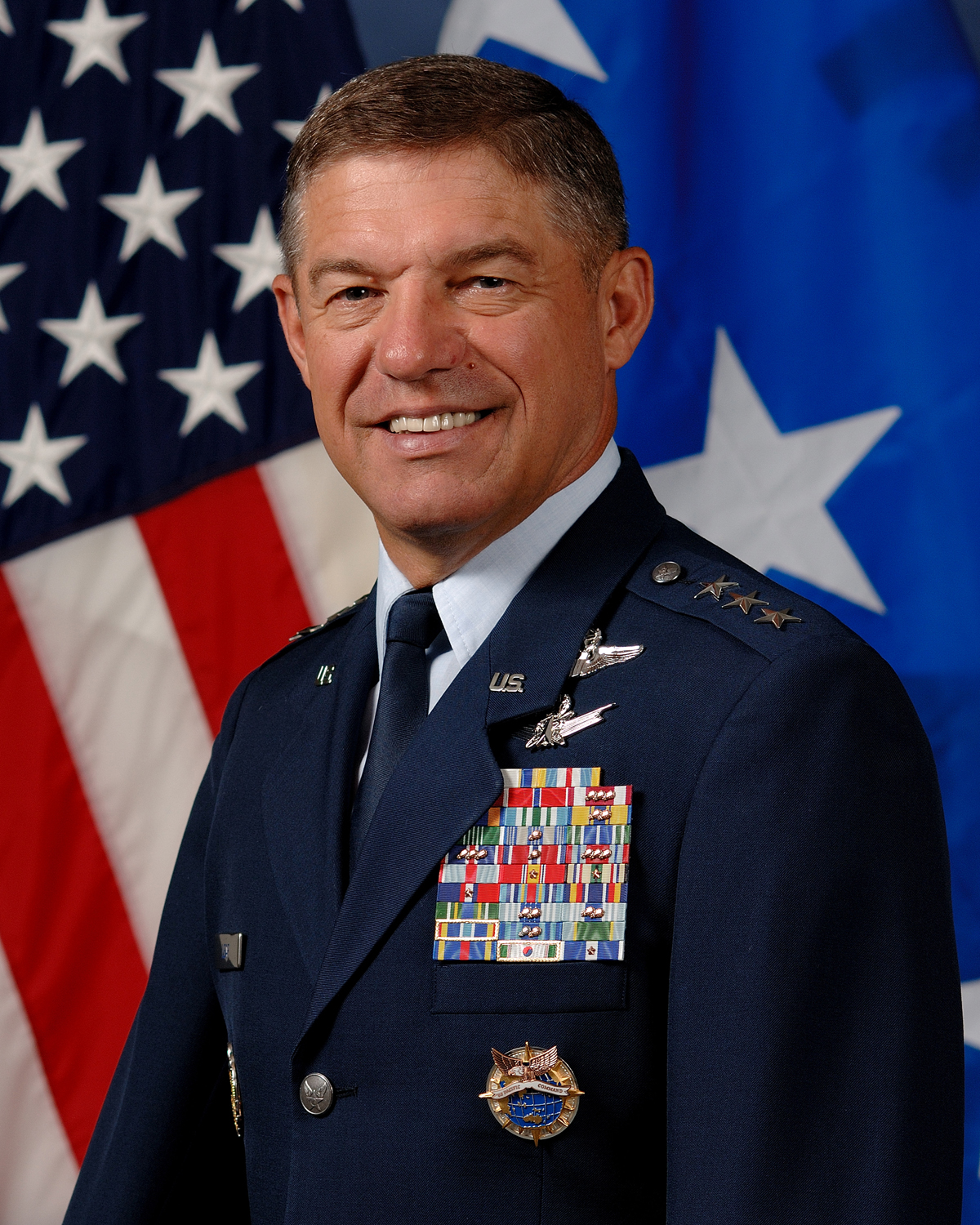
- Leaf in 2006
- Born: Green Bay, Wisconsin
- Military career
- Allegiance: United States
- Branch: United States Air Force
- Service years: 1974–2008
- Rank: Lieutenant general
- Nickname: "Fig"
- Commands: 1st Operations Group; 20th Fighter Wing; 31st Fighter Wing; 31st Air Expeditionary Wing; Air Force Space Command; United States Pacific Command
- Awards: See below

Daniel P. Leaf is a former United States Air Force officer; he served as deputy commander and acting commander of United States Pacific Command at Camp H. M. Smith in Hawaii.

== Early life and education ==
A native of Shawano, Wisconsin, Leaf earned his commission as a distinguished graduate of the University of Wisconsin–Madison Air Force ROTC program in 1974.

== Career ==
Leaf has commanded a flight, two squadrons, an operations group and two fighter wings, and has directed joint operations.

In 1995, LtGen Leaf served as the J-3 for Joint Task Force-Southwest Asia and flew the F-15C over Southern Iraq, enforcing U.N. sanctions on the Saddam Hussein regime. He deployed to Incirlik Air Base, Turkey, with one of his 20th Fighter Wing squadrons in 1998 and flew the F-16CJ on Operation Northern Watch suppression of enemy air defense missions over Northern Iraq. During Operation Allied Force, LtGen Leaf commanded the 31st Air Expeditionary Wing, which included F-16CG, F-16CJ, F-15E, F-117A, A-10A and EC-130 aircraft squadrons. He flew and led F-16CG day and night combat missions against fixed and mobile targets in Serbia and Kosovo. During Operation Iraqi Freedom, he served as the Director, Air Component Coordination Element with the Coalition Land Forces Component Commander in Kuwait and Iraq. In that role, he served as the Air Component Commander's direct representative to the Land Commander during planning and initial major combat operations.

Prior to this assignment, General Leaf was the Vice Commander of Air Force Space Command, Peterson Air Force Base, Colorado. Other staff assignments include duty as the Air Force's Director of Operational Requirements and the Deputy J-3, U.S. Forces Korea.

== Personal life ==
Leaf retired from the U.S. Air Force in 2008 after more than 33 years of service. He worked for Northrop Grumman Information Systems as the Vice President, Strategic Initiatives, from September 2008 to January 2012. He returned to government service as the Director of the Asia-Pacific Center for Security Studies (APCSS) in January 2012. In 2015, the center was renamed the Daniel K. Inouye Asia-Pacific Center for Security Studies (DKI APCSS). After five years at DKI APCSS, he left to start Phase Minus 1, LLC. He also serves as the Executive Director for Indo-Asia Pacific Operations for CyberSpace Operations Consulting, Inc.

== Education ==
- 1974 Bachelor of Science degree in political science, University of Wisconsin–Madison
- 1976 Squadron Officer School, by correspondence
- 1983 Air Command and Staff College, by correspondence
- 1986 Honor graduate, United States Army Command and General Staff College, Fort Leavenworth, Kansas
- 1986 Master of Arts degree in military art and science, Army Command and General Staff College, Fort Leavenworth, Kansas
- 1987 Outstanding graduate, Air War College, by correspondence
- 1988 U.S. Army Battalion Pre-Command Course, Fort Leavenworth, Kansas
- 1993 Air War College, Maxwell Air Force Base, Alabama
- 1998 Senior Information Warfare Applications Course, Maxwell AFB, Alabama
- 2000 National Security Leadership Course, Syracuse University, Syracuse, New York
- 2000 Joint Flag Officers Warfighting Course, Maxwell AFB, Alabama
- 2001 Joint Force Air Component Commander Course, Maxwell AFB, Alabama
- 2004 Leadership at the Peak, Center for Creative Leadership, Colorado Springs, Colorado

== Military Assignments ==
1. December 1974 - November 1975, student, pilot training, Columbus AFB, Mississippi
2. March 1976 - November 1976, student, F-4D initial training, George AFB, California
3. November 1976 - April 1978, F-4D aircraft commander, flight lead and standardization and evaluation officer, 7th and 9th Tactical Fighter Squadrons, Holloman AFB, New Mexico
4. May 1978 - August 1978, student, OV-10 training, Patrick AFB, Florida
5. August 1978 - April 1980, OV-10 forward air controller, 19th Tactical Air Support Squadron; instructor pilot and flight examiner, 51st Composite Group; later, Chief, and standardization and evaluation officer, 5th Tactical Group, Osan Air Base, South Korea
6. April 1980 - July 1981, weapons system project officer and standardization and evaluation flight examiner, Headquarters Pacific Air Forces, Hickam AFB, Hawaii
7. July 1981 - June 1985, F-15C pilot, instructor pilot, Chief of Training and Scheduling, and flight commander, 44th Tactical Fighter Squadron, later, standardization and evaluation branch chief, 18th Tactical Fighter Wing, Kadena AB, Japan
8. June 1985 - May 1988, student, later, faculty member, Army Command and General Staff College, Fort Leavenworth, Kansas
9. May 1988 - May 1992, F-15 instructor pilot, Chief of Standardization and Evaluation, and operations officer, 426th Tactical Fighter Training Squadron, later, Commander, 555th Tactical Fighter Training Squadron, later, Commander, 58th Operations Support Squadron, Luke AFB, Ariz.
10. June 1992 - June 1993, Air Combat Command-sponsored research fellow and student, Air War College, Maxwell AFB, Alabama
11. July 1993 - July 1995, Deputy Commander, later, Commander, 1st Operations Group, Langley AFB, Virginia
12. March 1995 - June 1995, J-3, Joint Task Force Southwest Asia, Riyadh, Saudi Arabia
13. July 1995 - June 1997, Deputy J-3, U.S. Forces Korea, and Assistant Deputy C-3, Republic of Korea/U.S. Combined Forces Command, Yongsan, South Korea
14. July 1997 - November 1998, Commander, 20th Fighter Wing, Shaw AFB, South Carolina
15. November 1998 - January 2000, Commander, 31st Fighter Wing and 31st Air Expeditionary Wing, Aviano AB, Italy
16. January 2000 - November 2002, Director of Operational Requirements, Deputy Chief of Staff for Air and Space Operations, Headquarters U.S. Air Force, Washington, D.C.
17. December 2002 - July 2003, Director of Operational Capability Requirements, Deputy Chief of Staff for Air and Space Operations, Headquarters U.S. Air Force, Washington, D.C. (February 2003 - April 2003, Director, U.S. Central Command Air Forces Air Component Coordination Element, Coalition Land Forces Component Headquarters, Camp Doha, Kuwait)
18. August 2003 - September 2005, Vice Commander, Air Force Space Command, Peterson AFB, Colorado
19. October 2005 - April 2008, Deputy Commander, U.S. Pacific Command, Camp H.M. Smith, Hawaii

== Flight information ==
- Rating: Command pilot
- Flight hours: More than 3,600
- Aircraft flown: F-4C/D, OV-10, O-2, F-15A/B/C/D, F-16 Block 25/40/42/50, UH-1N and HH-60G

== Awards and decorations ==
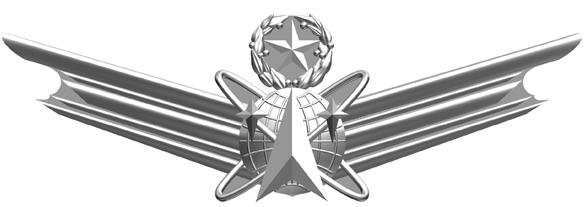
| US Air Force Command Pilot Badge |
| Master Air Force Space and Missile Badge |

Personal decorations
| | Defense Distinguished Service Medal |
| | Air Force Distinguished Service Medal |
| | Defense Superior Service Medal |
| Width-44 crimson ribbon with a pair of width-2 white stripes on the edges | Legion of Merit with bronze oak leaf cluster |
| | Bronze Star Medal |
| | Meritorious Service Medal with three bronze oak leaf clusters |
| | Air Medal with bronze oak leaf cluster |
| | Joint Service Commendation Medal |
| | Air Force Commendation Medal with two bronze oak leaf clusters |
| Width-44 myrtle green ribbon with width-3 white stripes at the edges and five width-1 stripes down the center; the central white stripes are width-2 apart | Army Commendation Medal |
| | Air Force Achievement Medal with bronze oak leaf cluster |
| Width-44 ribbon with two width-9 ultramarine blue stripes surrounded by two pairs of two width-4 green stripes; all these stripes are separated by width-2 white borders | Army Achievement Medal |
Unit awards
| | Air Force Outstanding Unit Award with three bronze oak leaf clusters |
| | Air Force Organizational Excellence Award with bronze oak leaf cluster |
Service awards
| | Combat Readiness Medal with three bronze oak leaf clusters |
| | Air Force Recognition Ribbon |
Campaign and service medals
| | National Defense Service Medal with bronze service star |
| | Southwest Asia Service Medal with bronze service star |
| | Kosovo Campaign Medal with bronze service star |
| | Global War on Terrorism Expeditionary Medal |
| | Global War on Terrorism Service Medal |
| | Korea Defense Service Medal |
Service, training, and marksmanship awards
| | Air Force Overseas Short Tour Service Ribbon with two bronze oak leaf clusters |
| | Air Force Overseas Long Tour Service Ribbon with two bronze oak leaf clusters |
| | Air Force Expeditionary Service Ribbon with gold frame |
| | Air Force Longevity Service Award with silver and two bronze oak leaf clusters |
| | Small Arms Expert Marksmanship Ribbon |
| | Air Force Training Ribbon |
Foreign awards
| | Republic of Korea Presidential Unit Citation |
| | NATO Medal for Kosovo Service with bronze service star |

=== Other achievements ===
- 1975 Distinguished graduate, Flying Training Award and Air Training Command's Commander's *Trophy, undergraduate pilot training
- 1983 Outstanding Company Grade Officer of the Year, Pacific Air Forces
- 1993 Secretary of the Air Force Leadership Award, Air War College
- 1999 Air Force Public Affairs Special Achievement for Commander Support Award

== Effective dates of promotion ==
Promotions
| Insignia | Rank | Date |
|---|---|---|
| | Lieutenant General | September 1, 2003 |
| | Major General | April 1, 2002 |
| | Brigadier General | July 1, 1999 |
| | Colonel | January 1, 1994 |
| | Lieutenant Colonel | June 1, 1988 |
| | Major | May 1, 1985 |
| | Captain | December 5, 1978 |
| | First Lieutenant | December 10, 1976 |
| | Second Lieutenant | December 10, 1974 |

== Publications ==
- 2018: “The One Thing Trump Should Ask of Kim Jong Un,” Politico
- 2018: “U.S.-North Korea summit: Meeting of minds?,” Honolulu Star-Advertiser
- 2018: “Diplomacy, sanctions, missile defense: Use this triad against North Korea,” Defense News
- 2017: “Comprehensive missile defense for the homeland,” Defense News
- 2017: “Keeping it real: Credible military options for the North Korean threat,” Defense News
- 2017: “Improve Hawai'i's Missile Defenses – Now,” Defense One
- 2017: “An Urgently Practical Approach to the Korean Peninsula,” the Oslo Forum (winner of the Forum's first-ever “Peacewriter Prize)
- 2017: “The US Army Urgently Needs a Modern Air-Defense Control System,” Defense One
- 2017: “A viable military option: Countering North Korea's weapons program,” Defense News
- 1994 "Acceptable Risk Planning Factor," Air-Land-Sea Applications Agency Bulletin
- 1993 "Unity of Command and Interdiction," Air University Press
- 1988 "The Future of Close Air Support," Military Review
- 1988 "Establishment and Evolution of Air-to-Air Weapons System Evaluation Programs," Army Command and General Staff College thesis

Military offices
| Preceded by ??? | Vice Commander of the Air Force Space Command; August 2003-September 2005 | Succeeded by Frank G. Klotz |
| Preceded by William J. Fallon | Commander of the United States Pacific Command (acting); March 12, 2007- March 26, 2007 | Succeeded by Timothy J. Keating |
