= Under Secretary of Energy for Nuclear Security =

US government position

United States Under Secretary of Energy for Nuclear Security
- Seal of the U.S. Department of Energy

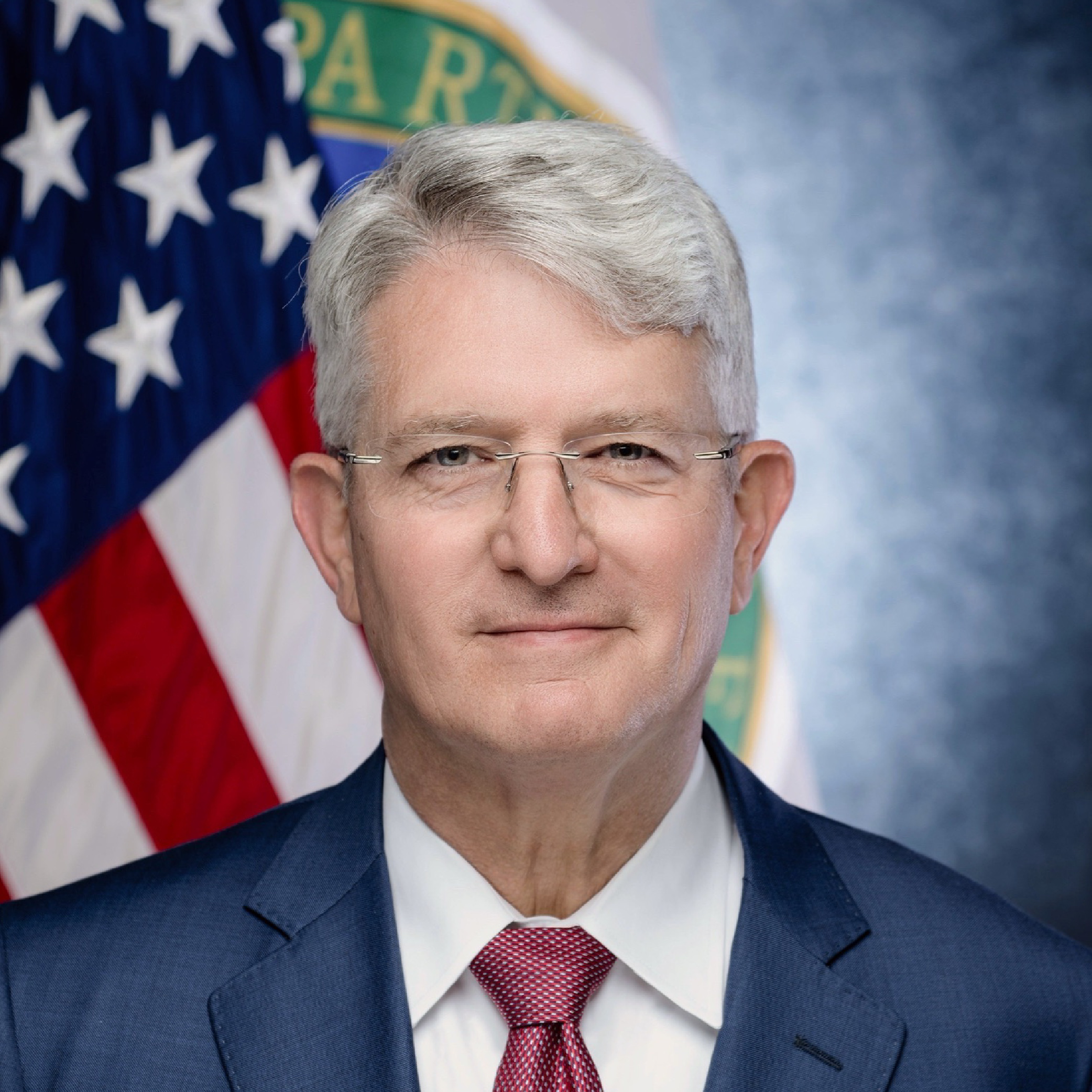
- Incumbent; Brandon Williams since September 26, 2025
- United States Department of Energy
- Style: Mr. Under Secretary
- Member of: United States Department of Energy
- Reports to: United States Deputy Secretary of Energy
- Seat: Washington, D.C., United States
- Appointer: President of the United States; with Senate advice and consent
- Term length: Appointed
- Formation: 2000
- First holder: John A. Gordon
- Website: www.energy.gov

The under secretary for nuclear security is the administrator for the National Nuclear Security Administration within the United States Department of Energy. The National Nuclear Security Administration's responsibilities include designing, producing, and maintaining safe, secure and reliable nuclear weapons for the U.S. military, providing safe, militarily effective naval nuclear propulsion plants, and promoting international nuclear safety and nonproliferation.

The under secretary for nuclear security is appointed by the president and confirmed by the Senate. The under secretary is required to have extensive background in national security, organizational management, and appropriate technical fields. The under secretary is also a member of the Nuclear Weapons Council, and is the chair of the Council when a majority votes that the issue at hand is the primary concern of the Department of Energy. The under secretary is paid at level III of the Executive Schedule.

== Officeholders ==
Under Secretary of Energy for Nuclear Security Administrator of the National Nuclear Security Administration
No.	Portrait	Name	Term start	Term end	Refs.	President(s) served under
1	John A. Gordon	John A. Gordon	June 28, 2000	June 27, 2002		Bill Clinton
1	John A. Gordon	John A. Gordon	June 28, 2000	June 27, 2002		George W. Bush
2	Linton F. Brooks	Linton Brooks	May 16, 2003	January 2006		George W. Bush
3	Tom D'Agostino	Tom D'Agostino	August 30, 2007	January 18, 2013		George W. Bush
3	Tom D'Agostino	Tom D'Agostino	August 30, 2007	January 18, 2013		Barack Obama
acting		Neile L. Miller	January 19, 2013	March 15, 2014		Barack Obama
acting		Bruce Held	March 16, 2014	April 16, 2014		Barack Obama
4	Frank Klotz	Frank Klotz	April 17, 2014	January 20, 2018		Barack Obama
4	Frank Klotz	Frank Klotz	April 17, 2014	January 20, 2018		Donald Trump
5	Lisa Gordon-Hagerty	Lisa Gordon-Hagerty	February 22, 2018	November 6, 2020		Donald Trump
acting	William Bookless	William Bookless	November 6, 2020	January 20, 2021		Donald Trump
acting		Charles P. Verdon	January 20, 2021	July 26, 2021		Joe Biden
6	Jill Hruby	Jill Hruby	July 26, 2021	January 20, 2025		Joe Biden
acting		Teresa Robbins	January 20, 2025	September 26, 2025		Donald Trump
7		Brandon Williams	September 26, 2025	Present		Donald Trump
