= John A. Gordon =

United States general (1946–2020)

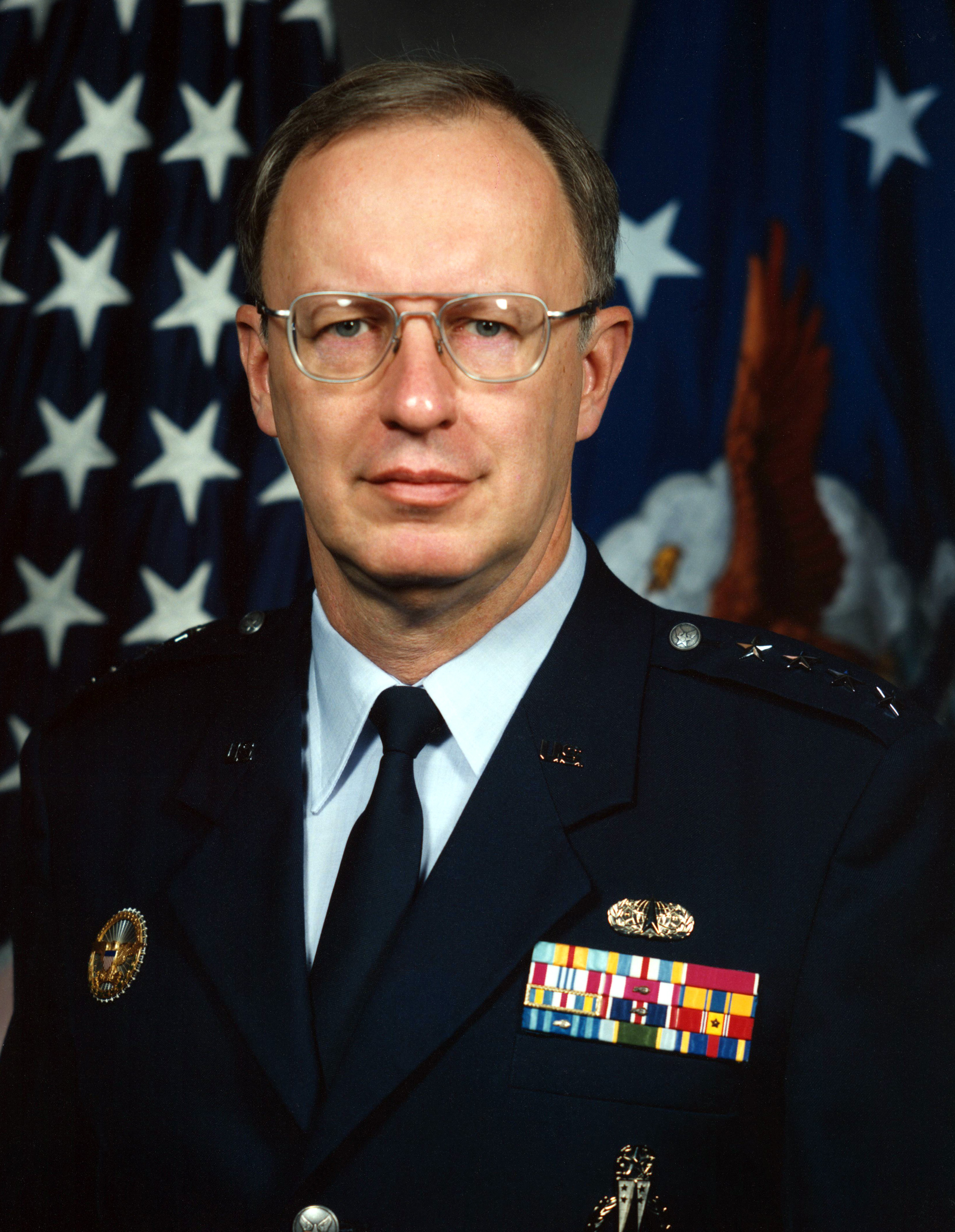

2nd United States Homeland Security Advisor
- In office April 30, 2003 – July 28, 2004
- President: George W. Bush
- Preceded by: Tom Ridge
- Succeeded by: Fran Townsend

Undersecretary of Energy for Nuclear Security
- In office June 29, 2000 – June 28, 2002
- President: Bill Clinton; George W. Bush
- Preceded by: Position established
- Succeeded by: Linton Brooks

20th Deputy Director of Central Intelligence
- In office October 31, 1997 – June 29, 2000
- President: Bill Clinton
- Preceded by: George Tenet
- Succeeded by: John McLaughlin

Personal details
- Born: John Alexander Gordon; August 22, 1946 Jefferson City, Missouri, U.S.
- Died: April 19, 2020 (aged 73) Columbia, Missouri, U.S.
- Education: University of Missouri, Columbia (BS); Naval Postgraduate School (MS); New Mexico Highlands University (MA)

Military service
- Allegiance: United States
- Branch/service: United States Air Force
- Years of service: 1968–2000
- Rank: General
- Commands: 90th Strategic Missile Wing
- Awards: Legion of Merit

John Alexander Gordon (August 22, 1946 – April 19, 2020) was an American air force general who served as Deputy Director of the Central Intelligence Agency. He also served as the President's Homeland Security advisor from 2003 to 2004.

== Military career ==
Gordon entered the Air Force through the Reserve Officer Training Corps program in 1968. His early assignments were in research, development and acquisition where he was involved in improving the Minuteman Intercontinental Ballistic Missile (ICBM) and in developing and acquiring the Peacekeeper ICBM. He was a long-range planner at Strategic Air Command and served with the U.S. State Department in the Bureau of Politico-Military Affairs. Later, he commanded the 90th Strategic Missile Wing, the only Peacekeeper ICBM unit. He has served with the National Security Council in the areas of defense and arms control, including the oversight and completion of the START II negotiations. He then became a senior member of the secretary of defense's staff and later, the director of operations, Air Force Space Command, responsible for overseeing and developing policy and guidance for the command's operational missions. He also has served as special assistant to the Air Force chief of staff for long-range planning, where he was responsible for restarting and integrating a long-range planning process into the Air Force. Prior to assuming the deputy director position, he was associate director of central intelligence for military support, Central Intelligence Agency. He retired from the Air Force on August 1, 2000.

== Post-military career ==
Following his Air Force retirement, Gordon was chosen as the first administrator of the National Nuclear Security Administration and also Under Secretary of Energy, responsible for the U.S. nuclear weapons program, a position he filled from June 2000 to June 2002. He next served as the Deputy National Security Advisor for Combating Terrorism, then assumed duties as Homeland Security Advisor from April 2003 to July 2004. On September 16, 2004, he was inducted into the Naval Postgraduate School Hall of Fame. After retiring from public service, he served on the Markle Foundation Task Force on National Security in the Information Age, as well as the board of advisors of VirtualAgility, Inc. (beginning in October 2005), the board of EDO Corporation (beginning in 2007), and the Board of Trustees of Analytic Services, Inc.

Gordon died on April 19, 2020, at the age of 73.

== Education ==
- 1968 Bachelor of Science degree in physics, with honors, University of Missouri
- 1970 Master of Science degree in physics, Naval Postgraduate School, Monterey, California
- 1972 Master of Arts degree in business administration, New Mexico Highlands University, Las Vegas
- 1975 Squadron Officer School, by correspondence
- 1978 Air Command and Staff College, by correspondence
- 1986 Air War College, Maxwell Air Force Base, Alabama

== Assignments ==
- July 1968 – June 1970, graduate student, Naval Postgraduate School, Monterey, California, and Wright-Patterson Air Force Base, Ohio
- June 1970 – June 1974, physicist, Air Force Weapons Laboratory, Kirtland Air Force Base, New Mexico
- June 1974 – April 1976, research associate, Sandia National Laboratories, Albuquerque, New Mexico
- April 1976 – February 1979, long-range planner, Headquarters Strategic Air Command, Offutt Air Force Base, Nebraska
- February 1979 – August 1980, staff officer, research and development, Headquarters U.S. Air Force, Washington, D.C.
- August 1980 – May 1982, executive assistant to the undersecretary of the Air Force, Washington, D.C.
- May 1982 – January 1983, deputy director, Office of Policy Analysis, Department of State, Washington, D.C.
- January 1983 – July 1985, office director for strategic nuclear policy, and director for defense and arms control matters, Bureau of Politico-Military Affairs, Department of State, Washington, D.C.
- July 1985 – July 1986, student, Air War College, Maxwell Air Force Base, Alabama
- July 1986 – June 1987, assistant deputy commander for maintenance, 44th Strategic Missile Wing, Ellsworth Air Force Base, South Dakota
- June 1987 – May 1989, vice commander, then commander, 90th Strategic Missile Wing, Francis E. Warren Air Force Base, Wyoming
- May 1989 – January 1993, special assistant to the president for national security affairs and senior director for defense policy and arms control, National Security Council, Washington, D.C.
- January 1993 – June 1994, deputy undersecretary of defense and chief of staff for policy, Department of Defense, Washington, D.C.
- June 1994 – September 1995, director of operations, Headquarters Air Force Space Command, Peterson Air Force Base, Colorado
- September 1995 – September 1996, special assistant to the chief of staff for long-range planning, Headquarters U.S. Air Force, Washington, D.C.
- September 1996 – October 1997, associate director of central intelligence for military support, Central Intelligence Agency, Washington, D.C.
- October 1997 – 2000, deputy director of central intelligence, Central Intelligence Agency, Washington, D.C.

== Major awards and decorations ==
- Defense Distinguished Service Medal with oak leaf cluster
- Defense Superior Service Medal
- Legion of Merit
- Defense Meritorious Service Medal
- Meritorious Service Medal with oak leaf cluster
- Air Force Commendation Medal

== Effective dates of promotion ==
- Second Lieutenant June 4, 1968
- First Lieutenant December 4, 1969
- Captain June 4, 1971
- Major September 1, 1979
- Lieutenant Colonel November 1, 1981
- Colonel December 1, 1985
- Brigadier General June 1, 1992
- Major General May 25, 1995
- Lieutenant General September 20, 1996
- General October 31, 1997

Government offices
Preceded by George Tenet	Deputy Director of Central Intelligence; 1997–2000	Succeeded by John McLaughlin
Political offices
New office	Undersecretary of Energy for Nuclear Security; 2000–2002	Succeeded by Linton Brooks
Preceded by Tom Ridge	United States Homeland Security Advisor; 2003–2004	Succeeded by Fran Townsend
