= Lisa Gordon-Hagerty =

American civil servant

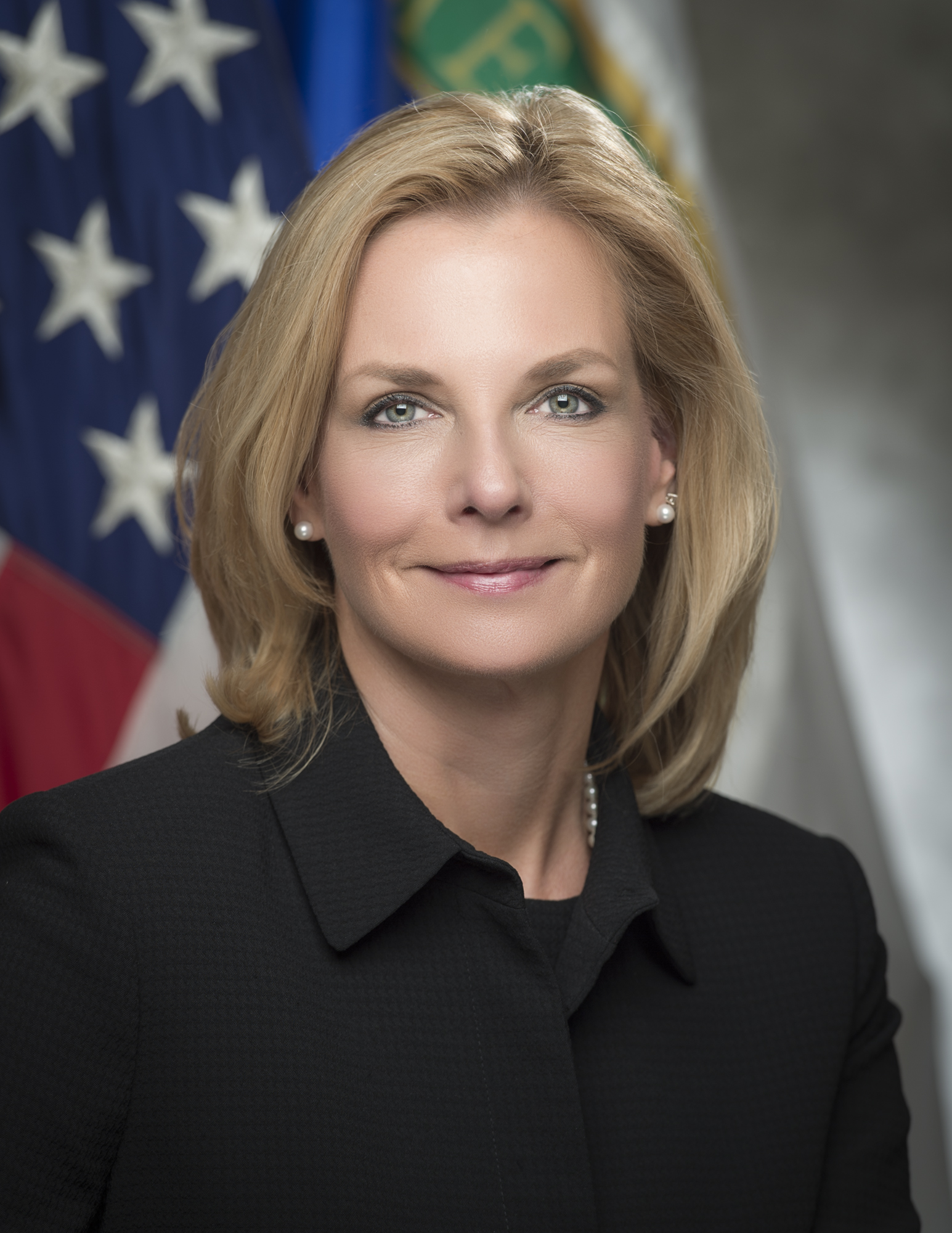

Under Secretary of Energy for Nuclear Security
- In office February 22, 2018 – November 6, 2020
- President: Donald Trump
- Preceded by: Frank Klotz
- Succeeded by: Jill Hruby

Administrator of the National Nuclear Security Administration
- In office February 22, 2018 – November 6, 2020
- President: Donald Trump
- Preceded by: Frank Klotz
- Succeeded by: Jill Hruby

Personal details
- Education: University of Michigan (BS, MPH)

Lisa Ellen Gordon-Hagerty is an American scientist and former government official who served as the under secretary of energy for nuclear security and administrator of the National Nuclear Security Administration. Earlier in her career, she had served in various other leadership positions in the Department of Energy and the National Security Council.

== Education ==
Gordon-Hagerty graduated from the University of Michigan with a Bachelor of Science in 1983 and a Master of Public Health in health physics in 1986. During her graduate studies, she worked at the Department of Energy's Savannah River Site.

== Career ==
After graduation, she worked at Lawrence Livermore National Laboratory. She then moved to Washington, D.C., to join the staff of the United States House Committee on Energy and Commerce.

She then spent six years in the Department of Energy as the director of the Office of Emergency Response and acting director of the Office of Weapons Surety. As director of the Office of Emergency Response, she had authority to activate the Nuclear Emergency Search Team, which led The Washington Times to compare her to a "female James Bond".

In July 1998, she became director of the White House Office of Combating Terrorism under the National Security Council. She was appointed during the Clinton administration and remained in the position into the Bush administration. She was closely involved in its response to the September 11 attacks, and was present in the White House compound during the attacks.

She then served in several positions in the private sector. From 2003 to 2005, she was executive vice president and COO of United States Enrichment Corporation. She then was president of consulting firm Tier Tech International and president and CEO of consulting firm LEG. She was named to Fortune magazine's Most Powerful Women in 2004, 2005 and 2006. She also served on the board of experts for the Federation of American Scientists.

Gordon-Hagerty was appointed by President Donald Trump as under secretary of energy for nuclear security and administrator of the National Nuclear Security Administration, confirmed by the U.S. Senate on February 15, 2018 and was sworn in on February 22, 2018. In September 2019, she was named as one of five finalists for national security advisor after the resignation of John Bolton, although the position ultimately went to Robert C. O'Brien. On November 6, 2020, she resigned from her positions, reportedly due to longstanding tensions and disagreements with Secretary of Energy Dan Brouillette. In December 2020, it was announced that Gordon-Hagerty would be appointed to the Defense Policy Board Advisory Committee. Gordon-Hagerty has been appointed to the board of directors of Visible Assets as of March 2021.

In April 2026, Gordon-Hagerty was elected to RAND's Board of Trustees.

== Personal life ==
During a congressional committee hearing, Representative Curt Weldon compared Gordon-Hagerty to a character in the 1997 thriller The Peacemaker, a counterterrorism director portrayed by Nicole Kidman. She was reportedly underwhelmed by this, quoted as jokingly saying "I have more important things to do than advise Nicole Kidman."

In 2007, she married Walter Houston, the founder and CEO of Tier Tech International.
