= Federal Protective Forces =

U.S. Department of Energy law enforcement and security agency

- DOE-FPF
- Custom-Made Contractor Seal of the United States Department of Energy Federal Protective Forces
- Founded: 1950; 76 years ago
- Country: United States
- Type: Security police
- Role: Protection of Category I special nuclear material
- Size: 2,715 (as of 2007)
- Part of: U.S. Department of Energy Office of Environmental Management; National Nuclear Security Administration
- Nickname: ProFor
- Motto: Semper Vigil ("Always Watchful")
- Website: nnsa.energy.gov energy.gov

Commanders
- Chief, Defense Nuclear Security (CDNS): Jeffrey Johnson

The Federal Protective Forces (FPF; also known as the Protective Forces or ProFor) are the law enforcement agencies of the United States Department of Energy (DOE) responsible for the protection of Category I special nuclear material. Officially classified as security police, they hold law enforcement status (under section 161k of the Atomic Energy Act of 1954) while engaged in the performance of official duties. Officers are equipped and trained to respond to serious incidents at Department of Energy facilities by armed adversaries and to reacquire stolen nuclear material. The FPFs have been described by the DOE as "elite fighting forces" designed to operate in "combat environments".

== Background ==
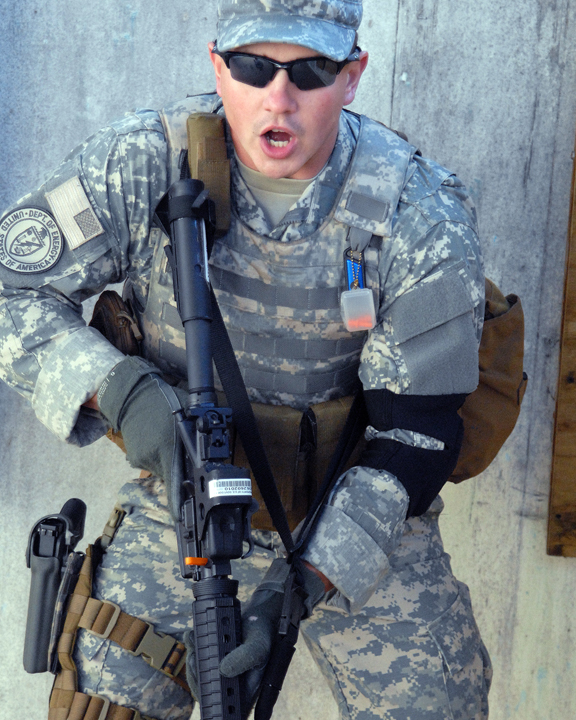
A Protective Forces member with an M4 carbine training at the Savannah River Site in 2008

The Federal Protective Forces are responsible for defending Department of Energy sites at which Category I special material is stored. This generally includes uranium-235, uranium-233, and plutonium-239 in certain formulations. Under the provisions of the Atomic Energy Act of 1954, Protective Forces personnel have been granted limited arrest authority; they may make probable cause arrests while on-duty and for a specific series of federal crimes related to nuclear material and government property.

The Federal Protective Forces are heavily armed, which is reflective of the anticipated capabilities of an adversary likely to attempt an assault against a Category I material-holding site. The current hypothetical adversary against which Protective Forces prepare is described in a 2004 Design Basis Threat (DBT) issued by the Department of Energy. Though the DBT is classified, the hypothetical adversary has been generally described as a "larger" force that would seek to overrun the defenses of a DOE facility in order to capture Category I special material. Department of Energy studies have indicated that up to 50 percent of a Protective Forces detachment would be killed responding to some variations of the threat envisaged. The size of individual Protective Forces detachments ranged, in 2007, from between 233 and 533 personnel per protected site.

== Operations ==
=== Organization ===
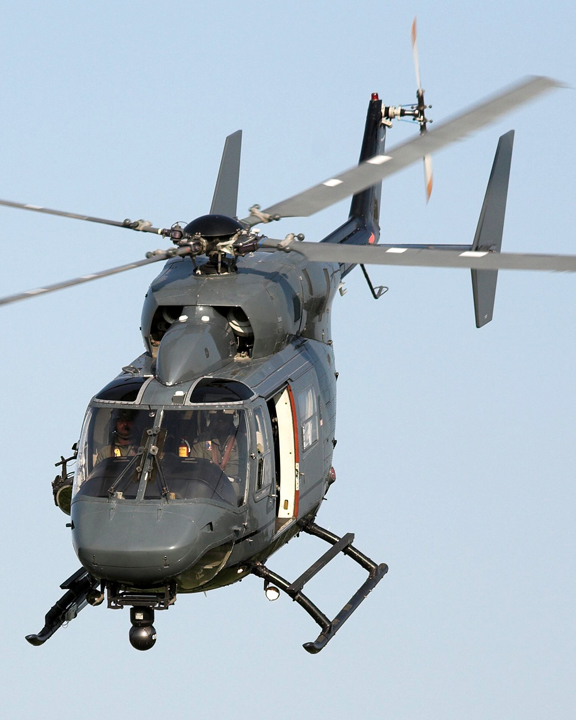
A Protective Forces helicopter operating at the Savannah River Site in 2006

The Protective Forces are recruited and employed by private companies, yet are trained, equipped, and under the operational command of Defense Nuclear Security, a program of the Department of Energy's National Nuclear Security Administration (two Protective Forces, those at the Savannah River Site and the Idaho National Laboratory, are under the control of the DOE's Office of Environmental Management). Each Department of Energy site housing a Protective Forces contingent contracts with a different company for manpower.

Protective Forces are sited at eight Department of Energy facilities:

- Hanford Site
- Idaho National Laboratory
- Lawrence Livermore National Laboratory
- Los Alamos National Laboratory
- Nevada National Security Site
- Pantex Plant
- Savannah River Site
- Y-12 National Security Complex
- Honeywell FM&T Kansas City

=== Equipment ===
Protective Forces employ a variety of weaponry including the SR-25 rifle, HK69 grenade launcher, and Mk 19 grenade launcher. In the mid-2000s, Protective Forces began to acquire and deploy M134 miniguns. These are mounted on the Lenco BearCat armored personnel carriers used by the Protective Forces, as well as static gun emplacements at Department of Energy facilities.

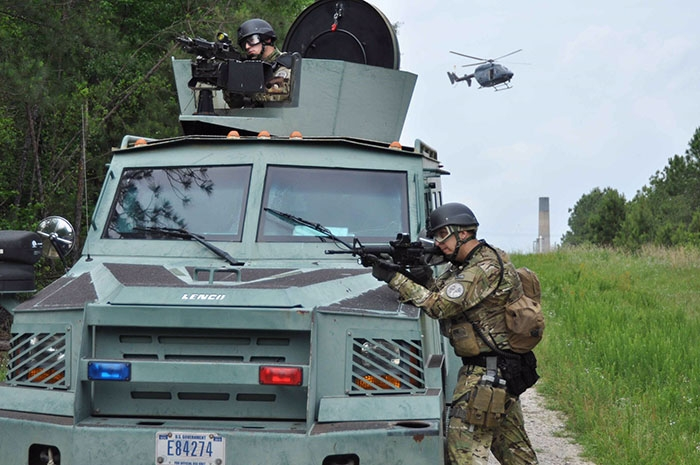
Protective Forces operating from a Lenco BearCat at the Savannah River Site

Protective Forces are equipped with more than 80 Lenco BearCat armored personnel carriers system-wide, and also use the Polaris 500 ATV and a variety of soft-shelled vehicles.

Prior to 2010, Protective Forces uniforms varied from site to site. That year, the NNSA adopted a mandatory, system-wide uniform. The NNSA estimated the standardized uniform would save the Department of Energy $500,000 over eight years due to bulk purchase savings, as well as "promote solidarity" among the disparate Protective Forces.

=== Training ===
The Protective Forces are trained at the Department of Energy's National Training Center in Albuquerque, New Mexico, with some specialized training occurring at the Y-12 National Security Complex in Oak Ridge, Tennessee.

The Department of Energy organizes 26-man Composite Adversary Teams (CAT) that probe Protective Forces-secured sites to identify weaknesses and test the preparedness of Protective Forces units in responding to an attack. CAT members are drawn from the regular Protective Forces for rotating, one-to-two week opposing force assignments overseen by a dedicated, 12-man training nucleus.

== Key issues ==
=== Incidents ===
==== Mid-2000s Pantex issues ====
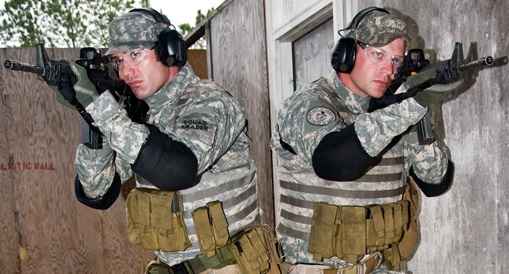
Protective Forces pictured at the Savannah River Site in 2008

In 2006 the Department of Energy Inspector General received complaints from inside the Pantex Plant that Protective Forces were not being issued the correct night-vision equipment to safely operate their Mk 19 grenade launchers, a complaint it later substantiated after an investigation, though the NNSA rejected the report's findings.

The following year, 524 members of the Protective Forces detachment at Pantex, whose personnel were provided by BWX Technologies, went on strike in protest of the Department of Energy's decision to revise the pension and medical benefits it provided to contractors. During the 44-day strike, a 210-man replacement force, composed of supervisors and non-unionized personnel assigned to other Department of Energy sites, was assembled to secure Pantex. Both the National Council of Security Police, the union for Protective Forces personnel, and the Project on Government Oversight called for Pantex to be shut down during the dispute due to what was claimed to be a serious erosion of the security of nuclear weapons stored at the facility. The Department of Energy rejected claims that the security of nuclear material was compromised during the strike.

==== Y-12 security breach ====
In July 2012, three activists from the Plowshares movement were able to briefly gain entry to the Y-12 National Security Complex. According to officials, the breach was the first time in the 70-year history of Y-12 that its perimeter had been successfully penetrated, shattering what had been described as an "aura of invincibility". 60 days later, the DOE terminated the contract of WSI (formerly Wackenhut and later a subsidiary of G4S), which had provided FPFs to Y-12 for more than a decade. The contract for FPFs at Y-12 was subsequently awarded to National Strategic Protective Services, a joint venture of Securiguard and Triple Canopy.

=== Future concerns ===
==== Federalization ====
The Natural Resources Defense Council has called for the Protective Forces to be fully federalized, arguing that a non-federalized force may have less willingness to "stay and fight" against a very committed adversary able to inflict heavy casualties. Representatives of Protective Forces personnel have also called for the forces to be federalized.

Federalization has been opposed by the Department of Energy. The International Union of Security, Police, and Fire Professionals of America also oppose federalization, noting that a federalized force would no longer be able to participate in collective bargaining or other union activities.

==== Risk to civilian populations ====
Some have called for Category I material-holding sites located near populated areas to be moved to more remote regions due to the threat of heavy civilian deaths that could be incidentally inflicted by the Protective Forces while defending a site from attack. For instance, a neighborhood sits within the 1.5-mile (2.4 km) range of the Lawrence Livermore Laboratory's M134 gun emplacements, creating the potential that "children at play, joggers and families working in their yards" could be struck by stray bullets from Federal Protective Forces if an attack originated from their direction.

An NNSA study noted that the level of force and types of weaponry the Protective Forces would deploy in pursuit of an adversary which had seized nuclear material and moved it off-site may produce heavy "collateral non-combatant casualties" during a recapture operation.

== SPOTC ==
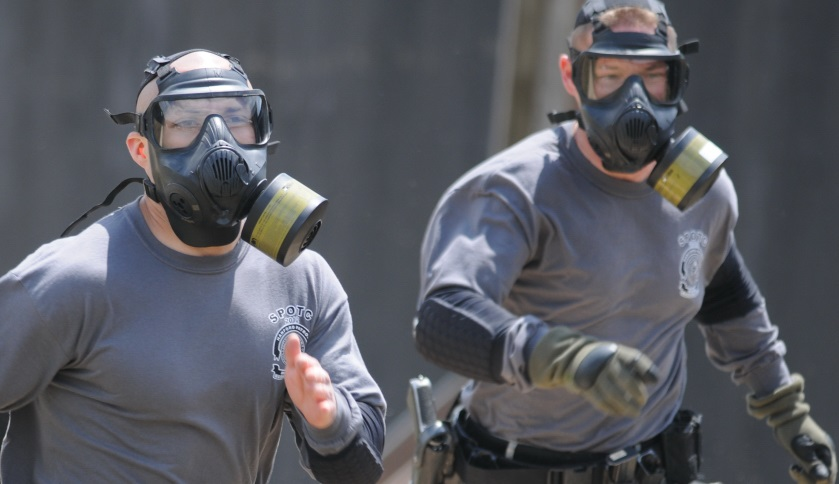
Protective Forces personnel running an obstacle course while wearing CBRN masks at SPOTC 2012 in South Carolina

Since 1972, the Department of Energy, and its predecessor agencies, have organized the annual Security Police Officer Training Competition (SPOTC), a tactical contest pitting nuclear security units against each other. In addition to the Federal Protective Forces, external teams have been invited from the U.S. armed forces. In 2001, the first international teams entered, with a contingent representing the United Kingdom's Atomic Energy Authority.

== See also ==
- Nuclear Emergency Support Team
- Safeguards Transporter
- Office of Secure Transportation
- Civil Nuclear Constabulary (British equivalent)
