= Safeguards Transporter =

Truck for transporting nuclear weapons within the United States

Safeguards Transporter (SGT)
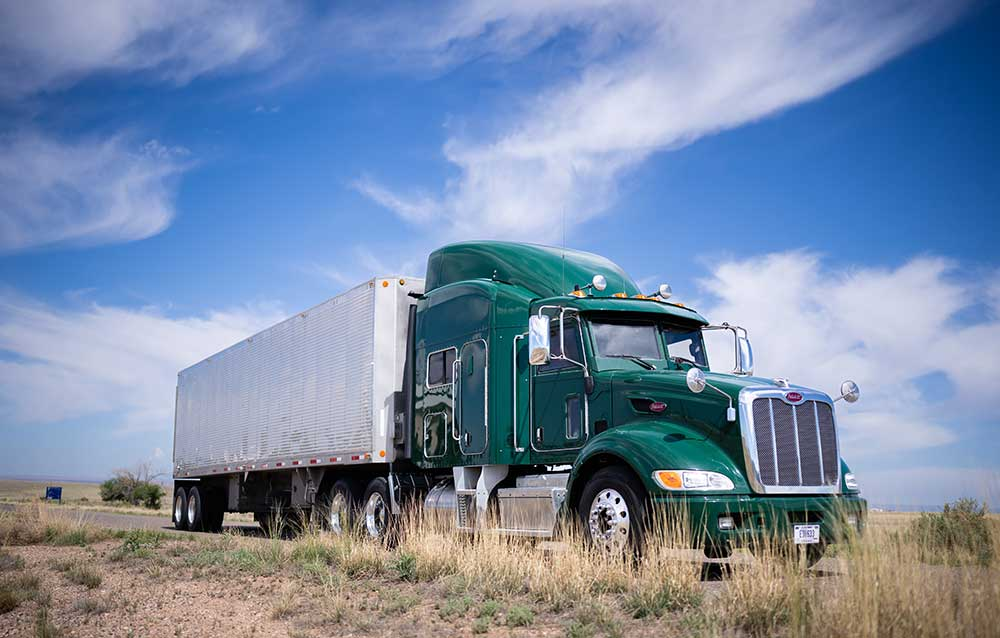
- Peterbilt 386 Safeguards Transporter retrofitted with Integrated Surety Architecture hardware.

Overview
- Designer: Sandia National Laboratories

Body and chassis
- Body style: Truck
- Platform: Peterbilt

A Safeguards Transporter (SGT) is a semi-trailer truck developed by Sandia National Laboratories for use by the United States Department of Energy's National Nuclear Security Administration (NNSA) in the ground transport of nuclear weapons in the contiguous United States. SGTs combine modified Peterbilt trucks and custom-built trailers known as Safe Secure Trailers (SST).

== History ==
The Safeguards Transporters and Safe Secure Trailers were designed by the Sandia National Laboratories and built on the frame of commercial Peterbilt 18-wheel tractor trailers in about 2000. The Safeguards Transporters replaced what was later revealed to have been the first generation of Department of Energy nuclear weapons carriers.

While the number of Safeguards Transporters in operation is not published, in 2006 the NNSA said it hoped to increase the fleet to 37.

Sandia was, as of 2016, in the early design process of a new generation of nuclear weapons carriers known as the Mobile Guardian Transporter.

== Design and features ==
SGTs, and the Safe Secure Trailers (SSTs) they tow, are described by the NNSA as "technologically advanced vehicles" that have the capability to safely withstand punishing highway accidents and keep cargo safe in the event of complete immolation of the vehicle. If a SGT comes under attack, unspecified security features in the vehicles give them, according to the NNSA, the capability to "surprise and delay even the most aggressive adversary". The full range of defensive components in SGTs is classified, but according to some media reports the vehicles are equipped with autonomous weapons systems and other "high-tech surprises" that allow them to independently engage and repel attackers even if all human crew have been killed or disabled. The NNSA has also stated that access to nuclear weapons held within a SST is not possible, even for crew members, due to unspecified security features that prevent the doors from being opened except in "an approved security area".

To frustrate easy identification of nuclear weapons convoys and deter potential hijack or attack, SGTs do not display any unique livery or other markings, and are purpose-built to mirror the appearance of civilian tractor-trailers.

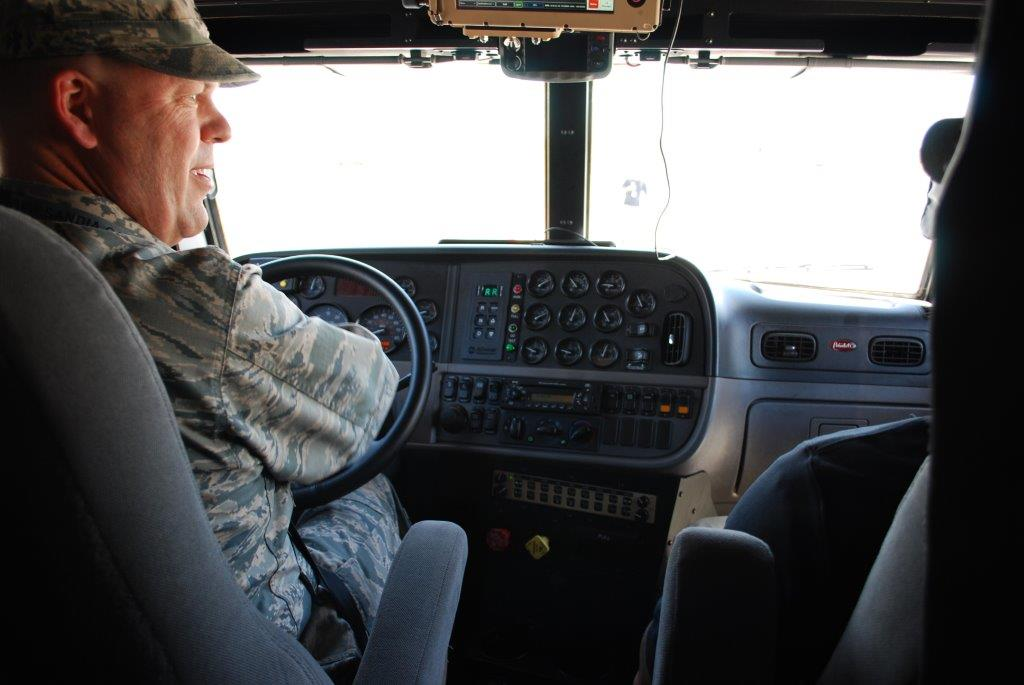
Brigadier General Stephen L. Davis of the Department of Energy's National Nuclear Security Administration, test drives a Safeguards Transporter in 2015.

When traveling, the tractor and trailer are typically escorted by three dark colored Chevrolet Suburbans, each containing four armed crew members. Additionally, all missions include heavily armed aerial support. The semi-tractor itself is heavily armored, and equipped with a Caterpillar diesel engine coupled to an automatic transmission. The tractor has a sleeper, but instead of a bed, it has two seats containing additional armed support crew. The tractor also contains firing ports, run flat tires, and automatic sanders for slick roads.

The tractor and support vehicles are in constant contact with their dispatch, including real-time video streams of their journey. Local law enforcement is typically informed of a "special mission" coming through their sector, although they may not be informed as to the specifics of the mission.

The transport trailer (SST) is the width of a standard trailer (96 inches or 8 feet). While the trailer appears conventional from the outside, the back doors are over 12" thick, and an average-sized male can put their arms out from their sides and lay their palms flat against the wall. There are three sets of nozzles coming out of the ceiling. One nozzle purges the air out, the other nozzle fills the trailer with a noxious chemical to disable an attacker. This system can be activated from the cab of the truck, by any one of the escort teams (each vehicle is a team), or from dispatch. Finally there is an inclinometer - if the trailer becomes off level by a certain degree, the entire inside of the trailer is filled with expanding, fast-hardening foam.

== Procedures and operation ==
SGTs are operated by armed employees of the NNSA who are "authorized to use deadly force" to prevent attempts to access the vehicle, and are typically escorted by a fleet of other unmarked vehicles mounting armed NNSA personnel. According to the NNSA, SGTs avoid travel in inclement weather; in the event adverse weather conditions are encountered en route to a destination, SGTs can seek shelter in previously identified, secure roadside facilities.

The movement of SGTs on highways is monitored from a dispatch center in Albuquerque, New Mexico known as the Transportation and Emergency Control Center (TECC). In the event of an attack on a SGT, the TECC makes contact with predesignated state law enforcement agencies to assist in the defense of the vehicle. Due to the possibility that an armed attack can involve enemies disguised as police officers or military personnel, a "sign-countersign" system is utilized ; the TECC provides "countersigns" to responders which they are required to use to signal NNSA defenders when approaching a SGT that is under attack. The NNSA has advised local law enforcement to "take cover" in the event they signal an incorrect countersign to NNSA personnel when attempting to provide aid during a threat incident.

== Photos of vehicles ==
Until 2009 only one known, publicly available photo of a Safeguards Transporter existed, which was shot in 2005 by a private photographer as the vehicle was departing a naval station in South Carolina. In 2009 Friends of the Earth obtained two additional photos through a Freedom of Information Act request.

== See also ==
- Ground-Mobile Command Center – Truck convoy usable by the U.S. President as headquarters during nuclear war
- White Train – American armored train used to transport nuclear weapons during the Cold War
