= LegiStorm =

U.S. website

LegiStorm is a website and research organization known for posting salaries and personal information on politicians and political staffers.

== History ==
It was founded in the fall of 2006 by Jock Friedly. At the time, it operated out of an old school building on the outskirts of the Capitol Hill neighborhood. The website offers a subscription tier called LegiStorm Pro.

In 2008, LegiStorm began posting the financial disclosures of congressional staff prompting some concern about the release of sensitive personal information. In response, the United States House of Representatives paid LegiStorm US$3,100 (equivalent to $4,527 in 2024) to cover the cost of redacting certain details including home addresses and personal signatures from the disclosures of its staff.

Some congressional staffers have criticized the website. In 2013, the website began using the StormFeed tool to post the personal Twitter accounts.
