= National Nuclear Security Administration =

United States federal government agency

Agency overview
- Formed: 2000
- Headquarters: James V. Forrestal Building 1000 Independence Avenue SW Washington, D.C., U.S.
- Employees: 2,600+ federal (2024), 65,000 contract (2024)
- Annual budget: $22.2 billion (FY24)
- Agency executive: Brandon Williams, Under Secretary of Energy for Nuclear Security, NNSA Administrator
- Parent agency: Department of Energy
- Key document: 50 U.S.C. ch. 41
- Website: www.energy.gov/nnsa/national-nuclear-security-administration

The National Nuclear Security Administration (NNSA) is a United States federal agency responsible for safeguarding national security through the military application of nuclear science. NNSA maintains and enhances the safety, security, and effectiveness of the U.S. nuclear weapons stockpile; works to reduce the global danger from weapons of mass destruction; provides the United States Navy with safe and effective nuclear propulsion; and responds to nuclear and radiological emergencies in the United States and abroad.

Established by the United States Congress in 2000, NNSA is a semiautonomous agency within the United States Department of Energy.

== History ==
NNSA was created by congressional action in 1999, in the wake of the Wen Ho Lee spy scandal and allegations that direct management by the Department of Energy had resulted in U.S. nuclear secrets being leaked to China. Originally proposed to be independent, it was instead chartered as a semiautonomous agency within the Department of Energy to be headed by an administrator reporting to the secretary of energy. The first under secretary for nuclear security and NNSA administrator appointed was Air Force General (and CIA deputy director) John A. Gordon.

In 2006, NNSA's administrator took responsibility when employee information was hacked.

In February 2025, CNN reported that the Trump administration had fired 300 NNSA employees, while the Department of Energy responded that "less than 50 people" had been fired, and that the fired employees "held primarily administrative and clerical roles". The next day, the Trump administration informed NNSA that "termination letters for some NNSA probationary employees are being rescinded, but we do not have a good way to get in touch with those personnel", since the fired employees had been blocked from their federal government email accounts, so the Trump administration asked NNSA to forward the notice to the fired employees' personal email accounts.

In July 2025, some NNSA systems were reported to have been breached by Chinese state-sponsored advanced persistent threat groups dubbed Linen Typhoon, Violet Typhoon and Storm-2603.

== Mission and operations ==
NNSA has the following missions with regard to national security:

- To manage the U.S. nuclear weapons stockpile.
- To reduce global danger from weapons of mass destruction and to promote international nuclear safety and nonproliferation.
- To provide the United States Navy with safe, militarily effective nuclear propulsion plants and to ensure the safe and reliable operation of those plants.

=== Defense programs ===
One of NNSA's primary missions is to maintain the safety, security and effectiveness of the United States' nuclear weapons stockpile. After the Cold War, the U.S. voluntarily ended underground nuclear testing. NNSA maintains the existing nuclear deterrent through the use of science experiments, engineering audits and high-tech simulations at its three national laboratories: Los Alamos National Laboratory, Lawrence Livermore National Laboratory, and Sandia National Laboratories. It also creates new weapons programs as required by the United States Department of Defense.

NNSA assets used to maintain and ensure the effectiveness of the American nuclear weapons stockpile include the Dual-Axis Radiographic Hydrodynamic Test Facility (DARHT) at Los Alamos National Laboratory, the Contained Firing Facility at Lawrence Livermore National Laboratory and the Z Machine at Sandia National Laboratories. NNSA also uses powerful supercomputers to run simulations and validate experimental data; these computers often appear on the Top500 list. In fact, LLNL's El Capitan is the fastest supercomputer in the world.

==== National Ignition Facility ====
Another important asset used to test the stockpile is the National Ignition Facility (NIF) at LLNL, a laser-based inertial confinement fusion research device. NIF achieved the first scientific breakeven controlled fusion experiment on December 5, 2022, with an energy gain factor of 1.5. Since then, the feat has been accomplished many more times.

==== Office of Secure Transportation ====
The Office of Secure Transportation provides safe and secure transportation of nuclear weapons and components and special nuclear materials, and conducts other missions supporting national security. OST shipments are moved in specially designed equipment and escorted by armed and specially trained federal agents.

=== Nonproliferation ===
NNSA's Office of Defense Nuclear Nonproliferation works with international partners, federal agencies, U.S. national laboratories, and the private sector to discover, protect, and or dispose of radiological and nuclear materials.

The office strives to:

- Extract, dispose, and reduce the materials used in the proliferation of nuclear arms
- Protect technology, materials, and the facilities used to store such materials and technology
- Track the spread of nuclear materials, expertise, and the technological knowledge associated with the creation of nuclear weapons
- Conduct research and development for solutions to mitigate the spread of nuclear materials, and the application of protective measures
- Develop policy solutions and develop programs to reduce nuclear and radiological dangers.

==== Removals and more ====
The agency created the Global Threat Reduction Initiative in 2004 to expand efforts similar to the Cooperative Threat Reduction program beyond the former Soviet Union.

In 2016, GTRI was renamed the Office of Materials Management and Minimization, and continues the efforts of supporting reactor conversions, fuel returns, and LEU fuel development.

The work of the Office of Materials Management and Minimization is divided into three subprograms: Conversion, Nuclear Materials Removal, and Material Disposition.

Through this office and its predecessors, NNSA has successfully led the recovery efforts of nuclear materials from dozens of countries. Since 1996, the Department of Energy/NNSA has disposed of enough material to produce more than 325 nuclear weapons.

For example, in 2017, it removed all the highly enriched uranium from Ghana and repatriated it to China. The Ghanaian reactor now uses low-enriched uranium.

==== Counterterrorism and counterproliferation ====
NNSA's Office of Counterterrorism and Counterproliferation focuses on:

- Radiological search – searching for radiological materials as well as identifying them.
- Rendering safe – comprehensive evaluation of radioactive materials and or nuclear device if such a device is found, to ensure safety.
- Consequence management – analysis of the spread of radioactive materials if such an incident were to occur.

The office oversees the capabilities of the Nuclear Emergency Support Team.

NNSA deploys response teams dozens of times each year, usually to check for radioactive materials. Missions assuage safety concerns, support other agencies, and bolster law enforcement capabilities at large public events such as presidential inaugurations and the Super Bowl.

NNSA provides expertise, tools and technically informed policy recommendations to advance U.S. nuclear counterterrorism and counterproliferation objectives. It is responsible for understanding nuclear threat devices and foreign activities that cause proliferation concerns. To do this, members of the counterproliferation office confer with international counterparts on nuclear security and counterterrorism; conduct scientific research to characterize, detect and defeat nuclear threat devices; develop and conduct WMD counterterrorism exercises; and promote nuclear information security policy and practices.

=== Naval reactors ===
NNSA's Nuclear Propulsion Program – working with Naval Nuclear Laboratories – is responsible for providing efficient nuclear propulsion plants to the United States Navy. It is also known as Naval Reactors. It conducts the design, development and operational support required to power all the U.S. Navy's aircraft carriers and nuclear submarines. The program consists of both civilian and military personnel who maintain, design, build, and manage the reactors.

The following are the elements of the program:

- Research and development to support currently operational laboratories
- Skilled contractors who design and build propulsion plant equipment
- Shipyards that service, repair and build nuclear powered ships
- Facilities to support the U.S. Navy
- Training facilities for Naval Reactors and Nuclear Power schools
- Various field offices and the Naval Nuclear Propulsion Program Headquarters

=== Mission support offices ===
NNSA has several offices that support its primary missions. Among them are:

==== Emergency operations ====
NNSA's Office of Emergency Operations has the obligation of responding to emergencies on behalf of the entire Department of Energy. Its high level of alertness allows the United States to respond to incidents in a rapid manner.

==== Defense Nuclear Security ====
NNSA's Office of Defense Nuclear Security is responsible for the overall security of facilities housing nuclear weapons as well as the components and materials required to develop them – this includes oversight of Federal Protective Forces – contractors who safeguard NNSA's labs, plants, and sites. The office also safeguards personnel and produces threat assessments.

== Facilities ==
=== NNSA-owned facilities ===
- Laboratories
  - Lawrence Livermore National Laboratory
  - Los Alamos National Laboratory
  - Sandia National Laboratories
  - Savannah River National Laboratory
- Plants
  - Kansas City National Security Campus
  - Pantex Plant
  - Y-12 National Security Complex
- Sites
  - Nevada National Security Site
  - Savannah River Site

=== Facilities not owned by NNSA but largely funded by it ===
- Pacific Northwest National Laboratory
