= List of CIA station chiefs =

The station chief, also called chief of station (COS), is the top U.S. Central Intelligence Agency official stationed in a foreign country, equivalent to a KGB Resident. Often the COS has an office in the American Embassy. The station chief is the senior U.S. intelligence representative with his or her respective foreign government.

Those who have been known to be station chiefs include, in alphabetical order:

Name	Location	Years	Notes
Frank Anderson	Beirut	until 1994	Chief of Near East and South Asia Division
Edgar Applewhite	Beirut	c. 1959	
Francis "Frank" Archibald	Islamabad	c. 2007	
Daniel C. Arnold	Vientiane	beginning in May 1973;	Taipei, assumed in 1968; Bangkok, left June 30, 1979
Jonathan Bank	Islamabad	c. 2010	
Milton Bearden	Pakistan; Nigeria; Sudan; Germany	c. 1986–1995	
John D. Bennett	Islamabad	2008–2009	N'Djamena; Nairobi c. 2002
Cofer Black	Cape Town	c. 1985;	Khartoum Sudan 1993–1995
Douglas Blaufarb	Vientiane, Laos	1964–1966	
David Blee	Pretoria; Islamabad; New Delhi	1965	
Janine Brookner	Kingston, Jamaica	1989–1991	
William Buckley	Beirut	1983–1985	
Jim Campbell	Venezuela	c. 1989	
Jeffrey Castelli	Rome	2003	Indicted for involvement in the Imam rapito affair
Ray S. Cline	Taipei	1958–1962;	Bonn, 1966–1969
Charles Cogan	Paris	1984–1989	
William Colby	Rome	1953–1958	Saigon, 1960–1962; Head of the Far Eastern Division, 1963–1967; DCI, 1973–1976
Michael D'Andrea	Cairo	c. 2002–2004	Chief of Counter Terrorist Center, 2006–2015
Peer de Silva	Vienna	1956–1959	Seoul, 1959–1962; Hong Kong, 1962–1963; Saigon, 1963–1965; Bangkok, 1966–1968; Canberra, 1971–1972
Jack Devine	London	1995–1998	Rome, c. 1980s; Chief of Latin America Division, 1992–1994
Larry Devlin	Congo	1960–1961	Vientiane, Laos
Jack G. Downing	Moscow	1986–1989	Beijing c. 1991
William Duggan	Taipei	1954–1958	under the title of: Chief of U.S. Naval Auxiliary Communications Center (NACC)
Wm. H. Dunbar	Bangui (Central African Republic)	1968–1969	
Ron Estes	Prague	1965–1967	Madrid 1979
Joseph F. Fernandez	Costa Rica	1985–1986	Indicted (charges were dropped in the Iran–Contra Scandal, 1988–1989)
Desmond FitzGerald	Manila	1955–1956	
Harold P. Ford	Taipei	1965–1968	NACC Taipei reorganized as U.S. Army Technical Group
David Forden	Athens	1984–1986	
Graham Fuller	Kabul	c. 1980–1981	
Robert Fulton	Moscow	1975–1977	
Clair George	Athens	c. 1976–1979	
Burton Gerber	Moscow	1980–1982	
Robert L. Grenier	Algiers	c. 1990	Islamabad 1999–2001
Jerry "Jay" Gruner	Geneva, then Paris	1986–1988, 1989–1993	
Howard Hart	Islamabad	1981–1984	Tehran 1978; Germany
John L. Hart	Saigon	c. 1965, c. 1966	
Gina Haspel	Azerbaijan	c. 1996–1998	London, c. 2008–2011, 2014–2017
Gardner Hathaway	Moscow	1977–1980	
Paul B. Henze	Ankara; Addis Ababa	1960s or 1970s	
Dick Holm	Paris	1992–1995	Brussels, 1985–1988
Stephen Holmes (aka Steven Hall)	Moscow	2013	Revealed by FSB in retaliation for Ryan Fogle's activities
Robert Jantzen	Bangkok	c. 1959–1966	
Gordon L. Jorgensen	Laos	c. 1960	Saigon, 1966 – c. 1968
George Kalaris	Brazil	c. 1972	
Robert Kandra	Baghdad	c. 2006	
Stephen Kappes	Moscow	1996–1999	New Delhi; Frankfurt
Barry Kelly	Moscow	c. 1977?	Subsequently moved to the Directorate of Science and Technology as head of the Office of SIGINT Operations. Negotiated a merger of NSA and CIA covert signals intelligence operations into the Special Collection Service.
Mark Kelton	Islamabad	2010–2011	
Paul Kolbe	Moscow	c. 2004–2006	Chief of Central Eurasian Division, 2007–2009
Andrew Kim	Seoul		
John Lapham	Saigon	c. 1966	
James Lawler	Zurich	c. 1991–1994	
Jennifer Matthews	Khost	2009	Killed in the Camp Chapman attack (Chief of Base, not COS)
Stuart Methven	Kinshasa	1975	
Hendrik Van Der Meulen	Amman	c. 2002	
Cord Meyer	London	1973–1976	
Gerry Meyer			Baghdad, around August 2003 to January 2004
William Lyle Moseby	C.A.R. (Bangui)	c. 1980	
Rolf Mowatt-Larssen	Moscow	c. 1994, 2000	
David Murphy	Berlin	1959	Paris, 1967
Bill Murray	Paris	2001–2004	
Herbert W. Natzke	Philippines	c. 1979	
William Nelson	Taipei	1962–1965	
William Ross Newland III	Buenos Aires	c. 2000–2001	
Duyane Norman	Brazil	2017	
Birch O'Neal	Guatemala	1953	
Craig P. Osth	Rio de Janeiro	c. 1999	Islamabad, c. 2013
Eloise Page	Athens	1970s	First female station chief
Richard L. Palmer	Moscow	1992–1994	
James Pavitt	Luxembourg	1983–1986	
David Atlee Phillips	Santo Domingo	1965–1967	Brasília 1970–1972
Henry Pleasants	Bern	1950–1956	Bonn, Germany, 1956–1964
Thomas Polgar	Frankfurt	1949	Saigon, 1972–1975
Phillip F. Reilly	Kabul	c. 2003	Manila, c. 2008
Robert Richer	Amman	c. 2000	2002–2004 Chief of the Near East/South Asia Division
Jose Rodriguez	Panama, Mexico, and the Dominican Republic		
John R. Sano	Seoul		Chief of East Asia Division, 2004–2005
Winston M. Scott	London	1947–1950	Mexico City, 1956–1969
Charles Seidel	Cairo	c. 2000–2002	Baghdad 2002–2003; Amman 2003–2005
Theodore Shackley	Laos	1966–1968	Saigon 1968–1972
John Sipher	Jakarta	c. 2010	
Stephen Slick	Budapest	c. 1998–2000	
Michael Sulick	Moscow	1994–1996	Chief of Central Eurasian Division 1999–2002; Deputy Director of CIA for Operations 2007–2010
John Stockwell	Katanga	1968	Burundi 1970
Carleton Swift	Baghdad	1956–1957	
Hugh Tovar	Malaysia and Indonesia	1960s	Laos and Thailand, 1970s; Vientiane, Laos, beginning in May 1973
Greg Vogle	Kabul	2004–2006, 2009–2010	
Terry Ward	Honduras	c. 1987–1989	
Andrew Warren	Algeria	2007–2008	convicted of rape while in station
Richard Welch	Lima	1972	Athens 1975; assassinated by Revolutionary Organization 17 November (17N)
Terrence L. Williams	Taipei	c. 2003	under the title of Research and Planning Section Chief, American Institute in Taiwan (AIT)
Joseph Wippl	Berlin	c. 2001–2003	
Frank Wisner	London	c. 1959	formerly DDP 1952–1959
Alan D. Wolfe	Lahore	c. 1969	Kabul; Islamabad formerly chief of Near East and South Asia Division; Rome c. 1980s

== Bibliography ==
- Edward J. Epstein, Deception. the invisible war between the KGB and the CIA (New York: Simon and Schuster 1989).
- David Hoffman, Billion Dollar Spy. A true story of Cold War espionage and betrayal (New York: Doubleday 2015).
- Ralph McGehee, Deadly Deceits. My 25 years in the CIA (New York: Sheridan Square 1983).
- John Prados, William Colby and the CIA. The secret wars of a controversial spymaster (University of Kansas 2003, 2009).
- W. Thomas Smith, Jr., Encyclopedia of the Central Intelligence Agency (New York: Facts on File 2003).
- Evan Thomas, The Very Best Men. The daring early years of the CIA (New York: Simon and Schuster 1995, 2006).
