= Georgetown Set =

American political club

The term Georgetown Set refers to an informal circle of influential US policymakers, intelligence officials, journalists, and academics in Washington, D.C. This group of “Cold Warriors” was based in Georgetown (an affluent neighborhood in Washington) and met regularly for social evenings that often led to political discussions. Formed in the late 1940s, the Georgetown Set dominated US foreign policy discourse during the Cold War until around the mid-1970s. Henry Kissinger described the group's influence in the following words: “The hand that mixes the Georgetown martini is often the hand that directs the fate of the Western world.”

== History ==
Gregg Herken dated the origins of the Georgetown Set to 1926, when the future US Secretary of State Dean Acheson purchased a house in Georgetown. Even in the 1930s, the American capital was still considered a “political village“ lacking its own intelligentsia. This finally changed when more and more foreign policy decision-makers moved to Georgetown and networked with each other.

After the Second World War, a core group of liberal anti-communists formed in Washington, D.C., mostly members of the East Coast establishment or academics who were involved in the Democratic Party. They responded to the threat posed by the Soviet Union (for example, after the atomic bomb test in 1949 and the Sputnik shock in 1957) with a tough foreign policy stance. As critics noted, the “Georgetowners” were typical liberal Democrats who pursued progressive goals at home, opposed domestic extremists, and at the same time supported an uncompromising course toward the USSR. However, they rejected the anti-communism of the McCarthy era, which they found vulgar.

Former officers of the Office of Strategic Services (OSS) played a key role in establishing the network and went on to play a central role in the founding of the Central Intelligence Agency (CIA) in 1947 after the end of the war. In 1948, foreign policy strategist George Kennan recruited former OSS agent Frank Wisner as the first head of the CIA's covert operations department (Office of Policy Coordination, OPC). Wisner immediately began conducting covert information operations (espionage, propaganda) during the Cold War. Other founding figures included CIA strategist Allen Dulles (later CIA director) and other former OSS employees. Many viewed the coming together of these circles as part of a “salon politics” approach.

From 1945 onwards, the group met regularly for Sunday dinners and receptions in Georgetown. For almost three decades, from 1945 to around 1974, influential hosts and guests gathered in the evenings to debate “issues of the day.” Foreign policy guidelines were discussed in these salons, often over cocktails and dinner. This custom was described with the catchphrase “salonism” because politics were conducted informally here. As Phil Graham, editor of the Washington Post, put it, the dinners were “a form of government by invitation.”

The Georgetown Set reached its peak in the 1950s and 1960s. The central element was the famous Sunday “Zoo Parties” at the home of columnist Joseph Alsop (2720 Dumbarton Avenue). Guests regularly included senators, ambassadors, judges, CIA officials, and prominent journalists from both parties. At these gatherings, guests played chess or listened to orchestral records, but also spent alcohol-fueled nights debating the central challenges of the Cold War, from the containment strategy toward the Soviet Union to McCarthyism and the arms race to headlines such as the missile gap with the USSR and, finally, the Vietnam War.

Members of the Georgetown Set such as Dulles and Wisner played a decisive role as a lobby group in the founding of the CIA and subsequently exerted a decisive influence on its leadership, with members of the Georgetown Set often being recruited into the CIA. The meetings in Georgetown frequently discussed the most sensitive CIA operations of the Cold War, including regime change abroad. The group also played a key role in the CIA's Operation Mockingbird to influence the media. With the help of Philip Graham (the head of the operation), the CIA was able to infiltrate important press houses and influence reporting in its favor.

The group had a few secrets. From 1957 onwards, Alsop was blackmailed by the KGB because of his homosexuality, and later FBI director J. Edgar Hoover also tried unsuccessfully to blackmail Alsop with this information. Although he was in contact with the KGB, Alsop remained an anti-communist. The close ties cultivated in Georgetown were reflected in the fact that US President John F. Kennedy was associated with the circle: he was a frequent guest at Joe Alsop's home (for example, on the evening of his inauguration in 1961) and was friends with Phil Graham. The network thus accompanied the course of events such as the Cuban Missile Crisis, during which Kennedy briefed Soviet Ambassador Charles “Chip” Bohlen, while the journalists present reported mostly favorably.

At the end of the 1960s and beginning of the 1970s, the group partially disintegrated due to internal divisions. The Vietnam War divided the community: some, such as Alsop, remained staunch supporters of the war, which discredited them in the public eye. In fact, in 1974, in the wake of the Vietnam decline, Alsop's column in the Herald Tribune also came to an end, symbolically marking the end of the Georgetown Set era. There were also personal tragedies: Philip Graham committed suicide in 1963 and Frank Wisner in 1965, while Mary Pinchot Meyer (ex-wife of CIA agent Cord Meyer) was murdered in 1964, with her death being linked to conspiracy theories surrounding the Kennedy assassination. Other members, such as Stewart Alsop, suffered from severe mental health problems and died in the 1970s.

By the mid-1970s, the informal network had effectively dissolved; commentators noted that debates in Washington had since taken place less in private salons and more in partisan think tanks.

== Influence ==
The Georgetown Set shaped both the structure and orientation of US foreign policy during the Cold War. Many of its members were co-founders or early employees of the CIA and promoted a confrontational, anti-communist line. The Georgetown Group mainly supported Democratic Party candidates such as Harry Truman (1948) and Adlai Stevenson (1952 and 1956). It was also credited with influencing the appointments to the Kennedy administration, including Lyndon B. Johnson becoming Kennedy's vice president. The “main enemy” of the liberal Georgetown Set was the group around Senator Joseph McCarthy and FBI Director J. Edgar Hoover, who viewed the CIA, which was influenced by the Georgetown Set, as a “sinkhole of communists” and described the OPC as “Wisner's gang of weirdos.” He ultimately attempted to obtain compromising information about the members of the group, but ultimately fell victim to a negative press campaign launched by the Georgetown Set.

The Georgetown group also had considerable influence on the media itself. At the top was the Washington Post under Philip and Katharine Graham. After Philip Graham's death in 1963, Katharine took over the paper and remained closely associated with the network. Media critics point out that the Post and the Alsops supported government policy well into the 1960s, for example the escalation in Vietnam, and thus lost their independence. Gregg Herken, for example, emphasizes that this close relation led some leading media outlets to fail to critically accompany several war mistakes in Vietnam. In addition to newspapers, the Georgetown set cultivated relationships with think tanks and universities, especially in the Washington area and on the East Coast. Many members were also active in advisory bodies (e.g., Council on Foreign Relations) or were closely associated with teaching positions. Overall, they contributed to the close links between academic institutions and the media in the US and politics.

== Members ==
The Georgetown set included numerous prominent figures from US politics, intelligence agencies, and the press. Important members included:

- Dean Acheson, Politician and U.S. Secretary of State
- Joseph Alsop, Journalist
- Stewart Alsop, Journalist
- James Jesus Angleton, Intelligence officer, long-time head of the CIA's counterintelligence department
- Tracy Barnes, Intelligence officer and manager of CIA operations in the 1954 Guatemalan coup d'état and the 1961 Bay of Pigs Invasion
- Richard M. Bissell Jr., Intelligence officer
- Tom Braden, Journalist and intelligence agent, CNN presenter
- Ben Bradlee, Journalist and editor-in-chief of the Washington Post
- David K. E. Bruce, Diplomat, intelligence officer and politician, Ambassador to NATO and multiple countries
- Charles „Chip“ Bohlen, Career diplomat and multiple-term U.S. Ambassador to the Soviet Union and France
- Clark Clifford, American public official
- John Sherman Cooper, Politician of the Republican Party, US ambassador to East Germany, and member of the Warren Commission
- Allen Welsh Dulles, Secret service officer of the OSS and later the CIA, director of the CIA (1953–1961), member of the Warren Commission
- Desmond FitzGerald, Intelligence officer
- Felix Frankfurter, Judge at the Supreme Court of the United States
- Philip L. Graham (1915–1963), Publisher of the Washington Post (1946–1963)
- Katharine (Kay) Graham, Publisher of the Washington Post (1963–1979), took over the management of the publishing house after her husband's death
- Averell Harriman, Democrat politician, was ambassador to the Soviet Union, Secretary of Commerce, and Governor of the State of New York
- Richard Helms, Intelligence official and director of the CIA (1966–1973)
- George F. Kennan, Diplomat and architect of the containment doctrine
- John F. Kennedy, Politician and President of the United States (1961–1963)
- Jacqueline Kennedy Onassis, Journalist and First Lady of the United States (1961–1963)
- Henry A. Kissinger, National Security Advisor and later Secretary of State; although he joined late, he was considered part of the set (especially in the 1960s)
- Paul H. Nitze (1907–2004), Under Secretary of Defense and later advisor; an important strategic thinker during the Cold War
- Cord Meyer (1920–2001), Naval officer and CIA agent, head of the World Federalists
- Mary Pinchot Meyer, Painter and John F. Kennedy's mistress for several years
- John Jay McCloy, Lawyer, banker and politician, President of the World Bank, High Commissioner in Germany, Chairman of Chase Manhattan Bank, and member of the Warren Commission
- James Reston, journalist and editor at The New York Times
- Walt Whitman Rostow, Economist, economic historian, and National Security Advisor under Lyndon B. Johnson
- Arthur M. Schlesinger Jr., Historian and advisor to several presidents (including Kennedy)
- Frank G. Wisner, US intelligence officer and first director of the CIA's OPC intelligence division

== Literature ==
- The Georgetown Set: Friends and Rivals in Cold War Washington. Knopf Doubleday Publishing Group. 2015-11-24. ISBN 978-0-307-45634-2.
