= Seymour Russell =

Seymour C. Russell (May 4, 1919 - March 9, 2000) was a CIA officer who served as station chief in Rome and Karachi, as deputy chief in Athens, Greece and Trieste, Italy and as Director of the CIA's Technical Services Division. He retired from the CIA in 1973.

Born in New York City and raised in Hartford, Russell graduated from New York University, the University of California Berkeley, and the University of Connecticut Law School. After serving four years as a military intelligence officer in Italy, Russell joined the newly founded Central Intelligence Agency in 1947, serving in foreign and domestic posts for 26 years and rising to the highest professional rank in the CIA. As a member of the Clandestine Services, he served as Station Chief in Rome, Italy from 1966 to 1971 and in Karachi, Pakistan. He was also Deputy Chief in Athens, Greece, and Trieste, Italy, and Director of the CIA's Technical Services Division. Russell and his family lived in Northern Virginia during his assignments in Washington.

Russell retired from the CIA in 1973, living for 20 years in St. Petersburg, FL. He and his wife moved to Northern California in 1994. He died on March 9, 2000, at Stanford Medical Center in Palo Alto, CA.

== Bibliography ==
- Russell, Seymour. The Courant, March 13, 2000.
