= Tracy Barnes =

American CIA staff member (1911–1972)

- Born: Charles Tracy Barnes; August 2, 1911; Manhasset, Long Island, New York
- Died: February 18, 1972 (aged 60); Saunderstown, Rhode Island
- Education: Harvard Law School
- Police career
- Department: Central Intelligence Agency
- Branch: Paramilitary Psychological Operations (1953-1954); Chief Of Station (Germany, 1954-1956); Chief Of Station (United Kingdom, 1957-1959); Assistant Deputy Director for Plans (1960-1962); Domestic Operations Division (1962-1966)
- Service years: 1951-1966
- Other work: Lawyer
- Military career
- Allegiance: United States
- Branch: (United States Army) U.S. Army Air Forces
- 1942-1950: Enlistment
- Rank: 2nd Lieutenant
- Units: Office of Strategic Services (World War II); Psychological Strategy Board (Korean War)
- Wars: World War II; Korean War
- Awards: Croix de Guerre (France); Silver Star (United States)

Charles Tracy Barnes (August 2, 1911 – February 18, 1972) was a senior staff member at the United States' Central Intelligence Agency (CIA), serving as principal manager of CIA operations in the 1954 Guatemalan coup d'état and the 1961 Bay of Pigs Invasion.

== History ==
Tracy was born in Manhasset, Long Island, New York to Courtlandt Dixon Barnes and Katherine Lansing Barney. He was educated at Groton School and Yale University, where he became a member of the Scroll and Key secret society. He graduated from Harvard Law School in 1937 and was hired by William Harding Jackson as an associate (1937-1939) at the Wall Street firm of Carter, Ledyard & Milburn.

As World War II began, Barnes was commissioned as a 2nd Lieutenant and was one of the first persons to attend the US Army-Air Forces Air Combat Intelligence School at Harrisburg, PA in June 1942 along with his '2nd cousin' John Hay 'Jock' Whitney. Barnes was married to Janet who was born June 10, 1913, in Providence, Rhode Island. At the Intelligence School, they began a lifelong friendship with the Whitneys. When Jock Whitney served as US Ambassador to Great Britain, Barnes served as CIA station chief in London.

During World War II he served first with United States Army Air Forces intelligence with the Office of Strategic Services. He was awarded France's Croix de Guerre and the US Silver Star. After the war, he returned to legal practice.

== CIA career ==
In 1950 he went to Washington to serve as special assistant to Under Secretary of the Army, Archibald S. Alexander. He also served as deputy director of the Psychological Strategy Board during the Korean War.

In 1951 he joined the CIA. In 1953, he was appointed Special Assistant for Paramilitary Psychological Operations, under Frank Wisner, and was the principal case officer in the CIA operation leading up to the 1954 Guatemalan coup d'état.

From 1954 to 1956, he was appointed Chief Of Station (COS) in Germany and in the United Kingdom from 1957 to 1959.

In 1960, he was appointed Assistant Deputy Director for Plans, under Richard M. Bissell Jr., with direct responsibility for the CIA operation leading to the Bay of Pigs Invasion in April 1961.

In 1962, he was made head of the CIA's Domestic Operations Division.

In July 1966 new CIA Director Richard Helms had Desmond FitzGerald fire Barnes from the CIA.

== Later life ==
In June 1970, Tracy Barnes suffered a serious stroke. His recovery was slow and on 18 February 1972, he had a heart attack and died at his home at Saunderstown, Rhode Island, at age 60.

== Additional References ==
- Bissell, Richard M. (Jr.), with Jonathan E. Lewis and Frances T. Pudlo (1996). Reflections of a Cold Warrior: From Yalta to the Bay of Pigs. Yale University Press. ISBN 978-0300064308.
- Higgins, Trumbull (1987). The Perfect Failure: Kennedy, Eisenhower, and the CIA at the Bay of Pigs. Norton. ISBN 978-0393305630.
- Hunt, E. Howard (1973). Give Us This Day. Arlington House. ISBN 978-0870002281.
