= Richard M. Bissell Jr. =

Central Intelligence Agency officer (1909–1994)

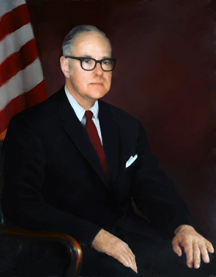

First Co-Director of the National Reconnaissance Office
- In office September 1961 – February 1962
- President: John F. Kennedy
- Succeeded by: Joseph V. Charyk

Personal details
- Born: Richard Mervin Bissell Jr. September 18, 1909 Hartford, Connecticut, United States
- Died: February 7, 1994 (aged 84) Farmington, Connecticut, United States
- Spouse: Ann Cornelia Bushnell (m. 1940)
- Children: 5
- Education: Yale University; London School of Economics
- Profession: Central Intelligence Agency officer

Richard Mervin Bissell Jr. (September 18, 1909 – February 7, 1994) was an American Central Intelligence Agency officer responsible for major projects such as the U-2 spy plane and the Bay of Pigs Invasion. The journalist Annie Jacobsen said he was referred to by many as "the mayor of Area 51" due to his close involvement in turning that Nevada salt flat into a top-secret U-2 testing facility.

== Early years ==
Bissell Jr. came from a well-to-do family; his father, Richard Bissell, was president of Hartford Fire Insurance. Bissell Jr. was born in the Mark Twain House in Hartford, Connecticut, and went to Groton School in Groton, Massachusetts. Two of his fellow pupils were Joseph Alsop and Tracy Barnes. He studied history at Yale University and graduated in 1932. He attended the London School of Economics until 1933 before returning to Yale for postgraduate studies in economics. He worked as a consultant to Fortune magazine for two years starting in 1937. He obtained his Ph.D. in economics from Yale in 1939. He remained there as an assistant professor until 1941. The following year, he joined the U.S. Department of Commerce as Chief Economic Analyst of the Bureau of Foreign and Domestic Commerce.

== Marshall Plan ==
In July 1947, Bissell was recruited by W. Averell Harriman to run a committee to lobby for an economic recovery plan for Europe. In 1948, he was appointed assistant deputy administrator of the Economic Cooperation Administration (ECA) (better known as the Marshall Plan) in Germany and eventually became the ECA's deputy director and acting director. He worked with the Office of Policy Coordination (OPC) in diverting counterpart funds of the ECA to OPC operations in Europe.

== Georgetown Set ==
Bissell and his wife Ann moved to Washington, D.C., where they associated with a group of journalists, politicians, and government officials who were later termed "the Georgetown Set". Originally formed in 1945–1948 by a cadre of Office of Strategic Services (OSS) veterans of WWII—Frank Wisner, Stewart Alsop, Thomas Braden, Philip Graham, David K. E. Bruce and Walt Rostow—the politically influential Georgetown Set drew its membership from the Georgetown neighborhood within the upper northwest section of the capital. The group would grow to include George Kennan, Dean Acheson, William Averell Harriman, Desmond FitzGerald, Joseph Alsop, Tracy Barnes, Ben Bradlee, John F. Kennedy, Clark Clifford, Charles "Chip" Bohlen, James Angleton, Felix Frankfurter, James "Scotty" Reston, Allen Dulles and Paul Nitze.

== CIA career ==
While Bissell was working for the Ford Foundation, Frank Wisner persuaded him to join the Central Intelligence Agency (CIA). This would begin the most eventful years of Bissell's life.

=== U-2 'spy plane' ===
In 1954, he was placed in charge of developing and operating the Lockheed U-2 "spy plane". He and Herbert Miller, another CIA officer, chose Area 51 as the site for the U-2 test facility, and Bissell supervised the facility and its build-up until he resigned from the CIA nearly a decade later. The U-2 spy plane was a great success and within two years Bissell was able to say that 90% of all hard intelligence about the Soviet Union coming into the CIA was "funneled through the lens of the U-2's aerial cameras".

The U-2 photographs debunked the allegations of a "bomber gap"—the belief that the Soviets had amassed a numerical advantage over the U.S. in strategic bomber aircraft which could reach the other country—and convinced President Dwight D. Eisenhower that Nikita Khrushchev was lying about the number of bombers and missiles being built by the Soviet Union. However, because of the shroud of secrecy erected by the CIA around the U-2 spy plane as its source of information, the "bomber gap" hysteria in some American circles was not easily put to rest.

In 1956, after the Soviets protested the first U-2 overflights, Bissell initiated Project RAINBOW to develop radar camouflage for the aircraft. When this was unsuccessful, he launched Project Gusto to design a follow-on aircraft. Gusto evolved into Project Oxcart, under which the CIA developed and operated the Lockheed A-12.

=== Vision for the CIA ===
In 1957, Bissell delivered an address at the CIA entitled "The Stimulation of Innovation". He called for funding the research and development of groundbreaking new technologies for intelligence gathering and surveillance. He acknowledged that such surveillance may entail "gray activities" by the CIA, such as surveillance that the agency might not have the legal right to undertake. But he said the dubious legal status of such activities should not preclude the CIA from pursuing them. He also advocated that the CIA implement covert political actions in target countries.

=== CIA Deputy Director for Plans ===
After Frank Wisner suffered a mental breakdown in September 1958, Bissell replaced him as the CIA's Deputy Director for Plans. Bissell assumed the office on 1 January 1959. He was meanwhile also playing a key role as CIA Program Manager in the development of the Corona program.

Leading the CIA's Directorate of Plans (DDP) put Bissell in a vital position. The DDP branch of the CIA was responsible for covert operations, such as the prior overthrow of Mohammad Mosaddegh and Jacobo Árbenz. When Bissell took office, the main DDP target was Fidel Castro.

In March 1960, a top-secret policy paper, titled "A Program of Covert Action Against the Castro Regime" (code-named JMARC), was drafted "to bring about the replacement of the Castro regime with one more ... acceptable to the U.S. in such a manner as to avoid any appearance of U.S. intervention." The courses of action outlined in the paper were based on Operation PBSuccess, which had worked to great effect in Guatemala in 1954. In fact, Bissell assembled the same team as the one used in Guatemala: Tracy Barnes, David Atlee Phillips, Jacob Esterline, William "Rip" Robertson, E. Howard Hunt and Gerry Droller (aka "Frank Bender"). Added to the team were Lieutenant Colonel Jack Hawkins, Desmond FitzGerald, William Harvey and Ted Shackley.

The covert action plan to overthrow Castro was presented to President Dwight Eisenhower at an Oval Office meeting on 17 March 1960, and he quickly authorized it. The onus of carrying out the plan gradually fell to Bissell.

It was later disputed as to who first set in motion the plot to kill Castro. Most CIA histories state that Bissell approached Sheffield Edwards, director of the CIA's Office of Security, in August 1960. In Bissell's memoir and his 1975 testimony to a presidential commission, he said he was approached by Edwards. In any case, Bissell acknowledged, "when the plan was presented to me I supported it.

In September 1960, Bissell initiated talks with two leading figures of the Mafia, Johnny Roselli and Sam Giancana. Soon, other crime bosses such as Carlos Marcello, Santo Trafficante Jr. and Meyer Lansky became involved in the assassination plots against Castro. Robert Maheu, a veteran of CIA counter-espionage activities, was instructed to offer the Mafia $150,000 to kill the Cuban prime minister. The advantage of employing the Mafia for this work is that it provided the CIA with a credible cover story. The Mafia were known to be furious with Castro for closing down their profitable Havana casinos. If the assassination was traced back to organized crime, "it would hardly raise an eyebrow."

=== Bay of Pigs Invasion plans ===
On 18 November 1960 in Palm Beach, Florida, President-elect John F. Kennedy was briefed by Bissell and CIA Director Allen Dulles on the JMARC proposal. It entailed a landing in the Cuban coastal town of Trinidad, not far from the Escambray Mountains, allegedly a hotbed of anti-Castro resistance. According to Bissell, Kennedy remained impassive throughout the briefing. He expressed surprise only at the size of the operation he had inherited from Eisenhower.

In late January 1961, President Kennedy asked the Joint Chiefs of Staff (JCS) to vet the JMARC proposal. To preserve "plausible deniability", the proposal only included the invasion, not the plot to kill Castro. After deliberating, the JCS concluded that if the invaders were given four days of air cover, and if the Cubans living in the Trinidad area joined the rebellion, and if they could establish a guerrilla presence in the Escambray Mountains, then the operation had a "fair chance" of succeeding. The JCS analysis put the probability of success at 30 percent.

At a meeting on 11 March 1961, Kennedy rejected the JMARC proposal: "'Too spectacular,' he told Bissell. 'It sounds like D-Day. You have to reduce the noise level of this thing.'" He asked Bissell to scale back the plan, and to choose a more remote landing site than Trinidad. Bissell and his team worked around the clock for three days and returned with a revised plan, code-named Operation Zapata. As requested, the landing was no longer at Trinidad. Instead, Bissell selected Bahia de Cochinos (Bay of Pigs), 80 miles from the Escambray Mountains. The journey to the mountains would now necessitate crossing an impenetrable swamp. As CIA officer David Atlee Phillips and others noted, the revised plan rendered nearly impossible the "fallback option" of the invaders retreating into the mountains if the initial landing went badly.

The scaled-back plan had less chance for success, but as Allen Dulles recorded at the time: "We felt that when the chips were down, when the crisis arose in reality, any action required for success would be authorized rather than permit the enterprise to fail." In other words, he and Bissell realized that the invasion, as designed, was likely to fail, but they expected Kennedy to agree to additional military support needed to prevent a negative outcome. According to Evan Thomas (The Very Best Men): "Some old CIA hands believe that Bissell was setting a trap to force U.S. intervention." Edgar Applewhite, a former deputy inspector general, said Bissell and Dulles were "building a tar baby."

=== Invasion fails ===
The operation relied on the effectiveness of Radio Swan broadcasts from the Swan Islands, located 95 miles northeast of Honduras. The radio operation, run by David Atlee Phillips with assistance from E. Howard Hunt, encouraged the Cuban Army to desert the Cuban government and join the invaders (a propaganda ploy that had worked well on the Guatemalan Army in the 1954 coup). However, the Cuban soldiers were not persuaded.

It was soon apparent to Bissell that the invasion at the Bay of Pigs by Brigade 2506 was facing disaster. At 7 a.m. on April 18, he told President Kennedy that the brigade of Cuban exiles was trapped on the beaches and encircled by Castro's military. Bissell asked Kennedy to send in American forces to save the men. Bissell anticipated he would say "Yes". Instead, the President replied that he still wanted "minimum visibility" of the U.S. role in the invasion.

That night, Bissell had another meeting with the President. This time it took place in the White House and included General Lyman Lemnitzer, Chairman of the Joint Chiefs of Staff, and Admiral Arleigh Burke, Chief of Naval Operations. General Lemnitzer called for the brigade to march into the Escambray Mountains, but Bissell explained this was not an option as their route was being blocked by 20,000 Cuban troops. Bissell informed Kennedy that the operation could still be saved if U.S. warplanes were allowed to fly cover. Admiral Burke urged the President, "Let me take two jets and shoot down the enemy aircraft." But Kennedy declined, "reminding Bissell and Burke that he has warned them over and over again that he would not commit U.S. forces to combat."

As Evan Thomas points out in The Very Best Men, "Bissell had been caught in his own web. 'Plausible deniability' was intended to protect the president, but as he had used it, it was a tool to gain and maintain control over an operation.... Without plausible deniability, the Cuba project would have been turned over to the Pentagon, and Bissell would have become a supporting actor."

== Post-CIA ==
Since Bissell was the primary architect of the failed Bay of Pigs invasion, he bore the brunt of the blame. As a face-saving exit from the CIA, Kennedy offered him a post as director of a new science and technology department. It would leave Bissell in charge of developing the Lockheed A-12, the new spy plane that would make the U-2 obsolete. Bissell turned down the offer. In February 1962, he left the CIA and was replaced as Deputy Director for Plans by Richard Helms.

In July 1962, Bissell joined the Institute for Defense Analyses (IDA) and eventually served as its president. IDA was a Pentagon think tank set up to evaluate weapons systems. From 1964–74, he worked for the Hartford-based United Technologies, a large military contractor. He also worked as a consultant for the Ford Foundation.

In February 1994, Bissell died at his home in Farmington, Connecticut. He was 84. His autobiography, Reflections of a Cold Warrior: From Yalta to the Bay of Pigs, was published posthumously in 1996.

== See also ==
- Central Intelligence Agency – U.S. intelligence and covert action agency
- Bay of Pigs Invasion – 1961 failed landing operation of Cuba
