= Steven L. Hall =

American intelligence officer

- Other name: Steve Hall
- Citizenship: United States
- Occupations: Intelligence officer, national security analyst
- Employer(s): Central Intelligence Agency (until 2015); CNN
- Known for: Managing the CIA's Russian operations
- Title: Chief of the Central Eurasia Division, CIA

Steven L. Hall is a retired American Central Intelligence Agency officer who served for 30 years before retiring in 2015. He headed CIA operations in Russia and retired as chief of the agency's Central Eurasia Division, which managed its Russian operations worldwide.

After retiring from the CIA, Hall became a CNN national security analyst and commentator on Russian affairs. In October 2020, he was among 51 former intelligence officials who signed a letter stating that reporting on Hunter Biden's laptop had "all the classic earmarks of a Russian information operation". In January 2025, President Donald Trump revoked the security clearances of all 51 signatories.

== Career ==
Hall began as a case officer and spent 30 years in the Clandestine Service, primarily managing intelligence operations in Eurasia and Latin America. He spent most of his career abroad and was a member of the Senior Intelligence Service, the cadre of senior-most leaders in the CIA's Clandestine Service.

He was the CIA station chief in Russia, and also the head of the agency's Russian operations in Moscow. Before his retirement, Hall served as Chief of the Central Eurasia Division, where he was responsible for managing the CIA's Russian operations worldwide. He retired in 2015.

The public exposure of a CIA station chief was described by intelligence experts as a serious breach of diplomatic protocol. Hall retired from the CIA in 2015.

== Post-CIA career ==
After retiring, Hall became a national security analyst for CNN, providing commentary on Russian affairs and intelligence matters. In March 2019 he gave testimony on Russia under Vladimir Putin to the House Permanent Select Committee on Intelligence. He has been interviewed on NPR about Russian affairs, including the 2018 Helsinki summit and the 2020 poisoning of Alexei Navalny. He said there was no doubt that the nerve agent could not have reached Navalny unless someone very senior in the Russian government and intelligence services had wanted it.

== Hunter Biden laptop letter ==
In October 2020, Hall was among 51 former intelligence officials who signed a public letter stating that the New York Post reporting on Hunter Biden's laptop had "all the classic earmarks of a Russian information operation". The letter stated the signatories did not know whether the emails were genuine and did not have evidence of Russian involvement.

== Security clearance revocation ==
On January 20, 2025, President Donald Trump signed an executive order revoking the security clearances of all 51 signatories of the laptop letter. The order accused the signatories of having "willfully weaponized the gravitas of the Intelligence Community to manipulate the political process and undermine our democratic institutions". Hall is among the former officials named in the order. Legal experts described the mass revocation as unprecedented.

== See also ==
- Hunter Biden laptop letter
- List of CIA station chiefs
