= David Blee =

CIA agent (1916–2000)

David Henry Blee (November 20, 1916 - August 4, 2000) served in the Central Intelligence Agency (CIA) from its founding in 1947 until his 1985 retirement. During World War II in the Office of Strategic Services (OSS), he had worked in Southeast Asia. In the CIA, he served as Chief of Station (COS) in Asia and Africa, starting in the 1950s. He then led the CIA's Near East Division.

He is best known for his work as head of the CIA's Soviet Division, where he made significant changes in espionage strategy. Specifically, Soviets who came forward to offer intelligence information to the CIA would no longer be greeted with harsh treatment and categorically subjected to an enduring suspicion. His transformative changes led to the departure of James Angleton, the counterintelligence chief who had long enjoyed a dominant role in the CIA.

== Education and early career ==
David Henry Blee was born in San Francisco in 1916. He graduated from Stanford University in political science summa cum laude in 1938, and from Harvard Law in 1942. He had played in the Stanford band. In 1943 he joined the Army, first serving in the Army Corps of Engineers. He soon transferred to the OSS. With a small group of intelligence agents he boarded a submarine to be put ashore on an island off Thailand. Their mission was to spot and report the appearances of shipping, the Japanese fleet, and naval operations.

"Intrigued by that experience with clandestine operations" the lawyer decided to make a career in the intelligence field. In 1947 he joined the newly formed CIA, a civilian spy service, following the post-war disbanding of the OSS.

== As Chief of Station ==
At CIA he rose in its ranks to the coveted position of Chief of Station (COS). Starting in the 1950s, he ran the CIA office in Pretoria, South Africa. Later he headed CIA operations in Islamabad, Pakistan.

During the mid-1960s, he served again as COS, this time in New Delhi, India. Blee was at the American Embassy when Svetlana Stalina walked in and requested asylum. "Blee demonstrated insight and fast action" in that "while Washington dithered about how to respond" to the defection of the late Soviet dictator's daughter, "he put her on an airplane and spirited her out of the country to safety."

== At CIA Headquarters ==
=== Near East Division ===
He returned then to CIA Headquarters near Washington, D.C. Following the Six-Day War in 1967, DCI Richard Helms had appointed him to lead the CIA's Near East Division, which supervised its espionage operations in the region. "One of his major responsibilities was tracking the emergence of Palestinian guerrilla groups, in the hope of anticipating their increasingly violent actions against western targets."

=== Soviet Division ===
File 104-10012-10022 written by Blee related to Valeriy Vladimirovich Kostikov's connection to the KGB, the assassination of John F. Kennedy and Lee Harvey Oswald

In 1971 DCI Helms appointed Blee head of the Soviet Division. From that position Blee later, under DCI William Colby, initiated significant policy changes in CIA operations. In particular, Soviet citizens who volunteered information were no longer assumed to be "dangles" or plants, a species of double agent. Such provocateur agents were sent by the KGB to infiltrate ('penetrate' in spy talk) its rival the CIA. Instead, under Blee, each "defector" volunteering information was to be questioned, analyzed and appraised on bona fides particular to each case. These substantial changes in CIA method eventually led to the early departure of James J. Angleton from his post as chief of counterintelligence. Angleton's influence had worked to compel a harsh, aggressive scrutiny of every putative defector from the Soviet Union.

Angleton had previously enjoyed a dominant role in the CIA. By the mid-1960s, however, his convoluted analysis of Soviet deception caused him to become extreme. He mandated a rigorous suspicion of any Soviet volunteer as a probable fake defector under KGB control. To avert the danger of the communist penetrating CIA, he would in effect discontinue espionage against the Soviets. Eventually Angleton's strident mistrust "stripped the agency of almost all its Soviet informants, who were repeatedly denounced as double agents."

Furthermore, Angleton "became convinced that that a Soviet mole--a deeply hidden spy--had penetrated the CIA." Angleton was never able to find the suspected mole among CIA personnel, "but several careers were ruined." In the meantime, Angleton had "tied the CIA in knots by placing virtually anyone under suspicion."

According to former CIA officer Haviland Smith, "[Blee] was the architect of the program that turned the clandestine service back on target against the Soviets after all the years of Angleton." Smith and other CIA agents, particularly Burton Gerber and David Forden, had worked to innovate a new generation of spy tradecraft. It made success more likely for American espionage activity in the "hostile, surveillance-heavy environment" behind the Iron Curtain. The new Gerber rules for espionage in the Soviet bloc also meant "check out a volunteer, don't dismiss him out of hand."

Without ever igniting an open confrontation with Angleton, Blee identified a select cadre of American agents untainted by Angleton's mole hunt and set them about cultivating Soviet defectors who could spy for the United States.

=== Counterintelligence ===
He ended his career in the job long held by Angleton: from 1978 until 1985 he served as CIA's Counterintelligence chief. Blee remained innovative. He was "one of the first to open channels of communication with the KGB in the waning years of the Soviet Union." According to Clair George, a former D/NCS for the CIA, Blee "had a greater intellectual command of overseas operational activity than any officer I ever knew."

== Honors, retirement ==
Blee was awarded two CIA Distinguished Intelligence Medals, the National Intelligence Distinguished Service Medal, and the National Security Medal.

"On September 18, 1997, the CIA celebrated its 50th anniversary with a discreet ceremony at its headquarters at Langley, Virginia. Director George Tenet awarded special medallions to 50 past and present staff for their outstanding contributions to postwar American intelligence. High up the list was David Blee." The citation "praised him simply for 'creating a professional counterintelligence discipline'."

Already retired in 1985, he led a quiet life teaching Sunday school and enjoying opera. Blee died at his home in Bethesda, Maryland. He was survived by his wife of 53 years, Margaret Gauer Blee; four sons, John David, Robert Henry, David Cooper, and Richard Earl; a daughter, Elizabeth Blee Fritsch; and four grandchildren. His son Richard later served in the CIA.
