= Tom Braden =

American CIA official and journalist (1917–2009)

- Born: Thomas Wardell Braden; February 22, 1917; Greene, Iowa, U.S.
- Died: April 3, 2009 (aged 92); Denver, Colorado, U.S.
- Education: Dartmouth College
- Occupations: Columnist, pundit
- Political party: Democratic
- Spouse: Joan Ridley Braden (m. 1948; died 1999)
- Children: 8

Thomas Wardell Braden (February 22, 1917 – April 3, 2009) was an American Central Intelligence Agency (CIA) official, journalist – best remembered as the author of Eight Is Enough, which spawned a television program – and co-host of the CNN show Crossfire.

== Intelligence service in OSS and CIA ==
After graduating from Dartmouth College in 1940, Braden enlisted in the British Army while the U.S. was still neutral in World War II, serving in the North African campaign in the King's Royal Rifle Corps. When the United States entered the war, he was recruited by the U.S. Office of Strategic Services (OSS), the predecessor of the Central Intelligence Agency (CIA), and he was parachuted behind enemy lines into Nazi-occupied France. At the end of the war, with the encouragement of OSS Director William "Wild Bill" Donovan, who thought of Braden as a protégé, he and his OSS paratrooper compatriot Stewart Alsop wrote a journalistic book about the OSS, two years before it was replaced by Harry Truman with the CIA.

After the war, Braden taught English for a time at Dartmouth, where he met Robert Frost, and he later moved to Washington, D.C., and became part of a group of well-connected former OSS men, some of whom were journalists such as the Alsop brothers, known as the Georgetown Set. Braden began staunchly advocating for a permanent civilian American intelligence agency.

In 1950, at the start of the Korean War, Allen Dulles invited Braden to become his personal assistant at the Central Intelligence Agency. He accepted, and was assigned the codename "Homer D. Hoskins". His role was without portfolio, apparently assigned to Frank Wisner’s Office of Policy Coordination (OPC) but in reality working directly subordinate to Dulles. It was upon Braden’s suggestion that Wisner’s OPC and the then small and under-utilized International Organizations Branch be merged, allowing him to set up the new International Organizations Division (IOD) under the deputy director of plans (DDP).

Believing that the cultural milieu of postwar Europe was favorable toward left-wing views, he understood that the Western Allies' Establishment was rigidly conservative and nationalistic and determined to maintain their colonial dominions. The CIA estimated American supremacy to be best served by supporting the Democratic left. Thus, the program was begun to support more moderate and especially anti-Soviet leftists, thereby helping to purge the social democratic left of Soviet sympathizers.

Consequently, Braden's efforts were guided toward promoting anti-Soviet left-wing elements in groups such as the AFL-CIO. Eventually, despite heavy resistance from British and French allies, the CIA made the leap toward recruiting disaffected anti-Soviet ex-communists, especially in international labor unions. Thus, from 1951 to 1954, the CIA provided $1 million a year through Braden to Irving Brown, a moderate labor leader, and it eventually recruited as an officer Jay Lovestone, a noted former communist follower of Nikolai Bukharin, who had been executed by Stalin in 1938. The CIA helped him financially to run his network with $1.6 million in 1954 (equivalent to approximately $19,182,156 in 2025 dollars).

After Ramparts, the flagship publication of the New Left, broke the story of the CIA's funding of anticommunist citizen groups like the National Student Association in a 1967 article, Braden defended the agency's covert work in the student and labor movements with an article, "I'm Glad the CIA is 'Immoral,'" in The Saturday Evening Post.

== Politics, government, and journalism ==
Braden left the CIA in November 1954 and became owner of the Oceanside Blade-Tribune, a daily newspaper in California, which he bought with a loan from his friend Nelson Rockefeller. Active in California Democratic politics, he served as president of the California State Board of Education during the 1960s, and had a running battle with conservative Republican state superintendent of public instruction Max Rafferty.

Braden himself ran for office only once, mounting an unsuccessful primary challenge in 1966 (with the campaign theme "Guts") to incumbent Democratic lieutenant governor Glenn Anderson.

In 1967, Braden sold the Blade-Tribune to Howard Publications.

After the assassination in Los Angeles of his friend Robert F. Kennedy during the 1968 presidential campaign, Braden returned to Washington and became a popular newspaper columnist in partnership with Kennedy's press secretary, Frank Mankiewicz. He also became a prominent political commentator on radio and television.

Although the Nixon White House initially included him on a list of friendly journalists, his work eventually landed him on the master list of Nixon political opponents.

In 1975, Braden published the autobiographical book Eight is Enough, which inspired an ABC television series of the same name with Dick Van Patten in the role of Tom Bradford, the name of Braden's character in the series. The book focused on his life as the father of eight children and also touched on his political connections as a columnist and ex-CIA operative and as husband to a sometime State Department employee and companion of the Kennedy family, Joan Ridley Braden.

After replacing Mankiewicz as the "voice from the left" on the syndicated radio show Confrontation, Tom Braden co-hosted the Buchanan–Braden Program, a three-hour radio show with former Nixon aide Pat Buchanan from 1978 to 1984. He and Buchanan also hosted the CNN program Crossfire at the show's inception in 1982, with Braden interviewing guests and debating Buchanan and Robert Novak. Braden left Crossfire in 1989.

== Death ==
Braden died of cardiac arrest on April 3, 2009, at his home in Denver, Colorado. He was predeceased by his wife Joan, who died in 1999, and son Tom, who died in 1994.

== Publications ==
Articles

- "How I Became a Reactionary." Saturday Evening Post (Jan. 4, 1958), p. 25.
- "Why My Newspaper Lied." Saturday Review (Apr. 5, 1958), p. 11.
- "I'm Glad the CIA is 'Immoral.'" Saturday Evening Post (May 20, 1967), pp. 10, 12, 14.
- "What's Wrong With the CIA?" Saturday Review (Apr. 5, 1975), pp. 14–18.
- "The Birth of the CIA." American Heritage, vol. 28, no. 2 (Feb. 1977), pp. 4–13.
- "The Spies Who Came in From the Cold War: The World Changed. Can the CIA?" Washington Monthly (Mar. 1992), pp. 18–23.

Books

- Sub Rosa: The OSS and American Espionage (with Stewart Alsop). New York: Reynal & Hitchcock (1946).
- Eight is Enough. Greenwich, Conn.: Fawcett Publications (1975). ISBN 978-0449230022. OCLC 3932418.

Book reviews

- Review of Cold Warrior: James Jesus Angleton—The CIA's Master Spy Hunter by Tom Mangold. Washington Monthly (Jun. 1991), p. 56.
