= Tom Sylvester =

American intelligence officer

Deputy Director of the Central Intelligence Agency for Operations
- In office June 2023 – July 2025
- President: Joe Biden; Donald Trump
- Preceded by: David Marlowe
- Succeeded by: Aaron Wegert

Acting Director of the Central Intelligence Agency
- In office January 20, 2025 – January 23, 2025
- President: Donald Trump
- Preceded by: Bill Burns
- Succeeded by: John Ratcliffe

Military service
- Allegiance: United States
- Branch/service: United States Navy
- Unit: United States Navy SEALs

Thomas Sylvester Jr. is a former American intelligence official who had served as deputy director of the Central Intelligence Agency for Operations. He briefly served as the acting director of the CIA in January 2025. He retired later in 2025.

== Biography ==
Sylvester is the son of a Foreign Service officer, and he grew up overseas, attending junior high school in Norway. He served as a United States Navy SEAL.

He later joined the Central Intelligence Agency (CIA). He is a veteran operations official for the CIA and served in several locations overseas, including in the Middle East. According to the CIA's podcast, The Langley Files, Sylvester "played a central role in CIA's efforts to help Ukraine defend itself as Russia’s full-scale invasion commenced" in 2022.

Sylvester rose to the position of Deputy Director for Operations in the summer of 2023, replacing David Marlowe. In this position, Sylvester is head of the Directorate of Operations, thus being the leader of espionage for the agency. In February 2024, Sylvester appeared on the CIA's podcast, speaking publicly for the first time, discussing the importance of human assets in espionage despite the "proliferation of cyberintelligence."

On January 20, 2025, Sylvester was named by President Donald Trump as Acting Director of the CIA, as Trump's nominee for the position, John Ratcliffe, had not yet been confirmed by the Senate. Ratcliffe was confirmed by the Senate on January 23, 2025.

The expectation was that Sylvester's last assignment would be CIA station chief in London, but that did not happen, and he retired instead. According to The New York Times, the reversal followed the publication of excerpts from Tim Weiner's book The Mission, which quoted interviews Sylvester had given interwoven with Weiner's own criticism of Trump-appointed intelligence officials. Weiner suggested Sylvester may have come across as too personally invested in an outright Ukrainian victory over Russia, telling the Times, "Tom Sylvester helped Ukraine survive after Russia invaded, among other achievements. That seems to be one reason why he's been sacrificed." Ratcliffe's advisers disputed this account, telling the Times that Ratcliffe instead wanted a younger, mid-career officer for the post rather than someone nearing retirement; it is unclear who was ultimately selected for the position, as the appointment is classified.

Political offices
Preceded by Bill Burns	Director of the Central Intelligence Agency; Acting; 2025	Succeeded by John Ratcliffe
