= Overseas Internal Security Program =

The Overseas Internal Security Program was a United States Central Intelligence Agency program led by CIA Counterintelligence chief James Jesus Angleton to train military and police officers for secret police work in more than 25 countries. First revealed in a 2007 CIA history, the program trained 771,217 officers and helped create the secret police in Cambodia, Colombia, Ecuador, El Salvador, Guatemala, Iran, Iraq, Laos, Peru, the Philippines, South Korea, South Vietnam, and Thailand. Many of these officers were trained in the School of the Americas in the Panama Canal Zone (later renamed the "Western Hemisphere Institute for Security Cooperation"), including officers who went on to lead "death squads" in their home countries of Honduras and El Salvador.
