= Greg Vogle =

American intelligence officer

Director of the National Clandestine Service
- In office January 29, 2015 – August 2017
- President: Barack Obama; Donald Trump
- Preceded by: Frank Archibald
- Succeeded by: Elizabeth Kimber

Personal details
- Born: 1958 (age 67–68)
- Awards: CIA "Trailblazer" Award (2017); Director's Award for Distinguished Service (2016); Distinguished Career Intelligence Medal (2016); Intelligence Star (2003); Distinguished Intelligence Cross (2002); Other Interagency Honors (Classified)
- Nickname: Spider

Military service
- Branch/service: United States Marine Corps
- Years of service: 1981–1986

Gregory W. Vogle (born 1958) is an American intelligence officer who served as the Director of the National Clandestine Service from January 29, 2015, until August 2017. He is a recipient of the Distinguished Intelligence Cross, the nation's highest intelligence award for valor, often described as a Medal of Honor equivalent, for his actions to defend Afghan President Hamid Karzai and his troops against an attack on their position by the Taliban in Tarinkot, Afghanistan.

== Career ==
After graduating from the Citadel, Vogle served in the United States Marine Corps as an infantry officer from 1981 to 1986. Vogle joined the Central Intelligence Agency in 1986 as a paramilitary operations officer within the CIA's Special Activities Division (SAD) and deployed to Africa, Bosnia, Pakistan and Middle East. He worked with various parties in the United States Intelligence Community, including the United States Department of Defense.

=== Rescue of Hamid Karzai ===
On October 9, 2001 Hamid Karzai entered Afghanistan and linked up with his supporters to seize Tarinkot. Taliban forces launched a counterattack against Karzai's lightly armed forces and he was forced to withdraw. On November 3, Karzai contacted a member of the Special Activities Center, identified only as "Greg V." who immediately acted by linking up Karzai and himself with his joint CIA & DOD team, consisting of 110 CIA officers, 316 Army Special Forces soldiers and 12 JSOC operatives designated as Echo team. From there, they made a nighttime insertion back into Tarinkot. Karzai then went from village to village seeking support to fight against the Taliban. On November 17, a large battle ensued. Several of Karzai's new recruits fled, but Vogle took command and ran between defensive positions shouting, "If necessary, die like men!". The line held and as CIA Director George Tenet said in his book Center of the Storm, "It was a seminal moment. Had Karzai's position been overrun, as appeared likely for much of November 17, the entire future of the Pashtun rebellion in the south could have ended." Vogle was awarded the Distinguished Intelligence Cross, the CIA's highest award for valor, and the equivalent of the Medal of Honor for those in the intelligence community.

Later on December 5, Karzai was leading his resistance force against the Taliban at Khandahar, their capital and one of their last remaining strongholds. Vogle was the lead paramilitary advisor to Karzai in this battle when, as a result of a mistake in calculating an air strike, a bomb was dropped on their position. Vogle threw his body on Karzai and saved his life. The same day Khandahar fell and Karzai was named the interim Prime Minister.

=== Later career ===
Vogle was awarded the Intelligence Star in 2003 for heroism during classified operations in Iraq supporting Operation Iraqi Freedom. Vogle then served as station chief in Kabul, Afghanistan from 2004 to 2006 and 2009 to 2010 with tours at CIA headquarters as deputy chief of a Branch in SAD and chief of Ground Branch within Special Operations Group, Special Activities Division. In January 2015 Vogle was selected as chief of National Clandestine Service, later renamed as Directorate of Operations. After retiring from the CIA in 2017, agency director Gina Haspel selected Elizabeth Kimber, a 34-year career CIA officer, to succeed Vogle.

In November 2020, Vogle was named a volunteer member of the Joe Biden presidential transition Agency Review Team to support transition efforts related to the United States Intelligence Community. Vogle served as a Senior Advisor at McChrystal Group, an advisory firm based in Alexandria, Virginia, from 2017 to 2021. He currently works at Texas A&M University as a Professor of Practice and Director of The Bush School's Intelligence Studies Program.

According to existing and former intelligence officials, General McChrystal had his own preferred candidate for the Chief of Station (COS) job, a good friend and decorated CIA paramilitary officer. The officer had extensive experience in war zones, including two previous tours in Afghanistan with one as the Chief of Station, as well as tours in the Balkans, Baghdad and Yemen. He was well known in CIA lore as "the man who saved Hamid Karzai's life when the CIA led the effort to oust the Taliban from power in 2001". President Karzai was said to be greatly indebted to this officer and was pleased when the officer was named chief of station again. According to interviews with several senior officials, this officer "was uniformly well-liked and admired. A career paramilitary officer, he came to the CIA after several years in an elite Marine unit". This officer is believed to be Vogle.

Vogle now works at the McChrystal Group, a company owned by General McChrystal.
