= Eloise Page =

American intelligence officer

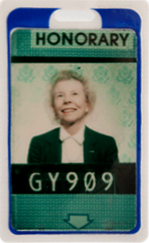
- Page's pass, stored at the CIA Museum
- Born: February 19, 1920; Richmond, Virginia, U.S.
- Died: October 16, 2002 (aged 82); Washington, D.C., U.S.
- Education: Hollins College (BA); George Washington University (BA, MA)
- Employer: Central Intelligence Agency

Eloise Randolph Page (February 19, 1920 – October 16, 2002) was an American Central Intelligence Agency (CIA) officer. She was the first female: Chief of Station (COS), Deputy Director of the Intelligence Community, and Chairman of the Critical Collection Problem Committee.

== Early life ==
Page was born and grew up in Richmond, Virginia to Randolph Rosewell (1884-1951) and Lillian Eloise (1886-1978)(Glyshaw) Page. She had a younger brother, Randolph Jr., (1922-1931) who died in childhood. She learned piano as a child and originally hoped to be a professional musician.

Through her father, she was the six-times great-granddaughter of Colonel John Page, namer of Williamsburg, and founder of the College of William & Mary.

== Education ==
Page attended Hollins College and earned a Master's Degree in political science from George Washington University. Page received an honorary Doctorate of Laws degree from the National Defense University in recognition of "pioneering influence in the field."

== Career ==
Upon graduation, Page worked for the British War Relief Society.

Page began her US intelligence work during World War II in May 1942, working under William J. Donovan, head of the CIA's predecessor, the Office of Strategic Services. She became interested in intelligence work and espionage, and continued into the CIA when it was formed in 1947. In the early 1960s, Page directed Operation Lincoln, a program in which scientists were encouraged to gather technical intelligence during their vacations to the Soviet Union. She progressed to a senior role with the Agency, becoming the CIA's first female station chief in 1978. She was stationed in Athens, Greece, where the previous chief, Richard Welch, had been assassinated three years earlier. She subsequently became the first female Deputy Director of the Intelligence Community staff and chaired the Critical Collection Problems Committee. Within the CIA, she became a well-respected terrorism expert.

In 1987, Page retired, receiving the Distinguished Intelligence Medal. She had been the highest ranking female officer in the CIA since 1975. Following retirement, she continued consulting with the Defense Intelligence Agency on terrorism, and taught at the National Defense University. In 1997, she was one of 50 CIA officers who received a Trailblazer Award for service. Her Trailblazer citation called her "a role model" and "a champion of using technology to solve operational problems".

Page died on October 16, 2002, having never married and without children.

== Legacy ==
During her tenure at the CIA, Page was known for being a "proper Southern woman", wearing white gloves and regularly teaching Sunday school at the Christ Episcopal Church in Georgetown. She was nicknamed the "Iron Butterfly". Though colleagues remembered her as a genteel woman, she could be fierce and demanding when her role required. Her official ID badge is held in the CIA Museum.

A dramatized podcast of the history of the CIA, told from the perspective of Page during her 40-year career at the agency, is produced by the BBC Radio 4. Series 1 launched in September 2024, series 2 following in June 2025, and series 3 in August 2026.

Cast:

- Eloise Page..........Kim Cattrall
- Young Eloise Page..........Elena Delia
- Allen Dulles..........Ed Harris
- Virginia Spence ..........Kelly Marie Tran
- Richard Helms..........Johnny Flynn
- Ed Lansdale..........Stephen Kunken
- Frank Wisner..........Geoffrey Arend
- Lyndon Baines Johnson..........Kelsey Grammer
- Bill Colby..........David Duchovny
- Bob McNamara..........Rob Benedict
- Robert Komer..........Ian Porter
- Dean Rusk..........Joseph Balderrama
