= Distinguished Intelligence Medal =

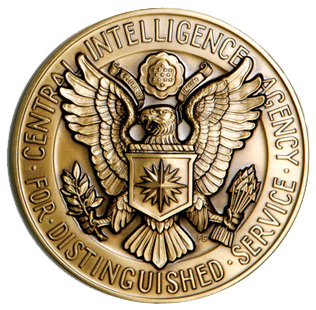
- Awarded for: "For performance of outstanding services or for achievement of a distinctly exceptional nature in a duty or responsibility, the results of which constitute a major contribution to the mission of the Agency."
- Country: United States of America
- Presented by: Central Intelligence Agency
- Eligibility: Employees of the Central Intelligence Agency

Precedence
- Next (higher): Distinguished Intelligence Cross
- Next (lower): Intelligence Star
- Related: National Intelligence Distinguished Service Medal

The Distinguished Intelligence Medal is awarded by the U.S. Central Intelligence Agency for performance of outstanding services or for achievement of a distinctly exceptional nature in a duty or responsibility.

== Recipients ==
This list includes only those publicly acknowledged to have received this award. Due to the nature of the clandestine services, an unknown number of additional individuals may have been awarded this medal in secret for actions on classified missions.

- James Jesus Angleton
- Milt Bearden
- Gary Berntsen
- Cofer Black
- John W. Coffey
- Charles Cogan
- William Colby
- Henry A. Crumpton
- Ruth A. David
- Jack Devine
- James B. Donovan
- John T. Downey
- Jack G. Downing
- Carl Duckett (twice received)
- Major General Michael E. Ennis, USMC
- Fritz Ermarth
- David Forden
- Robert Gates
- Clair George
- Burton Gerber
- Major General Edward B. Giller, USAF
- Sidney Gottlieb
- Gardner Hathaway
- Richard Helms
- Richard L Holm
- John R. Horton
- Robert M. Huffstutler
- Clarence Leonard Johnson
- John Anthony Jordan
- Mark Kelton
- Richard Kerr
- George Kisevalter
- Ryszard Kukliński
- George V. Lauder
- Charles M. Letterman
- Arthur C. Lundahl
- George E. Meloon
- William Mosebey Jr.
- Eloise Page
- Major General Vang Pao
- James Pavitt
- Thomas Polgar
- Jose A. Rodriguez Jr
- John R. Sano
- Gary Schroen
- Winston M. Scott
- Theodore Shackley
- Peter Max F. Sichel
- Sidney D. Stembridge
- Richard Stolz Jr.
- Admiral William O. Studeman, USN
- Michael J. Sulick
- John H. Waller
- William H. Webster
- Samuel V. Wilson
- Alan Wolfe (1928–2004), twice received

CIA medals are sometimes referred to as "jock strap medals" since they are often awarded secretly (due to the classification level of the respective operation) and cannot be displayed or, on occasion, acknowledged publicly.

== See also ==
- Awards and decorations of the United States government
