= William Mosebey Jr. =

William Mosebey is a former career CIA officer and chief of station in four countries. On March 29, 1996, Director of Central Intelligence John Deutch awarded him the Central Intelligence Agency's Distinguished Intelligence Medal.

After retiring in 1995, Moseby returned to CIA following the September 11, 2001 attacks.

== See also ==
- List of CIA station chiefs
