= Operation Lincoln =

Operation Lincoln may refer to:

- Operation Lincoln (Cold War)
- Operation Lincoln (Vietnam War)
