= Mark Kelton =

American intelligence official

Mark E. Kelton is a former senior executive of the Central Intelligence Agency, concluding his career with the position of Deputy Director of the National Clandestine Service for Counterintelligence (DDNCS/CI).

He is currently an adjunct assistant professor at Georgetown University, and Director of Threat Insider Solutions at Cipher Systems, LLC.

== Education ==
Kelton obtained a B.A. in political science from the University of New Hampshire. Kelton obtained an M.A. degree in National Security Affairs from the U.S. Naval War College, and another MA from the Fletcher School of Law and Diplomacy.

== Career ==
Kelton's career at the Central Intelligence Agency was primarily in the realm of counterintelligence, and he spent 16 years performing overseas service. He also served as an executive assistant to Deputy Director for Operations Jack G. Downing.

By the mid-2000s, Kelton was the chief of the European Division of the National Clandestine Service.

=== Pakistan Station Chief ===
Kelton was the CIA's station chief in Pakistan during the 2011 raid which killed Osama bin Laden. Kelton believes he was poisoned by the Inter-Services Intelligence in retaliation for the raid, forcing him to leave due to a medical emergency.

=== Compromise of CIA Networks in China ===
While investigating the 2010-2012 compromise of CIA agents in China, Kelton was initially opposed to the theory that the compromises were caused by a mole, recalling the wrongful suspicions that had taken place during the search for mole Robert Hanssen in the 1990s.

== Awards and commendations ==
Over his career, Kelton was awarded the Distinguished Intelligence Medal, the National Intelligence Distinguished Service Medal, the Intelligence Medal of Merit, the Exceptional Collector Award.
