= Richard Calder =

Richard Calder (1943 – 3 November 2014) was a senior official at the United States Central Intelligence Agency (CIA).

Calder held a Bachelor's degree in political science from the University of Connecticut and a master's degree in information systems from George Washington University. He was a United States Navy radio operator. From 1966, he was as communications officer in the CIA Directorate of Administration (DA) Office of Communications (OC). It was in this role that he found himself trapped for several days inside the CIA's base in Benghazi, Libya, during riots in the wake of the 1967 Arab-Israeli war. His chief at the time was Thomas Twetten, who rose to become deputy director for operations (DDO).

Calder served in numerous roles within the CIA, including Directorate of Operations (DO) case officer, deputy chief of the DO Near East Division (NE) for Arab operations, and chief of DO Operations and Resource Management Staff.

In late 1995, then-CIA Director John M. Deutch made Calder an offer to run the DA, of whose inefficiencies he had been sharply critical, with a free hand. Against nearly universal resistance among his own directorate's leadership, Calder instituted activity-based costing and a working-capital fund, returning the majority of his directorate's budget back to the operational units and requiring his directorate to offer its services on a reimbursable basis. The net result was a freeing up of significant resources for use in the Agency's main operational and analytic missions.

He retired from the CIA in 2001. That year he was named president of Abraxas Corporation by company founder and former CIA director Richard Helms and served until his retirement in 2008.

Calder was married with two children and lived in Vienna, Virginia. He died from a heart attack.
