= Matthew Gannon =

CIA officer

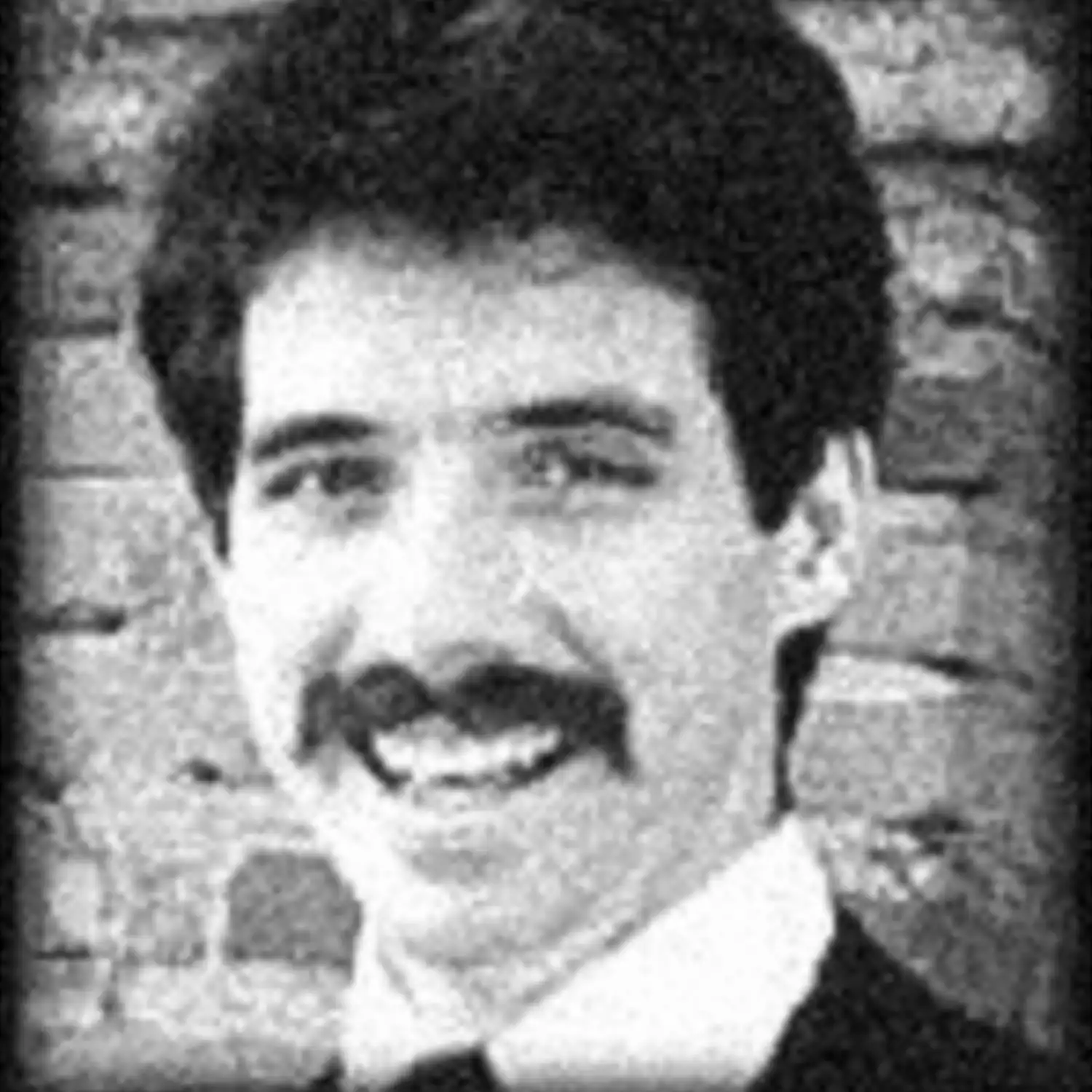
- Born: Matthew Kevin Gannon; August 11, 1954; Orange County, California, US
- Died: December 21, 1988 (aged 34); Lockerbie, Scotland
- Cause of death: Aircraft disintegration due to terrorist bombing
- Occupation: CIA officer
- Known for: Victim of Pan Am Flight 103
- Spouse: Susan Twetten

Matthew Kevin Gannon (August 11, 1954 – December 21, 1988) was an American intelligence officer who worked for the Central Intelligence Agency (CIA). He was killed in the bombing of Pan Am Flight 103 over Lockerbie, Scotland, in 1988.

== Early life and family ==
Gannon was one of ten children. He was raised in San Juan Capistrano, California and St. Michael's Preparatory School (Silverado, California). During high school, he worked at Mission San Juan Capistrano, among other jobs. He attended the University of Southern California and graduated in 1976. After college, he worked as a loan manager for Nationwide Financial.

He married Susan Twetten, daughter of Thomas Twetten (later Deputy Director of Operations at CIA). Matthew and Susan met while her father was Matthew's immediate supervisor.

== Career ==
Gannon worked for the CIA. He was an Arabist who spent much of his career serving in the Middle East. In 2000, Ted Gup included in a book that Gannon had been returning from an undercover mission in Beirut for the CIA. In May 2012, the CIA officially confirmed that Gannon had been a CIA officer. He was a close friend of future CIA Director William J. Burns. Gannon served with Burns in Amman in the early 1980s.

=== Diplomatic postings ===
- Yemen 1979
- Jordan 1981
- Syria 1984–1987
- Lebanon 1988

== Death and memorial ==
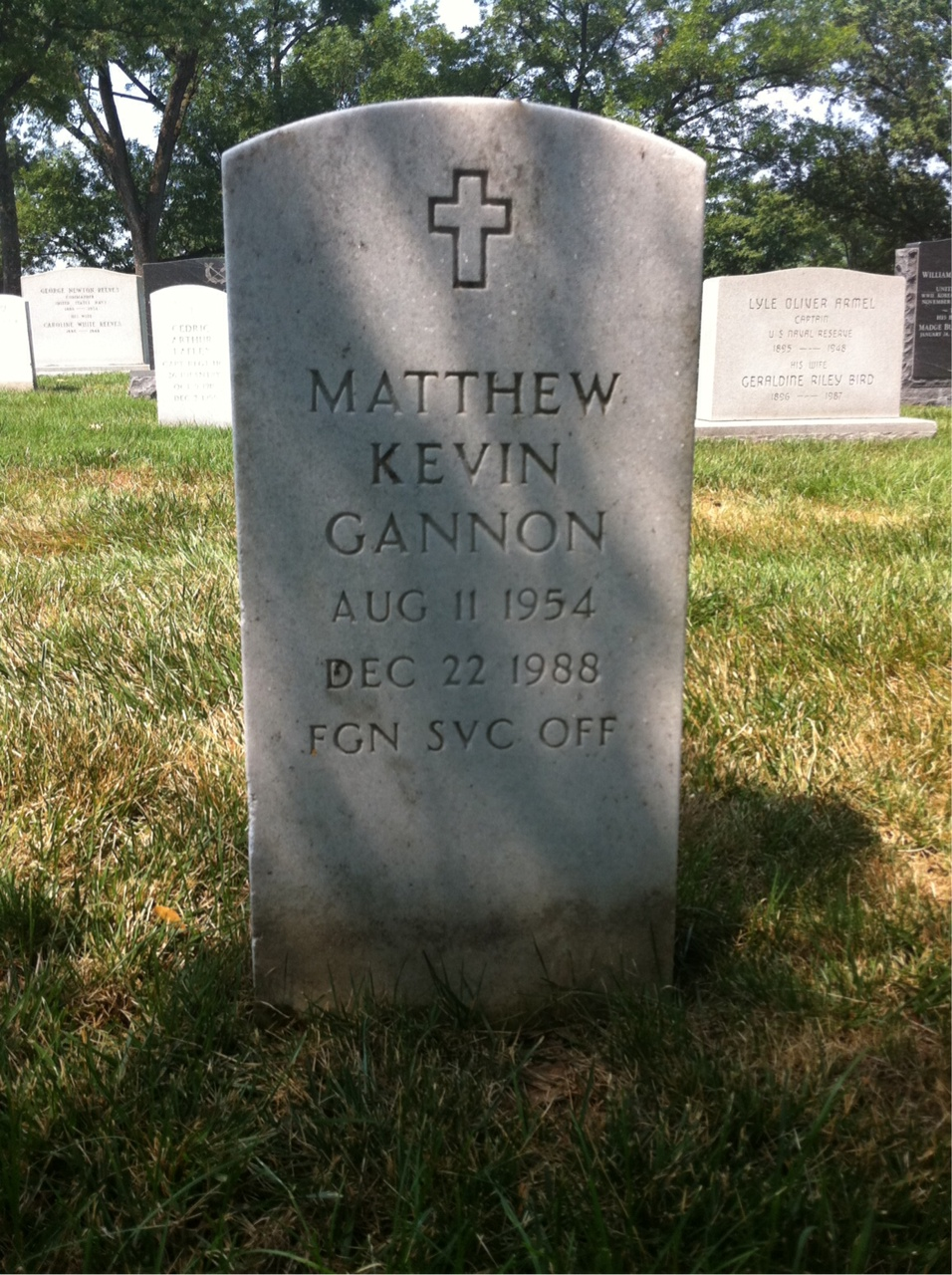
Grave at Arlington National Cemetery

During the aircraft bombing, he was seated in seat 14J. He is buried at Arlington National Cemetery and honored with a star on the CIA Memorial Wall.

In 2001, Abdelbaset al-Megrahi was convicted of 270 counts of murder in connection with the bombing and was sentenced to life imprisonment; his co-accused, Lamin Khalifah Fhimah, was acquitted.

== Bibliography ==
- Bainerman, J. The Crimes of a President. 1992 (205-6)
- Chasey, W. Pan Am 103: The Lockerbie Cover Up. 1995 (350)
- Covert Action Information Bulletin 1990-#34 (42)
- Geheim Magazine (Germany) 1988-#9 (33)
- Goddard, D. Coleman, L. Trail of the Octopus. 1993 (83, 85, 143)
- Gup, T. The Book of Honor. 2000 (311)
- Intelligence Newsletter (Paris) 1989-03-29 (1)
- Intelligence Newsletter (Paris) 1989-07-19 (5)
- Nair, K. Devil and His Dart. 1986 (119)
- Perry, M. Eclipse. 1992 (161-4, 167-70, 176-7)
- Thomas, K. Keith, J. The Octopus. 1996 (93)
- Time 1992-04-27 (31)
- Washington Times 1988-12-26 (A8)
- West, N. Games of Intelligence. 1990 (12)
