= Birch O'Neal =

American CIA station chief in Guatemala

Birch Dilworth O'Neal (c.1913 – August 28, 1995) was the CIA station chief in Guatemala in 1953, succeeding Collins Almon. When the CIA began Operation PBSuccess, whose goal was to overthrow Guatemalan president Jacobo Arbenz, O'Neal objected, so director Allen Dulles transferred him out so that the operation could proceed.

O'Neal was born in Bainbridge, Georgia.
