= Exceptional Collector Award =

The DCI Exceptional Collector National HUMINT Award is a decoration awarded annually by the U.S. Director of Central Intelligence to recognize individuals and groups for improved Human Intelligence (HUMINT) collection and reporting of information that is of significant value to the U.S. intelligence community.

== Notable Recipients ==
- Ambassador J. Cofer Black, Former Director of the CIA's Counterterrorist Center (1994)
- Lt. Col. Roger S. Dong. US Military attache, Taiwan (1996)
- Staff Sergeant Edwin Rodriguez Pazo. US Army. (1992)
- Special Agent Ronald T.Guerin. East Asia Section, Counterintelligence Division, FBI. (1991)
- Jonathan Hilyard, Task Force 168, Office of Naval Intelligence (1993)
- CWO-4 David E. Mann. US Army Counterintelligence Agent, Central America, (1995?)
- Jonathan Hilyard, DH-4, Defense HUMINT Service, Defense Intelligence Agency (1995)
- Ambassador Carol A. Rodley, US Ambassador to Cambodia
- Ivan and Teresa Sarac, Defense Attache Office (Army), US Embassy Belgrade and Zagreb. The Saracs are the only husband and wife team to have received this award twice
- Marc J. Sievers, Political Officer Mission, U.S. Embassy to Egypt, (198?)
- Mark Kelton, former Deputy Director of the National Clandestine Service for Counterintelligence.
