= Gardner Hathaway =

American CIA official (1925–2013)

Gardner Rugg "Gus" Hathaway (March 13, 1925 – November 20, 2013) was from 1985 to 1990 chief of the CIA's Counterintelligence Staff and its Counterintelligence Center successor.

== Background ==
Born in Norfolk, Virginia in 1925, Hathaway grew up in Danville, Virginia, after his father died when he was 2. During US Army service in World War II he was wounded by shrapnel. After being discharged he attended the University of Virginia, graduating in 1950.

== Career ==
After joining the Central Intelligence Agency in October 1951, Hathaway worked as a case officer in Germany, in Frankfurt and Berlin, for ten years, before moving to South America for nine. He was appointed Moscow Chief of Station in 1977. Shortly after moving to Moscow, Hathaway persuaded his superiors to take on Adolf Tolkachev as an asset, at a time when the Agency was wary of KGB counter-intelligence operations and anxious to protect bilateral relations. Tolkachev provided a highly useful stream of information until his arrest in 1985 due to information provided by CIA defector Edward Lee Howard.

In 1985 Hathaway was appointed Chief of Counterintelligence. Suspecting a mole due to the loss of several Soviet agents that year, Hathaway launched an investigation which culminated in the exposure in 1994 of Aldrich Ames, several years after Hathaway's retirement. Hathaway's failure to uncover Ames meant he was one of eleven serving and retired CIA officers reprimanded when Ames was arrested. Hathaway retired in 1990, and was awarded the Distinguished Intelligence Medal.
