= Thomas Twetten =

American CIA officer

Thomas Alan Twetten (born 1935) is a Central Intelligence Agency case officer. From 1991 to 1993, he was Deputy Director of Operations (DDO).

== Early life ==
Twetten grew up in the town of Spencer, Iowa. He graduated with a degree in psychology from Iowa State University in 1957, where he was a member of the Army R.O.T.C. After graduation, he became a military intelligence officer and received a masters from Columbia University.

== Career ==
In 1962, he worked for the United States State Department in Lagos, Nigeria as a political officer.

He was posted to Benghazi, Libya during the 1967 Arab–Israeli war, where he was the chief of base. There, he developed a friendship with Richard Calder, who went on to become Deputy Director of Administration (DDA) in 2001. From 1979 to 1982, Twetten served as station chief in Amman, Jordan. In 1983, he became deputy chief of the C.I.A.'s Near East and South Asia Division and was promoted to chief in 1986. In December of 1988, his son-in-law Matthew Gannon, a CIA officer, was killed in the Pan Am Flight 103 bombing.

In 1988, Twetten was head of the Near East Division of the CIA's Directorate of Operations. He had a significant impact on the events in Afghanistan immediately before the Soviet Union's withdrawal. He later described former president Bill Clinton as "personally afraid of any connection with the CIA".

On January 1, 1991, Twetten became the Deputy Director of Operations. His final assignment was station chief in London, United Kingdom from 1993 to 1995.

After his retirement from the CIA, Twetten became an antique-book seller in Vermont.
