= Elizabeth Kimber =

Former CIA director, corporate executive

Elizabeth Kimber is an American former intelligence official.

== Early life ==
A 1984 graduate of Hamilton College, Kimber majored in French and history. She went on to the Harvard Business School Advanced Management Program.

== Career ==
Kimber started at the CIA in January 1985. Along the way, she was promoted to DNI Representative, Chief of Station, Deputy Director of the National Clandestine Service and Acting Deputy Director of the CIA and was the first CIA Assistant Director for Europe and Eurasia.

Gina Haspel, then serving as Director of the Central Intelligence Agency, nominated Kimber to be Deputy Director of Operations as well as Sonya Holt as the Chief Diversity and Inclusion Officer and Cynthia “Didi” Rapp to be Deputy Director for Analysis. As a result, the top three directorates were headed by women. After 37 years of service at the Central Intelligence Agency, she left the CIA in 2022 to become Vice President of Intelligence Community Strategy at Two Six Technologies.
