= Jack Devine =

CIA veteran

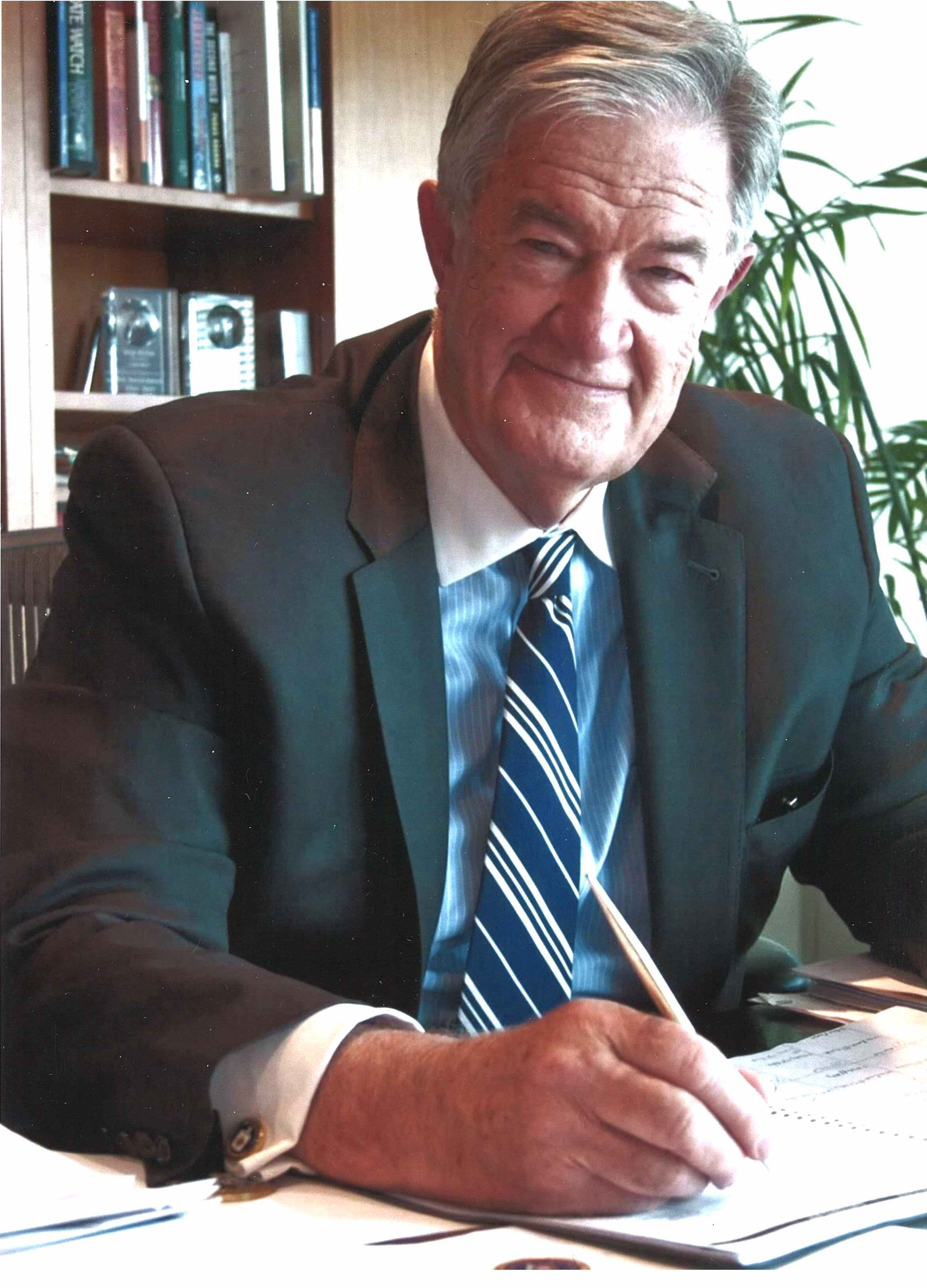
- Jack Devine
- Born: 1940 (age 85–86)
- Occupation: CIA veteran

Jack Devine (born 1940, Philadelphia, Pennsylvania) is a veteran of the Central Intelligence Agency (CIA) and a founding partner and President of The Arkin Group LLC.

== Biography ==
Devine's career at the CIA spanned from the late 1960s to the early 1990s, including the fall of President Salvador Allende in Chile in 1973, the Iran–Contra affair in the mid-1980s, and the fight to push the Soviets out of Afghanistan in the late 1980s. Devine retired after serving as both the acting director and associate director of the CIA's operations outside the United States, a capacity in which he had supervisory authority over thousands of CIA employees involved in sensitive missions throughout the world, as well as Acting Deputy Director of Operations from May 3, 1995, to July 18, 1995.

Devine joined the CIA in 1967, after his wife gave him a book about the CIA and its role in U.S. national security. Devine completed his training at "the Farm" and various other espionage and paramilitary courses. In his first Headquarters assignment he spent time as a "documents analyst" where he shared close quarters with Aldrich "Rick" Ames, who later became a spy for the Soviet Union. Ames would later reemerge as an employee and suspect in the hunt for a mole within the Agency.

His first overseas assignment was to Santiago, Chile in August, 1971. Devine learned the ins and outs of recruiting sources and running covert action operations in the time before the 1973 Chilean coup d'état.

His service on the Afghan Task Force was perhaps the pinnacle of his varied career, and put him at the head of the largest covert action campaign of the Cold War. At the Afghan Task Force, Devine succeeded Gust Avrakotos and inherited a program funnelling hundreds of millions of dollars to the Afghan mujahideen. It was under Devine that the CIA ramped up threefold support to the mujahideen and made the critical decision to provide them with U.S.-made Stinger anti-aircraft missiles, a move that would ultimately shift the course of the war and force a Soviet retreat. By the time Devine left the Task Force for an assignment as Chief of Station in Rome, the war was winding down.

Devine would go on to run the Counter Narcotics Center and Latin America Division at CIA in the 1990s, and helped oversee the operation that captured Pablo Escobar in 1993. He also served as the head of the division during the military intervention in Haiti in the early 1990s, and was later promoted to associate director and acting director of Operations as well as serving as Acting Deputy Director of Operations from May 3, 1995, to July 18, 1995. Devine retired from CIA in 1999, after 32 years, and joined the private sector where he joined forces with New York litigation attorney Stanley Arkin. Together they have provided high-end consulting services along with sophisticated international intelligence and investigative services for the last 23 years.

Devine is the recipient of the Agency's Distinguished Intelligence Medal and several meritorious awards. He is a recognized expert in intelligence matters and has written op-eds and articles for The Washington Post, The Financial Times, The Miami Herald and The World Policy Journal. He has also made guest appearances on CBS, NBC, MSNBC, Fox News, as well as the History and Discovery channels, PBS and ABC Radio. On June 13, 2014, speaking in McLean, VA to former intelligence officers he predicted the likely partition of Iraq and further troubles in Afghanistan and Ukraine.

Devine resides in New York City and is a member of the Council on Foreign Relations.
