= Michael Sulick =

American Central Intelligence Agency officer

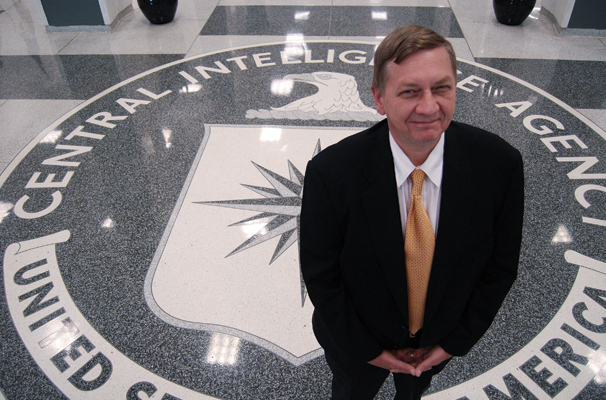

Director of the National Clandestine Service
- In office September 30, 2007 – July 30, 2010
- President: George W. Bush; Barack Obama
- Preceded by: Jose Rodriguez
- Succeeded by: John Bennett

Personal details
- Born: 1948 (age 77–78) New York City, New York, U.S.
- Education: Fordham University (BA, MA); CUNY Graduate Center (PhD)

Michael J. Sulick (born 1948) is an American intelligence officer who served as Director of the U.S. National Clandestine Service from 2007 to 2010.

Sulick, who grew up in the Bronx, studied Russian language and literature at Fordham University and later earned his Ph.D. from the Graduate Center of the City University of New York. He also served as a Marine during the Vietnam War.

Sulick joined the Central Intelligence Agency (CIA) in 1980. He was stationed overseas throughout his career, in Eastern Europe, Asia, Latin America, Poland, and Russia. Sulick served as Moscow Station chief from 1994 to 1996 and Chief of Central Eurasian Division from 1999 to 2002. Sulick served as the Associate Deputy Director of clandestine service for a short time in 2004 under Director Porter J. Goss. He parted ways with the CIA in November 2004 during a management change and leadership turmoil at the agency.

On September 14, 2007, Sulick rejoined the CIA to replace Jose Rodriguez as the head of the clandestine service. Sulick retired in July 2010.

Government offices
Preceded by Jose Rodriguez	Director of the National Clandestine Service; 2007–2010	Succeeded by John Bennett
