= Operation Lincoln (Cold War) =

Operation Lincoln was a CIA program in which travelers to the Soviet Union would be briefed before a trip to the USSR, then debriefed after they returned.

Operation Lincoln began in the late 1950s. In the first phase, the CIA trained scientists to conduct espionage in the Soviet Union. They had difficulty recruiting useful participants, particularly as many scientists were concerned with the potential impact on their careers of "spying". From the 4,000 travelers that they screened, the CIA selected participants who spoke the native language, particularly those with technical and scientific backgrounds. Seventy civilian agents were sent to the USSR in 1959 to gather information on Soviet rocketry. In 1960, another 100 agents were dispatched. This first phase enabled the CIA to map a previously unknown network of antiaircraft missiles.

The 1960 U-2 incident influenced the Soviet Union to enact policies such as restricting photography by tourists. As a result, in 1961, the CIA began the second phase of Operation Lincoln, which they defined as "friendly conversation to the point of revealing something useful." Directed by Eloise Page, scientists were encouraged to gather technical intelligence during their vacations to the Soviet Union. Page insisted that the scientists use no hidden cameras or secret notes. The CIA conducted extensive background checks on all participants to verify that they were suited for the operation and to ensure that no Soviet agents became involved. One volunteer participant was John Steinbeck, however Page wanted the operation to concentrate on scientists.

The Operation Lincoln "tourists" received briefings and counterintelligence training before their travels. Each participant was provided with background information on the Soviet scientists they might meet. Of the 55 participants screened in 1960, 34 brought back intelligence on air defense missile sites, flight routes, and technical details about missile weaponry. Operation Lincoln had become one of the most successful programs for obtaining intelligence about the Soviets.
