= Jose Rodriguez (intelligence officer) =

American spy (born 1948)

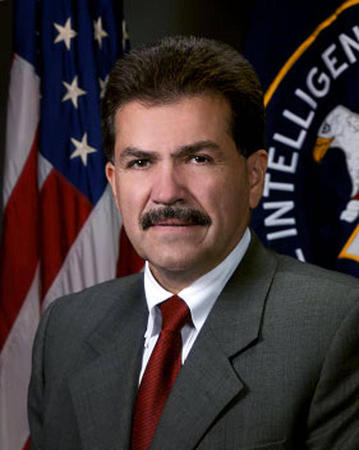

Director of the National Clandestine Service
- In office November 16, 2004 – September 30, 2007
- President: George W. Bush
- Preceded by: Stephen Kappes
- Succeeded by: Michael Sulick

Personal details
- Born: October 21, 1948 (age 78) Puerto Rico
- Education: University of Florida (BA, JD)

Jose A. Rodriguez Jr. (born October 21, 1948) is an American former intelligence officer who served as director of the National Clandestine Service of the Central Intelligence Agency (CIA). He was the final CIA deputy director for operations (DDO) before that position was expanded to D/NCS in December 2004. Rodriguez was a central figure in the 2005 CIA interrogation videotapes destruction, leading to The New York Times editorial board and Human Rights Watch to call for his prosecution.

== Early life and education ==
Born in Puerto Rico in 1948, Rodriguez attended the University of Florida, earning both a bachelor's degree and Juris Doctor.

== Career ==
Rodriguez joined the CIA in 1976 and served for 31 years. According to retired General Michael Hayden, "Jose built a reputation for leadership in the field and here at headquarters, and he guided some of the agency's greatest counterterror victories. He has done much to protect our country by strengthening its Clandestine Service."

Much of his career was as an officer under the Directorate of Operations in the Latin America division, assigned to work in countries ranging from Peru to Belize. From 1994 to 1996, he worked under the guise of military attache at the U.S. Embassy in Buenos Aires. Over time, he was promoted to chief of station in Panama, Mexico, and the Dominican Republic, and subsequently chief of Latin America Division. He was removed from the post in 1997 after an incident where he intervened to help a friend who had been arrested on drug charges in the Dominican Republic. In 1999, he transferred to Mexico City, where he again served as a station chief.

Shortly after the September 11 attacks, Rodriguez was appointed chief operating officer of the Counterterrorism Center. In May 2002, Rodriguez was promoted to the post of director of the Counterterrorism Center. The Counterterrorism Center brings together case officers, operators, analysts, and technologists to work on preventing terrorism. In this capacity, Rodriguez was responsible for driving the CIA operations and the targeting analysis necessary to uncover terrorists in the Al Qaeda network. In the time period that Rodriguez was there, the Counterterrorism Center grew sharply. The number of analysts quadrupled, and the number of operations officers doubled. In 2004 Rodriguez advised the organizers of the 2004 Summer Olympics in Athens, including the chief organizer, Gianna Angelopoulos-Daskalaki, on security matters and counterterrorism.

=== CIA/deputy director for operations and head of NCS ===
On November 16, 2004, Rodriguez succeeded Stephen Kappes to become the deputy director for operations. Rodriguez continued in his capacity as the head of CIA clandestine operations, now as director of the National Clandestine Service. In this expanded role, Rodriguez is the chief of all human intelligence gathering (HUMINT) conducted by the U.S. government, including outside agencies. On February 7, 2006, Rodriguez fired Robert Grenier, his successor as director of the Counterterrorism Center, for not being "aggressive" enough in combating terrorism.

=== Issues in CIA career ===
Like many officers in the Latin American Division, during the Iran–Contra affair, Rodriguez was questioned by the FBI about his role in the scandal after allegations of CIA involvement emerged. No charges or actions were brought against him in connection with Iran–Contra.

Much later, in 1997, Rodriguez interceded in the drug-related arrest of a friend in the Dominican Republic, trying to get the Dominican government to drop the charges. According to the New York Times, the CIA's inspector general criticized Rodriguez for a "remarkable lack of judgment."

=== Controversy over destruction of interrogation videotapes ===
In the campaign against al-Qaeda, several senior leaders in the organization were captured by the CIA in 2002. They were subjected to what has been described as torture or enhanced interrogation techniques, according to the U.S. government. The interrogations of two of the captives were videotaped.

In 2005, while head of the Clandestine Service, Rodriguez ordered that videotape recordings of two 2002 CIA interrogations be destroyed. CIA officials initially stated that the recordings were destroyed to protect the identity of the interrogators, after they were no longer of intelligence value to any investigations. "He would always say, 'I'm not going to let my people get nailed for something they were ordered to do,'" said Robert Richer, Rodriguez's deputy, recalling conversations with his boss about the tapes. It was later revealed that the deputy to Kyle Foggo, then executive director of the CIA, wrote in an email that Rodriguez thought "the heat from destroying is nothing compared with what it would be if the tapes ever got into public domain—he said that out of context they would make us look terrible; it would be 'devastating' to us."

The tapes reportedly showed two men held in CIA custody, Abu Zubaydah and Abd al-Rahim al-Nashiri, being subjected to a program of 'enhanced' interrogation techniques that included a procedure called waterboarding. Critics allege these methods amount to torture and the tapes were evidence both protected by court order and the 9/11 Commission. Rodriguez's record has come under scrutiny after it was reported that the destruction of the videotapes was allegedly in defiance of orders from then–CIA director Porter Goss.

Summoned by congressional subpoena, he was excused from a January 16, 2008, House Intelligence Committee hearing on a request from his lawyer, Robert S. Bennett. Rodriguez has requested immunity in exchange for his testimony on the tape recordings. Larry C. Johnson, a former CIA analyst familiar with Rodriguez and the tapes, commented in a December 23, 2007 Sunday Times story that "it looks increasingly as though the decision was made by the White House." He also alleged it is "highly likely" that President George W. Bush saw one of the videos.

After an exhaustive three-year investigation into the destruction of the videotapes of the interrogations (including pictures of the interrogators), the Justice Department announced in November 2010 it would not pursue any charges against Jose Rodriguez. As The Washington Post reported, "Robert S. Bennett, an attorney for Rodriguez, said he is 'pleased that the Justice Department has decided not to go forward against Mr. Rodriguez. This is the right decision because of the facts and the law.'" Commentator Glenn Greenwald described the decision as just another in a long line of instances of the Obama White House granting legal immunity to Bush-era crimes.

Rodriguez continues to work in the private sector and provided interviews to Time in the aftermath of the death of Osama bin Laden.

The New York Times Editorial board and Human Rights Watch have called for the prosecution of Rodriguez "for conspiracy to torture as well as other crimes."

== Career after CIA ==
After reportedly being heavily recruited to join the international security firm Blackwater, Rodriguez instead joined the privately owned National Interest Security Company in Fairfax, Virginia, which combined several formerly independent companies. In NISC, Rodriguez was made a senior vice president in Edge Consulting, an intelligence assessment and strategy consulting group. Edge Consulting (now a part of IBM) was founded by Chris Whitlock and Frank Strickland to assess intelligence performance with special emphasis on Iraq and Afghanistan, while also working issues in the broader intelligence community. NISC was purchased by IBM in March 2010. Rodriguez appeared in some press around the acquisition by IBM as part of the rationale for the big firm's purchase of NISC, with its specialization in the intelligence and defense communities.

In 2012, Rodriguez's book Hard Measures was published. It details the story of the campaign against al-Qaeda. This effort, or the CIA's lead portion of it, concerns the capture of a number of the key operational leaders in Al Qaeda's global network. Rodriguez told Time magazine that leads coming from key detainees early in the campaign against al-Qaeda were crucial in ultimately leading to the raid on Osama bin Laden's compound. Rodriguez readily admits the role of other sources and efforts, but argues the impact of the interrogation of senior leaders early on should not be lost. As Time reported directly, "Rodriguez agrees that other events played a role in developing the intelligence on bin Laden's whereabouts. And he says that despite widespread focus on KSM, al Libbi's information was the most important. Both KSM and al Libbi were held at CIA black sites and subjected to enhanced interrogation techniques," Rodriguez says. "Abu Faraj was not waterboarded, but his information on the courier was key." Rodriguez's claims about the efficacy of torture in the manhunt for Osama bin Laden were directly contradicted by the Senate Intelligence Committee report on CIA torture, which reported that targeting of bin Laden's courier, Abu Ahmed al-Kuwaiti, was underway before the use of torture, and that the relevant intelligence was gained from detainees before subjecting them to torture.

== Publications ==
- Rodriguez, Jose A. (2012). Hard Measures. with Bill Harlow. New York: Threshold Editions. ISBN 9781451663471. LCCN 2012003698.

== See also ==
- Intelligence Reform and Terrorism Prevention Act
- National Clandestine Service
- The Report (2019 film)

Government offices
Preceded by Stephen Kappes	CIA Deputy Director for Operations; November 2004 – October 13, 2005	Succeeded by Upgraded
Preceded by Initial Director	Director of the National Clandestine Service; October 13, 2005 – September 30, 2007	Succeeded by Michael Sulick
