= Counterintelligence Mission Center =

Counter-intelligence component of the U.S. Central Intelligence Agency

Counterintelligence Mission Center (CIMC) is the component of the Central Intelligence Agency with primary responsibility for counter-intelligence operations. From 1953 to 1988 it was known as the Counterintelligence Staff and operated within the Directorate of Plans; in 1988 it was succeeded by the Counterintelligence Center. The Counterintelligence Center was transformed into the Counterintelligence Mission Center in 2015.

Heads of CIA Counterintelligence include James Jesus Angleton (from foundation until 1974), George Kalaris (1974 to 1977), B Hugh Tovar (1977-1978), David Blee (1978-1985) and Gardner Hathaway (1985 to 1990).

== See also ==
- X-2 Counter Espionage Branch
