= Office of Policy Coordination =

Former department of the CIA

The Office of Policy Coordination (OPC) was the covert operation wing of the United States Central Intelligence Agency (CIA). Created as a department of the CIA in 1948, it actually operated independently until October 1950. OPC existed until 1 August 1952, when it was merged with the Office of Special Operations (OSO) to form the Directorate of Plans (DDP).

== History ==
OPC was preceded by the Special Procedures Group (SPG), whose creation in March 1948 had been authorized in December 1947 with President Harry Truman's approval of the top-secret policy paper NSC 4-A. SPG was located within the CIA's Office of Special Operations (OSO), the CIA department responsible for intelligence collection, and was first used to influence the Italian election of 1948, a policy success which demonstrated that psychological/political warfare could be the key to winning the Cold War. OSO, the successor to the Strategic Services Unit (SSU), was headed by an Assistant Director for Special Operations (ADSO). CIA's expanded mandate caused jealousy in the State Department and the Department of Defense. When OPC was created, it inherited all of SPG's resources, including more than $2 million. It also acquired funds and labor projects from the Economic Cooperation Administration (ECA).

On 18 June 1948, Truman approved NSC 10/2 which created the Office of Special Projects. George F. Kennan, the director of the State Department's Policy Planning Staff, was the key figure behind its creation. Before the agency started operating on 1 September 1948 it was renamed to the Office of Policy Coordination. The name change was in anticipation of public scrutiny; the new name would better deflect away attention from the covert activities. Frank Wisner from the State Department was chosen to be the first director.

Control over the new entity was highly contentious. Although formally a department of the CIA, it was responsible to the State Department, and DCI Roscoe H. Hillenkoetter (1947–1950) exercised no authority over the OPC. According to the historian Gregory Mitrovich, OPC effectively "became an intelligence apparatus for the departments of state and defense". The OPC was brought under the control of the CIA on 12 October 1950, days after Hillenkoetter was replaced by Walter Bedell Smith, when the new DCI simply announced that he was in charge of the OPC. After taking control over the OPC, Smith became concerned about the size of OPC's covert operations, which had been vastly expanded in accordance with NSC 68. Smith feared that the added responsibility would undermine CIA's primary function, namely the collection of intelligence.

OPC became embroiled in organizational rivalry with OSO, with which there was operational overlap, even though OSO was focused on intelligence collection rather than action. Smith attempted to ameliorate the situation by appointing Allen Dulles on 4 January 1951 to the new position of Deputy Director for Plans (DDP) where he would supervise the two entities. According to Anne Karalekas, a staffer of the Church Committee who wrote a history of the CIA, that was merely a cosmetic change, and it was only on 1 August 1952 that OPC and OSO were properly merged into the Directorate of Plans (DDP). (Note: The Directorate of Plans used the abbreviation of its chief.) Wisner, who had replaced Dulles on 23 August 1951, assumed the command functions of ADSO and ADPC. According to John Prados, the name was intended to disguise its true function.

== Assistant Directors for Policy Coordination ==
The OPC was headed by the Assistant Director for Policy Coordination (ADPC).

Name	Took office	Left office	Note
Frank Wisner	1 September 1948	23 August 1951	Wisner replaced Allen Dulles as DDP on 23 August 1951. Dulles was promoted to DDCI the same day.
Colonel Kilbourne Johnston	23 August 1951	1 August 1952	OPC ceased to exist on 1 August 1952.

== Operational scope ==
Point 5 of the NSC 10/2 defined the scope of "covert operations", which would be overseen by the OPC:

5. As used in this directive, "covert operations" are understood to be all activities (except as noted herein) which are conducted or sponsored by this Government against hostile foreign states or groups or in support of friendly foreign states or groups but which are so planned and executed that any US Government responsibility for them is not evident to unauthorized persons and that if uncovered the US Government can plausibly disclaim any responsibility for them. Specifically, such operations shall include any covert activities related to: propaganda, economic warfare; preventive direct action, including sabotage, anti-sabotage, demolition and evacuation measures; subversion against hostile states, including assistance to underground resistance movements, guerrillas and refugee liberation groups, and support of indigenous anti-communist elements in threatened countries of the free world. Such operations shall not include armed conflict by recognized military forces, espionage, counter-espionage, and cover and deception for military operations.

The OPC grew rapidly during the Korean War. In April 1951, President Truman established the Psychological Strategy Board in order to coordinate all US psychological warfare strategy.

Amongst the propaganda mission the psywar staff carried out was the funding of the 1954 Hollywood production of George Orwell's "Animal Farm", which should portray communist domination in an allegorical way.

== See also ==
- Operation Mockingbird
- Special Activities Center (CIA)
- Directorate of Operations (CIA)
- Carmel Offie
- Charles W. Thayer
- The Belarus secret
