= Deputy Director of the CIA for Operations =

Office in the Central Intelligence Agency (CIA)

The deputy director of the CIA for operations is a senior United States government official in the U.S. Central Intelligence Agency who serves as head of the Directorate of Operations. The position was established December 1, 1950 and from January 4, 1951, until March 1, 1973, it was known as Deputy Director of Plans (DDP). When this unit was known as the Directorate of Plans, it at first accounted for about 75% of the CIA budget and about 60% of the personnel within the CIA.

After staying named the deputy director of plans until 1973, the position was then known as Deputy Director for Operations (DDO) until December 17, 2004 when, under the Intelligence Reform and Terrorism Prevention Act of 2004, the position was renamed to Director of the National Clandestine Service (D/NCS). When David Marlowe was chosen to lead the Directorate of Operations by CIA director William J. Burns in June 2021, media reported his position as being titled Deputy Director of Operations.

== List of Deputy Directors of Operations ==
Name	Start	End	President(s)
Allen Dulles	January 4, 1951	August 23, 1951	Harry S. Truman (1945–1953)
Frank Wisner	August 23, 1951	January 1, 1959	Harry S. Truman (1945–1953)
Frank Wisner	August 23, 1951	January 1, 1959	Dwight D. Eisenhower (1953–1961)
Richard Bissell	January 1, 1959	February 17, 1962	Dwight D. Eisenhower (1953–1961)
Richard Bissell	January 1, 1959	February 17, 1962	John F. Kennedy (1961–1963)
Richard Helms	February 17, 1962	April 28, 1965	John F. Kennedy (1961–1963)
Richard Helms	February 17, 1962	April 28, 1965	Lyndon B. Johnson (1963–1969)
Desmond FitzGerald	June 28, 1965	July 23, 1967	Lyndon B. Johnson (1963–1969)
Thomas Karamessines	July 31, 1967	February 27, 1973	Lyndon B. Johnson (1963–1969)
Thomas Karamessines	July 31, 1967	February 27, 1973	Richard Nixon (1969–1974)
William Colby	March 2, 1973	August 24, 1973	Richard Nixon (1969–1974)
William Nelson	August 24, 1973	May 14, 1976	Richard Nixon (1969–1974)
William Nelson	August 24, 1973	May 14, 1976	Gerald Ford (1974–1977)
William Wells	May 15, 1976	December 31, 1977	Gerald Ford (1974–1977)
William Wells	May 15, 1976	December 31, 1977	Jimmy Carter (1977–1981)
John McMahon	January 11, 1978	April 12, 1981	Jimmy Carter (1977–1981)
John McMahon	January 11, 1978	April 12, 1981	Ronald Reagan (1981–1989)
Max Hugel	May 11, 1981	July 14, 1981	Ronald Reagan (1981–1989)
John Stein	July 14, 1981	July 1, 1984	Ronald Reagan (1981–1989)
Clair George	July 1, 1984	December 1, 1987	Ronald Reagan (1981–1989)
Richard Stolz	January 4, 1988	December 31, 1990	Ronald Reagan (1981–1989)
Richard Stolz	January 4, 1988	December 31, 1990	George H. W. Bush (1989–1993)
Thomas Twetten	January 1, 1991	December 1993	George H. W. Bush (1989–1993)
Thomas Twetten	January 1, 1991	December 1993	Bill Clinton (1993–2001)
Hugh Price	January 1994	1995	Bill Clinton (1993–2001)
David Cohen	1995	1997	Bill Clinton (1993–2001)
Jack G. Downing	1997	July 1999	Bill Clinton (1993–2001)
James Pavitt	August 1999	June 4, 2004	Bill Clinton (1993–2001)
James Pavitt	August 1999	June 4, 2004	George W. Bush (2001–2009)
Stephen Kappes	June 5, 2004	November 15, 2004	George W. Bush (2001–2009)
Jose Rodriguez	November 16, 2004	September 30, 2007	George W. Bush (2001–2009)
Michael Sulick	September 30, 2007	July 30, 2010	George W. Bush (2001–2009)
Michael Sulick	September 30, 2007	July 30, 2010	Barack Obama (2009–2017)
John Bennett	July 30, 2010	February 28, 2013	Barack Obama (2009–2017)
Gina Haspel; Acting	February 28, 2013	May 7, 2013	Barack Obama (2009–2017)
Frank Archibald	May 7, 2013	January 29, 2015	Barack Obama (2009–2017)
Greg Vogle	January 29, 2015	August 2017	Barack Obama (2009–2017)
Greg Vogle	January 29, 2015	August 2017	Donald Trump (2017–2021)
Beth Kimber	December 10, 2018	June 2021	Donald Trump (2017–2021)
Beth Kimber	December 10, 2018	June 2021	Joe Biden (2021–2025)
David Marlowe	June 2021	June 2023	Joe Biden (2021–2025)
Tom Sylvester	June 2023	July 2025	Joe Biden (2021–2025)
Tom Sylvester	June 2023	July 2025	Donald Trump (2025–present)
Aaron Wegert	August 2025	Present	Donald Trump (2025-present)

== Sources ==
- CIA's senior management structure, letter dated July 2, 1991 from William H. Webster, Director of Central Intelligence to U.S. Senator John Glenn, Select Senate Committee on Intelligence.
- "CIA plans riskier, more aggressive espionage," USA Today, November 17, 2004.
- Director Leon E. Panetta Announces New National Clandestine Service Chief, press release dated July 21, 2010.
