= Frank Wisner =

CIA officer (1909–1965)

Deputy Director of the CIA for Operations
- In office August 23, 1951 – January 1, 1959
- President: Dwight D. Eisenhower
- Preceded by: Allen Dulles
- Succeeded by: Richard Bissell

Head of the Office of Policy Coordination
- In office 1 September 1948 – 23 August 1951
- Preceded by: Office Established
- Succeeded by: Kilbourne Johnston

Personal details
- Born: Frank Gardner Wisner; June 23, 1909 Laurel, Mississippi, U.S.
- Died: October 29, 1965 (aged 56) Galena, Maryland, U.S.
- Spouse: Mary Ellis Knowles
- Children: 4
- Education: University of Virginia (BA, LLB)

Military service
- Allegiance: United States
- Branch/service: United States Navy
- Years of service: 1941–1946 (active); 1946–1962 (reserve)
- Rank: Lieutenant commander
- Battles/wars: World War II; Operation Reunion; Cold War; Operation Valuable; Greek resistance in Northern Epirus (1949–1958)

Frank Gardiner Wisner (June 23, 1909 – October 29, 1965) was one of the founding officers of the Central Intelligence Agency (CIA) and played a major role in CIA operations throughout the 1950s.

Wisner began his intelligence career in the Office of Strategic Services in World War II. After the war, he headed the Office of Policy Coordination (OPC), one of the OSS successor organizations, from 1948 to 1950. In 1950, the OPC was placed under the Central Intelligence Agency and renamed the Directorate of Plans. First headed by Allen Dulles, Wisner succeeded Dulles in 1951 when Dulles was named Director of Central Intelligence.

Wisner remained as Deputy Director of Plans (DDP) until September 1958, playing an important role in the early history of the CIA. He suffered a breakdown in 1958, and retired from the Agency in 1962. He committed suicide in 1965.

== Education and early career ==
Wisner was born in Laurel, Mississippi, the son of Mary (Gardiner), a schoolteacher, and Frank George Wisner, a timber magnate. He was educated at the University of Virginia, where he received both a B.A. and a LL.B. degree. He was also tapped for the Seven Society. After graduating from the University of Virginia School of Law in 1934, Wisner began working as a Wall Street lawyer for Carter, Ledyard & Milburn.

== Career ==
=== Navy and OSS career ===
In 1941, six months before the attack on Pearl Harbor, he enlisted in the United States Navy. He worked in the Navy's censor's office until he managed to transfer to the Office of Strategic Services (OSS) in 1943. He was first stationed in Cairo where he spent an uneventful year. After Cairo (from June 15, 1944) he spent three months in OSS Istanbul, Turkey, as head of SI (Secret Intelligence) branch. On August 29, 1944, Lt. Comdr. Wisner and 21 OSS agents landed in Romania, where he became head of OSS Bucharest.

Wisner arrived just as Romania joined the Allies and declared war on the Axis. His first task was to oversee the return of over 1,000 American airmen who had been shot down in missions against Romanian oilfields. The POWs were returned by the Fifteenth Air Force via the Popești-Leordeni Airfield during Operation Reunion. Over 50 B-17 Flying Fortress airplanes flew out the prisoners between August 31 and September 3. In all, some 1,127 American POWs were transported.

Immediately after the arrival of Major Robert Bishop (September 9, 1944) as head of X-2 (Counter Espionage) branch in Bucharest, Wisner started the search for German records. With the help of Romanian Intelligence, they managed to obtain tons of records, including SD files, 200 rolls of German film and a large amount of Soviet information. During that time, Wisner and Bishop discovered and penetrated a Soviet intelligence service named GUGBEZ. Wisner left Bucharest in the last week of January 1945.

In March 1945, Wisner was transferred to Wiesbaden, Germany. In 1945–1946, he returned to law practice at Carter, Ledyard & Milburn.

During World War II, Wisner and his wife Polly became close friends with Philip Graham and his wife Katharine Graham who after the war became publishers of The Washington Post.

=== CIA career ===
Wisner was recruited in 1947 by Dean Acheson to join the State Department to become the Deputy Assistant Secretary of State for Occupied Areas. On June 18, 1948, the United States National Security Council approved NSC 10/2 which created the Office of Special Projects. On September 1, 1948, the office was formally established, although it was renamed to the Office of Policy Coordination (OPC) for obfuscation purposes. Wisner was chosen to lead the OPC in the capacity of Assistant Director for Policy Coordination (ADPC). The OPC initially received services from the CIA but was accountable to the State Department.

According to its secret charter, the OPC's responsibilities include "propaganda, economic warfare, preventive direct action, including sabotage, antisabotage, demolition and evacuation procedures; subversion against hostile states, including assistance to underground resistance groups, guerrillas and refugee liberation groups, and support of indigenous anti-communist elements in threatened countries of the free world."

During the early 1950s, Wisner was the subject of FBI inquiries in connection with his wartime work in Romania, including the claim that he had an affair with Tanda Caradja, daughter of Romanian princess Catherine Caradja during the war; Caradja was alleged in FBI reports to be a Soviet agent. However, Wisner was cleared of all suspicions by the CIA Office of Security.

On August 23, 1951, Wisner succeeded Allen W. Dulles and became the second Deputy Director of Plans, with Richard Helms as his chief of operations. In this position, he was instrumental in supporting pro-American forces that toppled Mohammed Mossadegh in Iran in 1953 and Jacobo Arbenz Guzmán in Guatemala in 1954. Another project he was involved in was with regard to the Belarus Brigade's leaders, a unit incorporated into a German SS division, who were assisted into the United States after World War II, due largely to his efforts. In defiance of federal law, John Loftus asserted, the Office of Policy Coordination helped obtain visas for Nazi collaborators from Belarus — who were believed to have facilitated numerous atrocities by Nazi Germany. According to Loftus, it was all part of a Cold War scheme to wage guerrilla warfare in Soviet-occupied Europe, in which the Nazi collaborators were to play a key role. When the project collapsed, however, the Belarusians quickly settled in and obtained US citizenship – and intelligence agencies protected them from exposure for decades.

FBI director J. Edgar Hoover and U.S. Senator Joseph McCarthy succeeded in forcing CIA director Roscoe H. Hillenkoetter to dismiss long-time staffer Carmel Offie in 1950 for homosexuality, over Wisner's objections.

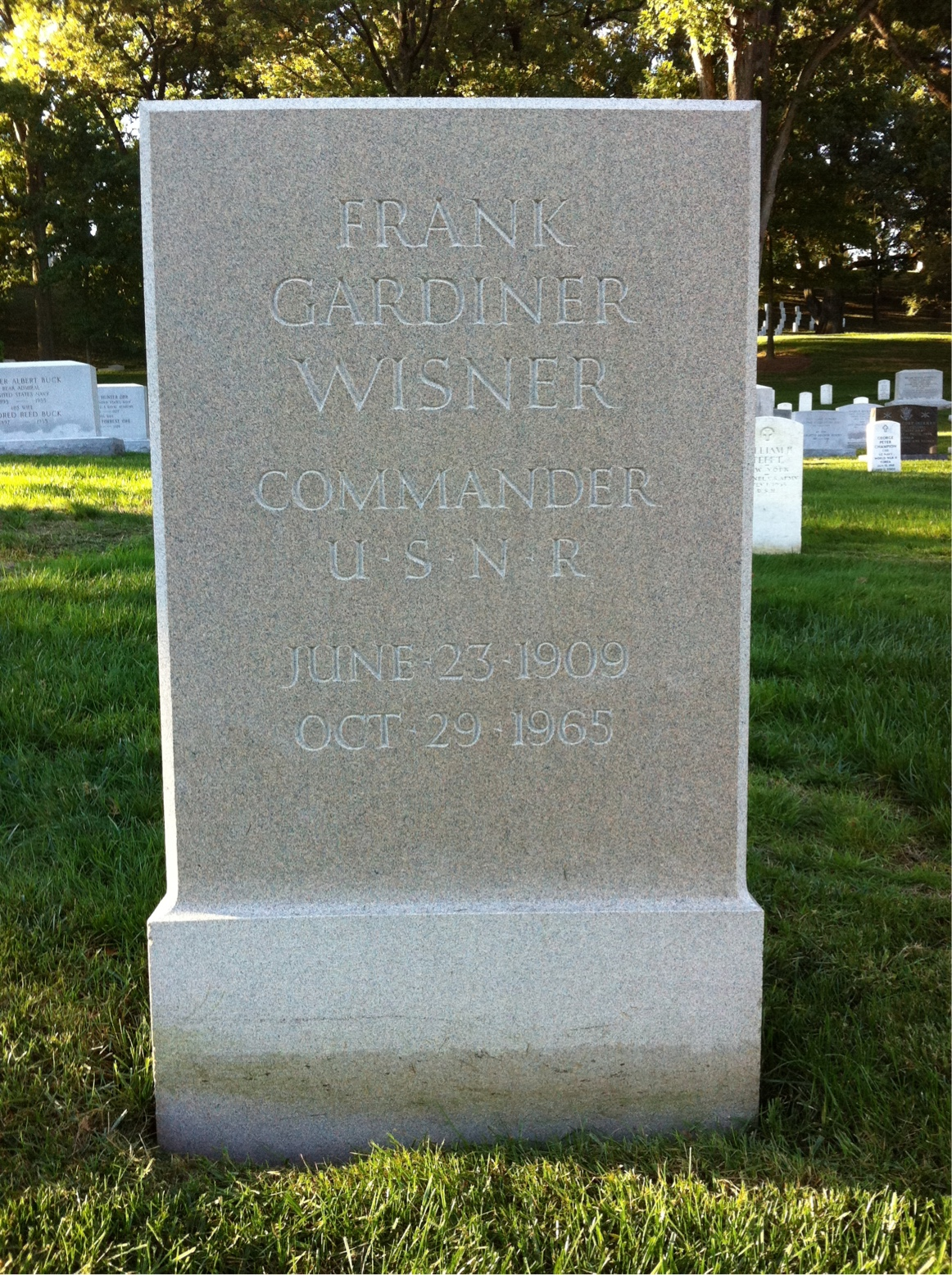
Grave at Arlington National Cemetery

Wisner worked closely with Kim Philby, the British agent who was also a Soviet spy.

Wisner was also deeply involved in establishing the Lockheed U-2 spy plane program run by Richard M. Bissell Jr.

Wisner suffered a serious breakdown in September 1958. He was diagnosed as manic depressive and received electroshock therapy. Bissell replaced Wisner as Deputy Director of Plans. After a lengthy recovery, Wisner became chief of the CIA's London Station.

In 1961, Wisner was ordered to organize CIA activities in British Guiana.

In 1962, Wisner retired from the CIA.

== Personal life and death ==
Wisner married Mary Ellis 'Polly' Knowles (1912–2002) and they had four children: Elizabeth Wisner, Graham Wisner, Ellis Wisner, and Frank G. Wisner who entered into diplomatic service. Wisner died on October 29, 1965, by suicide.

Government offices
Preceded by Allen W. Dulles	Deputy Director for Plans; August 23, 1951 – January 1, 1959	Succeeded by Richard M. Bissell Jr.
