= Directorate of Operations (CIA) =

US clandestine intelligence organization

Agency overview
- Formed: 1951 (as Directorate of Plans)
- Motto: Veritatem Cognoscere (English: "To Know the Truth")
- Agency executive: John Ratcliffe, Director of the Central Intelligence Agency
- Parent department: Central Intelligence Agency
- Website: Directorate of operations

The Directorate of Operations (DO), less formally called the Clandestine Service, is a component of the US Central Intelligence Agency. It was known as the Directorate of Plans from 1951 to 1973; as the Directorate of Operations from 1973 to 2004; and as the National Clandestine Service (NCS) from 2004 to 2015.

The DO "serves as the clandestine arm of the Central Intelligence Agency (CIA) and the national authority for the coordination, de-confliction, and evaluation of clandestine operations across the Intelligence Community of the United States".

== History ==
=== Predecessors ===
The Directorate of Plans was originally conceived to solve organizational rivalry between the Office of Special Operations (OSO) and the Office of Policy Coordination (OPC). There was operational overlap between the two CIA departments, even though OSO was focused on intelligence collection whereas OPC was more focused on covert action. Director of Central Intelligence Walter Bedell Smith attempted to ameliorate the situation by appointing Allen Dulles on January 4, 1951, to the new position of Deputy Director for Plans (DDP) where he would supervise the two entities. According to Anne Karalekas, a staffer of the Church Committee who wrote a history of the CIA, that was merely a cosmetic change, and it was only on August 1, 1952, that OPC and OSO were properly merged to form the Directorate of Plans (DDP). The Directorate of Plans used the abbreviation of its chief. According to John Prados, the name was intended to disguise the true function of the Directorate.

The Directorate was the CIA branch that conducted covert operations and recruited foreign agents. DDP consisted of, among other subdivisions, a unit for political and economic covert action (the Covert Action Staff), for paramilitary covert action (the Special Operations unit), for counterintelligence, and for several geographic desks responsible for the collection of foreign intelligence. On March 1, 1973, DDP became the Directorate of Operations and the director became known as the Deputy Director for Operations (DDO).

The Directorate also housed special groups for conducting counter-narcotics and counter-terrorism, for tracking nuclear proliferation, and other tasks.

=== Approval of clandestine and covert operations ===
Approval of clandestine and covert operations came from a variety of committees, although in the early days of quasi-autonomous offices and the early DDP, there was more internal authority to approve operations. After its creation in the Truman administration, the CIA was, initially, the financial manager for OPC and OSO, authorized to handle "unvouchered funds" by National Security Council document 4-A of December 1947, the launching of peacetime covert action operations. NSC 4-A made the Director of Central Intelligence responsible for psychological warfare, establishing at the same time the principle that covert action was an exclusively Executive Branch function.

==== Early autonomy of OPC ====
Initially, the supervision by committee allowed the OPC to exercise early use of its new covert action mandate, dissatisfying officials at the Departments of State and Defense. The Department of State, believing this role too important to be left to the CIA alone and concerned that the military might create a new rival covert action office in the Pentagon, pressed to reopen the issue of where responsibility for covert action activities should reside. Consequently, on June 18, 1948, a new NSC directive, NSC 10/2, superseded NSC 4-A.

NSC 10/2 directed the CIA to conduct "covert" rather than merely "psychological" operations, defining them as all activities "which are conducted or sponsored by this Government against hostile foreign states or groups or in support of friendly foreign states or groups but which are so planned and executed that any US Government responsibility for them is not evident to unauthorized persons and that if uncovered the US Government can plausibly disclaim any responsibility for them".

NSC 10/2 defined the scope of these operations as:

propaganda; economic warfare; preventive direct action, including sabotage, demolition and evacuation measures; subversion against hostile states, including assistance to underground resistance movements, guerrillas and refugee liberations [sic] groups, and support of indigenous anti-Communist elements in threatened countries of the free world. Such operations should not include armed conflict by recognized military forces, espionage, counter-espionage, and cover and deception for military operations.

Guerrilla warfare was outside this statement of scope, but such operations came under partial CIA control with NSC 10/5 of October 1951. See "Psychological Strategy Board" below. To implement covert actions under NSC 10/2, the OPC was created on September 1, 1948. Its initial structure had it taking guidance from the State Department in peacetime and from the military in wartime, initially had direct access to the State Department and to the military without having to proceed through the CIA's administrative hierarchy, provided the Director of Central Intelligence (DCI) was informed of all important projects and decisions. In 1950 this arrangement was modified to ensure that policy guidance came to OPC through the DCI. During the Korean War, the OPC grew quickly. Wartime commitments and other missions soon made covert action the most expensive and bureaucratically prominent of the CIA's activities.

Concerned about this situation, DCI Walter Bedell Smith in early 1951 asked the NSC for enhanced policy guidance and a ruling on the proper "scope and magnitude" of CIA operations. The White House responded with two initiatives. In April 1951 President Truman created the Psychological Strategy Board (PSB) under the NSC to coordinate government-wide psychological warfare strategy.

Putting special operations under a "psychological" organization paralleled the military's development of U.S. Army Special Forces, which was created by a Pentagon unit called the Psychological Warfare Division. "NSC 10/5, issued in October 1951, reaffirmed the covert action mandate given in NSC 10/2 and expanded CIA's authority over guerrilla warfare" The incoming Eisenhower administration soon abolished the PSB, but the expansion of the CIA's covert action writ in NSC 10/5 helped ensure that covert action would remain a major function of the Agency.

As the Truman administration ended, CIA was near the peak of its independence and authority in the field of covert action. Although CIA continued to seek and receive advice on specific projects ... no group or officer outside of the DCI and the President himself had authority to order, approve, manage, or curtail operations.

==== Increasing control by CIA management ====
After Smith, who was Eisenhower's World War II chief of staff, consolidated the CIA, the OPC and the OSO in 1952, the Eisenhower administration began narrowing the CIA's latitude in 1954. In accordance with a series of National Security Council directives, the Director of Central Intelligence's responsibility for the conduct of covert operations was further clarified. President Eisenhower approved NSC 5412 on March 15, 1954, reaffirming the CIA's responsibility for conducting covert actions abroad". A series of committees, containing representatives from State, Defense, the CIA, and sometimes the White House or NSC, reviewed operations. Over time and reorganizations, these committees were called the Operations Coordinating Board (OCB), NSC 5412/2 Special Group or simply Special Group, Special Group (Augmented), 303 Committee, and Special Group (Counterinsurgency).

=== National Clandestine Service ===
In the aftermath of the September 11 attacks in 2001, a report by the Joint Inquiry into Intelligence Community Activities before and after the Terrorist Attacks of September 11, 2001, conducted by the Senate Select Committee on Intelligence and the House Permanent Select Committee on Intelligence, and the report released by the National Commission on Terrorist Attacks Upon the United States, identified serious shortcomings in the Intelligence Community's HUMINT capabilities, ranging from the lack of qualified linguists to the lack of Community-wide information sharing. These efforts resulted in the passage of the Intelligence Reform and Terrorism Prevention Act in 2004, which created the position of the Director of National Intelligence and tasked the CIA's director with developing a "strategy for improving the human intelligence and other capabilities of the Agency."

In 2004, Senator Pat Roberts, the Senate Intelligence Committee's chairman, drafted the 9/11 National Security Protection Act in which he proposed that the Directorate of Operations be removed from the CIA and established as an independent agency known as the National Clandestine Service (NCS). The NCS' creation was also recommended by the Commission on the Intelligence Capabilities of the United States Regarding Weapons of Mass Destruction. The Commission's investigation found that HUMINT capabilities had been severely degraded since the end of the Cold War and were ill-suited for targeting non-state actors such as terrorist organizations. The Commission also noted that HUMINT operations were poorly coordinated between the various federal entities who conducted them and encouraged the development of better methods of validating human sources, in light of the revelations about the source known as Curveball.

Beginning its study of the Intelligence Community in 1995, a non-governmental group including former National Security Agency director William E. Odom, former Defense Intelligence Agency director Harry E. Soyster, former DIA director and director of National Intelligence James R. Clapper, and former general counsel for the CIA and the NSA Elizabeth Rindskopf Parker, issued a report, first in 1997 and in an updated form in 2002, which recommended the NCS' creation.

The CIA announced the NCS' creation in a press release on October 13, 2005. Contrary to Senator Roberts' proposal, the NCS would be a component of the CIA, rather than an independent executive branch agency.

== Organization ==
See Deputy Director of CIA for Operations for a full list of directors since 1951.

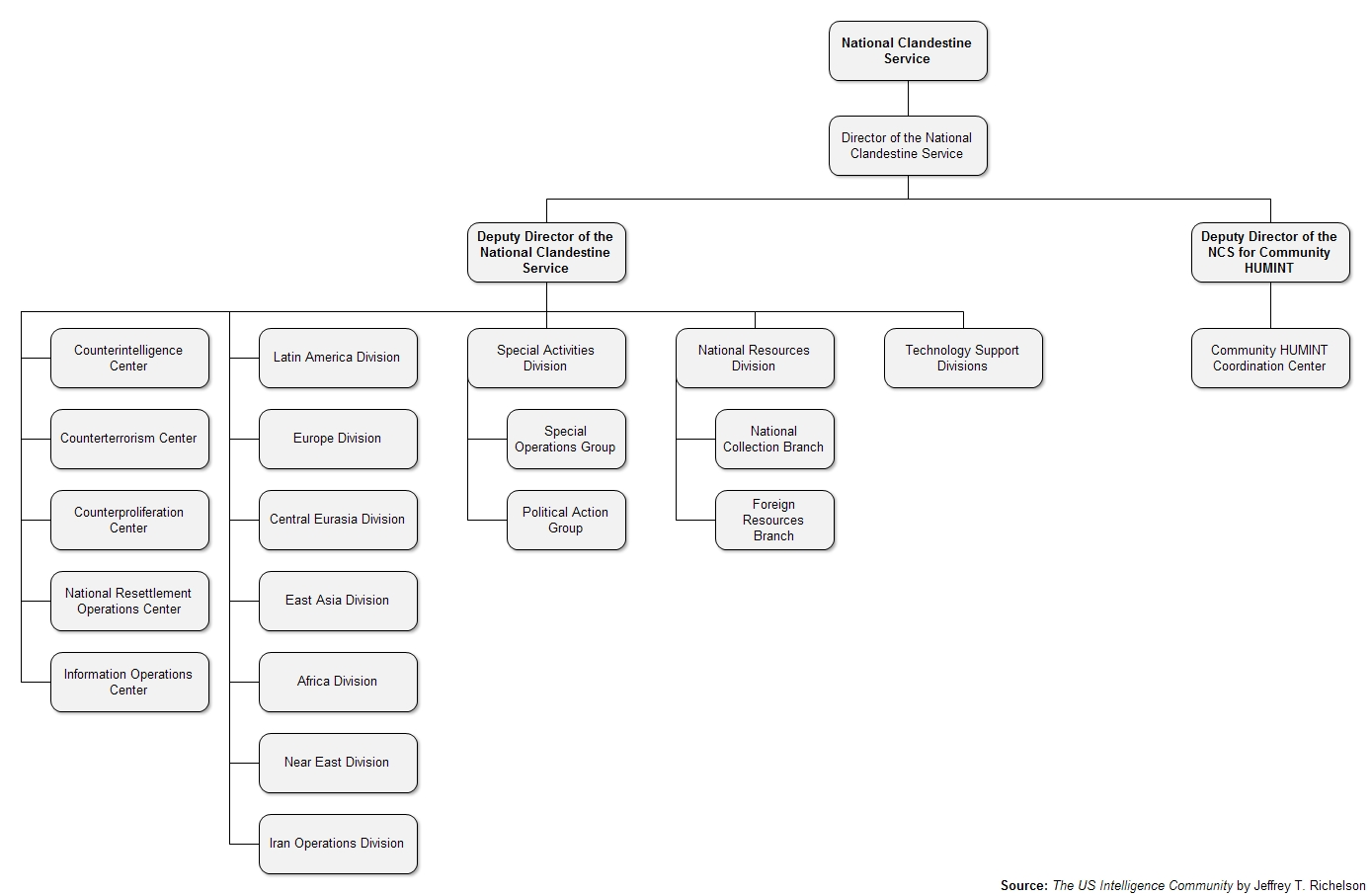
Organizational chart of the National Clandestine Service according to the book The US Intelligence Community by Jeffrey T. Richelson.

The DO is structured under its director as follows:

- Deputy Director for Operations
  - Counterproliferation Division
  - Mission Center for Counterterrorism
  - Counterintelligence Center
  - Regional & Transnational Issues Divisions
  - Technology Support Divisions
- Deputy Director of the NCS for Community HUMINT
  - Community HUMINT Coordination Center

A major headquarters element was the Counterintelligence Staff, most powerful when led by James Jesus Angleton. It was the principal U.S. organization responsible for vetting potential new Clandestine HUMINT assets, and for U.S. offensive counterespionage and deception.

Various groups provide support services, such as cover documentation and disguise. A technical services unit, sometimes in the clandestine division and occasionally in the Directorate of Science and Technology, contained both espionage equipment development and sometimes questionable research, such as the MKULTRA mind control program.

=== Special Activities Center ===
Under an assortment of names, such as the Special Activities Center (SAC), there is a paramilitary function that may enter and prepare an area of operations before U.S. special operation forces enter in a more overt military role. This may or may not include psychological operations, especially black propaganda; paramilitary and psychological functions have split and joined under various historical reorganizations.

Administrated by the DO, the paramilitary operations officers from the Special Operations Group are maintained in the Special Activities Center. They are highly skilled in weaponry; covert transport of personnel and material by air, sea, and land; guerrilla warfare; the use of explosives; assassination and sabotage; and escape and evasion techniques. They are prepared to respond quickly to a myriad of possible needs, from parachute drops and communications support to assistance with counter-narcotics operations and defector infiltration. SAC maintains a symbiotic relationship with the Joint Special Operations Command, and is largely run by former JSOC members.

SAC/SOG is a special operations force, along with the military's five special mission units:

- United States Naval Special Warfare Development Group (also known as DEVGRU, NSWDG or SEAL Team Six and previously Mob-Six)
- United States Army's 1st Special Forces Operational Detachment-Delta (also known as Delta Force, A.C.E. or C.A.G.)
- United States Army Intelligence Support Activity (also known as I.S.A., The Activity and previously Gray Fox)
- United States Army Regimental Reconnaissance Company
- United States Air Force's 24th Special Tactics Squadron

For special operations missions and its other responsibilities, the Special Operations staff attempts to recruit people with the requisite specialized skills, although geographic desks remain the principal units involved in the recruitment of personnel in so-called denied areas (such as Libya, Iran, Iraq, et cetera). Special operations also provide special air, ground, maritime and training support for the Agency's intelligence gathering operations.

== DO officers ==
The DO consists of four career categories of officers:

Below are brief descriptions of the four principal categories and where applicable the sub-categories of Clandestine Service Officers.

1. Case officers (CO): Formerly "operations officers," focus full-time on "clandestinely spotting, assessing, developing, recruiting, and handling individuals with access to vital foreign intelligence."
2. Collection management officers (CMO) "oversee and facilitate the collection, evaluation, classification, and dissemination of foreign intelligence developed from clandestine sources." They ensure that "foreign intelligence collected by clandestine sources is relevant, timely, and addresses the highest foreign policy and national security needs."
3. Staff operations officers (SOO) are based out of CIA headquarters in Washington, D.C., and "plan, guide and support intelligence collection operations, counterintelligence activities and covert action programs."
4. Specialized skills officers (SSO) consist of a diverse group of "information resource officers, language officers, paramilitary operations officers, programs and plans officers, and targeting officers—many of which are core collector certified." SSOs conduct and/or directly support CIA operations leveraging their language, media, technical skills and/or military experience. Qualified candidates can expect to focus on human intelligence operations and activities as defined by the intelligence community.

DO officers typically support global NCS intelligence gathering operations on threats to U.S. national security. Often working alongside and for U.S. policymakers abroad.

The NCS' primary action arm is the Special Activities Center, which conducts direct action-like raids, ambushes, sabotage, assassinations, unconventional warfare (e.g. training and leading guerrillas), and deniable psychological operations, the latter also known as "covert influence". While special reconnaissance may be either a military or intelligence operation, these usually are executed by SAD officers in denied areas. Paramilitary Operations Officers are chosen mainly from the ranks of U.S. special operations forces. SAD operatives are the most specialized because they combine the best special operations and clandestine intelligence capabilities in one individual. They operate in any environment (sea, air, or ground), with limited to no support. They originate in the SAD's Special Operations Group (SOG), considered one of the most elite special operations units in the world.

Program and Plans Officers devise, oversee and carry out many long-term clandestine operational activities primarily of a non-paramilitary nature, but often in support of paramilitary programs. These activities vary greatly by difficulty and purpose. Language Officers function within the NCS, applying advanced foreign language skills, experience, and expertise to provide translation, interpretation, and language-related support for a variety of NCS clandestine operations.

== Covert action ==
A covert action is defined as "an activity or activities of the United States government to influence political, economic, or military conditions abroad, where it is intended that the role of the United States Government will not be apparent or acknowledged publicly". A covert operation differs from a clandestine operation in that emphasis is placed on concealment of the identity of the sponsor rather than on concealment of the operation.

Covert operations include paramilitary and psychological activities. See Psychological Operations (United States) for a more general discussion of U.S. psychological operations, including those operations for which the CIA is responsible and those that belong to other agencies.

Executive Order 12333 bans assassinations by persons employed by or acting on behalf of the United States government.

== Clandestine HUMINT collection ==
Legal authorities

A number of statutes, executive orders, and directives assign the task of conducting HUMINT operations to the CIA:

1. By federal statute, the CIA's director is tasked with the collection of intelligence through human sources and by other appropriate means.
2. Executive Order 12333 states, "The Director of the Central Intelligence Agency shall coordinate the clandestine collection of foreign intelligence collected through human sources such as 'moles' or other human-enabled means and counterintelligence activities outside the United States."
3. National Security Council Intelligence Directive No. 5 (NSCID 5) provides that: "The Director of Central Intelligence shall conduct all organized Federal espionage operations outside the United States and its possessions for the collection of foreign intelligence information required to meet the needs of all Departments and Agencies concerned, in connection with the national security, except for certain agreed activities by other Departments and Agencies."
4. Intelligence Community Directive Number 340 designates the CIA as the National HUMINT Manager.

Tradecraft

Techniques for the clandestine collection of HUMINT are collectively known as tradecraft. A discussion of many of these techniques can be found at Clandestine HUMINT operational techniques.

Very few statutes and publicly available regulations deal specifically with clandestine HUMINT techniques. One such statute forbids the use of journalists as agents unless the president makes the written determination to waive this restriction based on the "overriding national security interest of the United States". In the Intelligence Authorization Act for the Fiscal Year 2002, Congress instructed the CIA's director to rescind what Congress viewed as overly restrictive guidelines regarding the recruitment of foreign assets who had a record of human rights violations.

Camp Peary (also referred to as "The Farm"), near Williamsburg, Virginia, is purportedly a CIA training facility for clandestine operatives.

== Clandestine technical collection ==
The Agency also may be responsible for developing communications systems appropriate for clandestine operations. In 1962, the Central Intelligence Agency, Deputy Directorate for Research (now the Deputy Directorate for Science and Technology), formally took on ELINT and COMINT responsibilities.

The consolidation of the ELINT program was one of the major goals of the reorganization ... it is responsible for:

- ELINT support peculiar to the penetration problems associated with the Agent's reconnaissance program under NRO.
- Maintain a quick reaction capability for ELINT and COMINT equipment.

CIA's Office of Research and Development was formed to stimulate research and innovation testing leading to the exploitation of non-agent intelligence collection methods. ... All non-agent technical collection systems will be considered by this office and those appropriate for field deployment will be so deployed. The Agency's missile detection system, Project [deleted] based on backscatter radar is an example. This office will also provide integrated systems analysis of all possible collection methods against the Soviet antiballistic missile program is an example.

Sometimes in cooperation with technical personnel at other agencies such as the NSA when the collection discipline is SIGINT, or the DIA when the techniques come MASINT, or other appropriate agencies such as the Department of Energy for nuclear information, the CIA may work to place technical collection equipment in denied territory. They have also cooperated in placing such equipment into U.S. embassies. Emplacing and servicing such equipment is another form of clandestine operation, of which the adversary should not be aware. These include:

- Research, development, testing, and production of ELINT and COMINT collection equipment for all Agency operations.
- Technical operation and maintenance of CIA deployed non-agent ELINT systems.
- Training and maintenance of agent ELINT equipment
- Technical support to the Third Party Agreements.
- Data reduction of Agency-collected ELINT signals.

See MASINT from clandestinely placed sensors. The CIA took on a more distinct MASINT responsibility in 1987. The National Security Archive commented, "In 1987, Deputy Director for Science and Technology Evan Hineman established ... a new Office for Special Projects. concerned not with satellites, but with emplaced sensors – sensors that could be placed in a fixed location to collect signals intelligence or measurement and signature intelligence (MASINT) about a specific target. Such sensors had been used to monitor Chinese missile tests, Soviet laser activity, military movements, and foreign nuclear programs. The office was established to bring together scientists from the DS&T’s Office of SIGINT Operations, who designed such systems, with operators from the Directorate of Operations, who were responsible for transporting the devices to their clandestine locations and installing them."

== Overt HUMINT ==
In addition they may produce HUMINT from overt sources, such as voluntary interviews with travelers, businesspeople, etc. Some of the latter may be considered open source intelligence OSINT and be performed by other agencies, just as reports from diplomats are another form of HUMINT that flows into the State Department.

At times, this function may be assigned to the CIA, because its counter-intelligence staff has biographical indexes that let them check the background of foreign citizens offering information. For example, there may be a name check on a business or scientific contact who meets either with CIA representatives or staff of the Open Source Enterprise.

== Controversy ==
The Directorate has been subject to harsh criticism in the media, and due to its covert and independent nature did not, or could not, effectively respond. Its capabilities had been in decline since the public outcry resulting from the Church Committee's revelations of the DO's highly questionable activities. Furthermore, the DO fought frequent power shifting "turf" battles amongst the executive branch bureaucracies, most prominently with the Federal Bureau of Investigation and the Defense and State departments. These factors became key reasons for the NCS's inception.

Former NCS director Jose Rodriguez was criticized for his role in the 2005 CIA interrogation tapes destruction.

== See also ==
- Defense Clandestine Service
- Office of Strategic Services
  - X-2 Counterintelligence Branch
- Special Collection Service
