= Station chief =

Government official

A station chief is a government official who is the head of a team, post, or function usually in a foreign country. Historically, it commonly referred to the head of a defensible structure such as an ambassador's residence or colonial outpost. In Germany, a Stationsleiter (station leader) was the government's chief representative in a colonial possession like South Sea Islands. It may also be used to refer to the manager of remote scientific stations such as those in the Antarctic and Jarvis Island, an uninhabited minor U.S. Pacific island.

However, in modern times, this designation is usually used for a senior official of a certain country's intelligence agency, stationed in a foreign country, who manages all espionage operations in that country. The Russian title for this post is Rezident.

== CIA ==
The station chief, also called chief of station, is the top U.S. Central Intelligence Agency official stationed in a foreign country who manages all CIA operations in that country, equivalent to a KGB rezident. The station chief is often a senior U.S. intelligence officer who represents the Office of the Director of National Intelligence (ODNI) in his or her respective foreign government, whose name may ("declared status") or may not ("undeclared status") be officially revealed to the host nation and other intelligence agencies. Former officers are not usually allowed to include their positions as station chiefs in their résumés even after their covers have been lifted.

Other CIA offices in foreign countries, usually performing logistics and other support functions and subordinate to the station, are known as bases and are headed by chiefs of base.

== See also ==
- List of CIA station chiefs
- Opperhoofd
