= Darrell Blocker =

American former intelligence officer

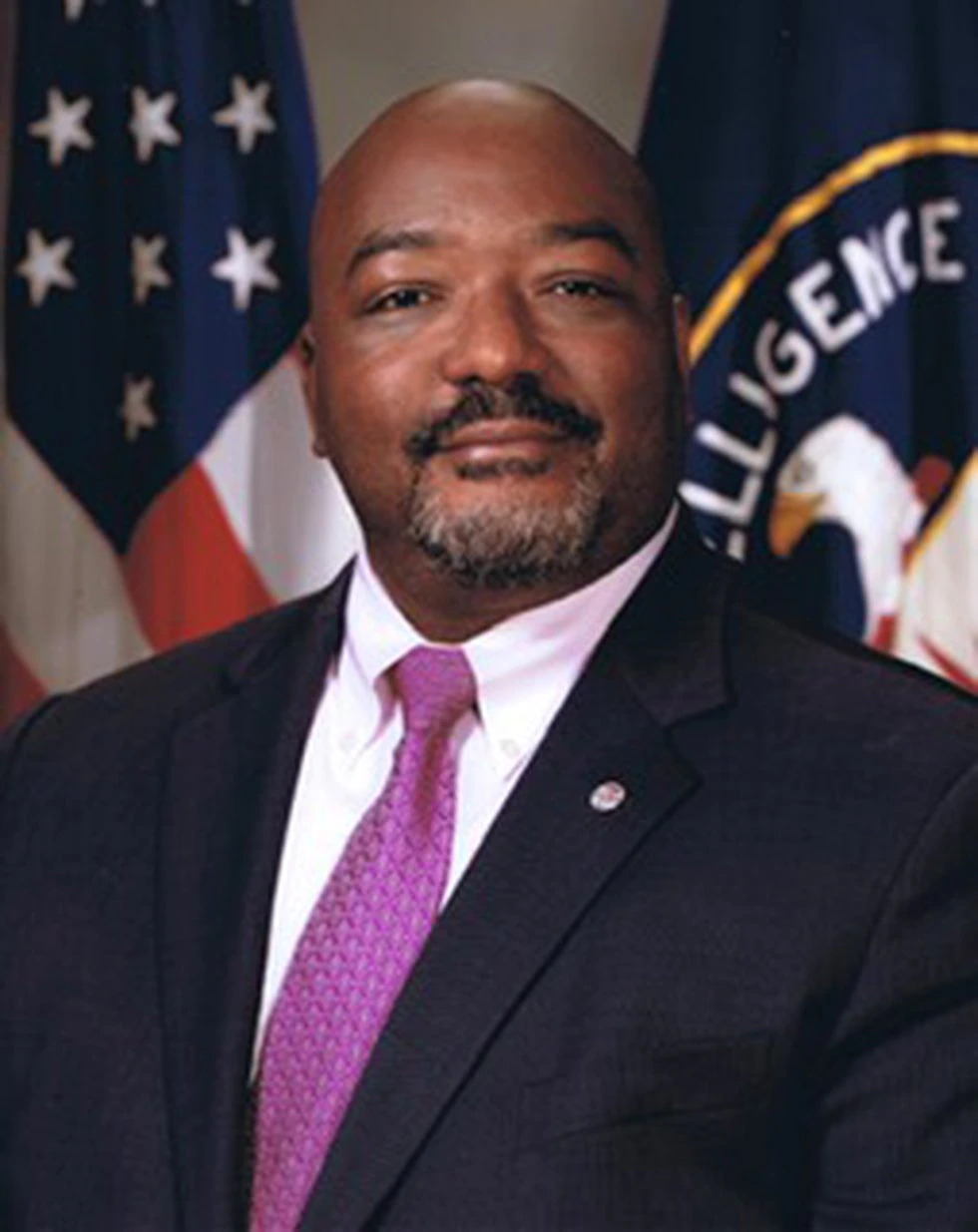

Central Intelligence Agency Counterterrorism Center

Deputy Director
- President: George W. Bush

Personal details
- Children: 2
- Education: University of Georgia (BA)
- Occupation: Intelligence officer
- Awards: Distinguished Career Intelligence Medal
- Nickname: "The Spy Whisperer"

Military service
- Allegiance: United States
- Branch: United States Air Force
- Years of service: 1987–1990
- Rank: Captain

Darrell M. Blocker is a former American intelligence officer who served for 28 years with the Central Intelligence Agency. He held prominent positions including deputy director of the Counterterrorism Center (CTC), Chief of Africa Division, and Chief of Training at Camp Peary, Virginia, better known as "The Farm". Within the intelligence community, Blocker was known for participating in a number of semi-professional musical ensembles during his postings abroad. He retired in 2018 as the most senior black officer in the CIA's Directorate of Operations. Since 2019 Blocker has been chief operating officer of intelligence and advisory firm MOSAIC, and a contributor for ABC News.

In November 2020, Fox News reported that president-elect Joe Biden had included Blocker among his shortlist of candidates to nominate for Director of the Central Intelligence Agency; in the end, the position went to William J. Burns.

== Early life ==
Blocker grew up in Hephzibah, Georgia, in an Air Force family. While growing up he also lived in Japan, Italy, Texas, and Augusta, Georgia.

In Augusta he attended Windsor Spring Elementary, Glenn Hills Junior High School, and Butler High School. He then attended the University of Georgia, where he sang in a church choir and was part of the glee club, in addition to serving in Air Force ROTC. He graduated in 1984 with a degree in psychology.

== Intelligence career ==
Blocker began his career as an intelligence analyst for the United States Air Force. He served for four years, from 1987 to 1990, before separating honorably.

He then joined the Central Intelligence Agency's (CIA) Directorate of Operations, formally known as the Clandestine Service, around 1990. Blocker wrote his CIA entrance essay about the First Palestinian Intifada, and concluded that: "every nation in history that has fought and won actual territory, actual ground, them giving it back — it just hasn’t happened."

Blocker was a CIA operations officer, Chief of Station, deputy director of Counterterrorism Center (CTC) under Michael D'Andrea, and later Chief of Africa Division. Subsequently, he went on to lead the CIA training division at Camp Peary, Virginia, better known as "The Farm". Throughout his 28-year career, Blocker served in 10 countries, among them Senegal, Burundi, Uganda (undercover; beginning in 2003), Niger, Nigeria, Somalia, Morocco, and Pakistan. He said: "I’ve had 27 addresses in my 56 years -- 22 of those as an adult." He recruited and developed undercover sources and spies who would provide intelligence about potential threats and targets in his area of responsibility. He began playing music as part of his espionage duties in Senegal in 1996. While undercover in Uganda, Blocker became a minor celebrity as lead singer in a popular local band in the capital city of Kampala, known as the "Kampala Jazz All-Stars".

He began learning about Judaism while he was in college, and began wearing a chai as a pendant. In 2017 he converted to Judaism. He identifies as a conservative Jew.

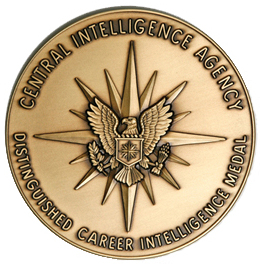
Distinguished Career Intelligence Medal of the CIA

Blocker retired from the CIA in 2018, as the most senior black officer in its Directorate of Operations. He had a rank equivalent to a 3-star general. Upon retirement, he was awarded the CIA's Distinguished Career Intelligence Medal.

== Later career ==
In 2019 Blocker became the chief operating officer of the multinational security firm MOSAIC (Multi Operational Security Agency Intelligence Company). In August 2019 Blocker joined ABC News as a contributor, appearing on Good Morning America and This Week as a subject matter expert on Africa, Iran, North Korea and Terrorism. He now lives in Santa Monica, California.

He also consults on projects in the entertainment industry, including for MGM and Skydance on season 2 of CONDOR, a television adaptation of Six Days of the Condor by James Grady, which features a young CIA analyst as the primary protagonist.

Blocker also serves on the board of nonprofits Peace4Kids and HumanSlavery.com, organizations dedicated to improving the future of youth in foster care, and ending human trafficking and exploitation, respectively.

In November 2020, Fox News reported that Blocker was among President-elect Joe Biden's shortlist for Director of the CIA. Axios reported that insiders viewed him as a front-runner; but reporter Spencer Ackerman characterized Blocker as "a long shot". In the end, the Biden nominated William J. Burns.
