= Persian Relief Committee =

American organization established in Iran in 1916

The Persian Relief Committee, established in 1916, was the name of an American organization in Iran that was formed to help the people affected by World War I and its aftermath. The organization was established in Iran under the leadership of a missionary named John Lawrence Caldwell. A committee called the "American Persian Relief Commission" was formed in New York City, chaired by Dr. Harry Pratt Judson, president of the University of Chicago, to fund the organization and support those who worked for it. According to a report, amount of $2,271,570, as well as some grain for planting and trucks to transport food from India to Iran, has been donated by the Persian Relief Committee.

It is said that during World War I, the United States Department of State also forced the International Committee of the Red Cross to provide significant assistance to Iran.

== See also ==
- Mary Wade Griscom
- Mahmoud Ahmadinejad's letter to George W. Bush
- Deportation of the Iranian students at US airports
- Correspondence between Barack Obama and Ali Khamenei
- Negotiations leading to the Joint Comprehensive Plan of Action
- United States withdrawal from the Joint Comprehensive Plan of Action
