= Academic relations between Iran and the United States =

Iran-US Academic Relations

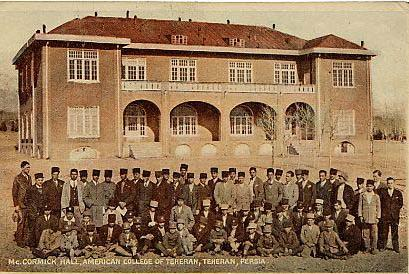
American College of Tehran was an institution of higher education that was certified by State University of New York in 1930.

Academic relations between Iran and the United States involve a branch of cultural relations between the two countries that became widespread, especially during the Pahlavi era.

Higher education in Iran during the modern era generally begins with the establishment of the academy of Dar al-Fonun. However, there have already been a number of activities to establish higher education institutions in Iran, in which the Americans have played a major role.

== Early figures ==
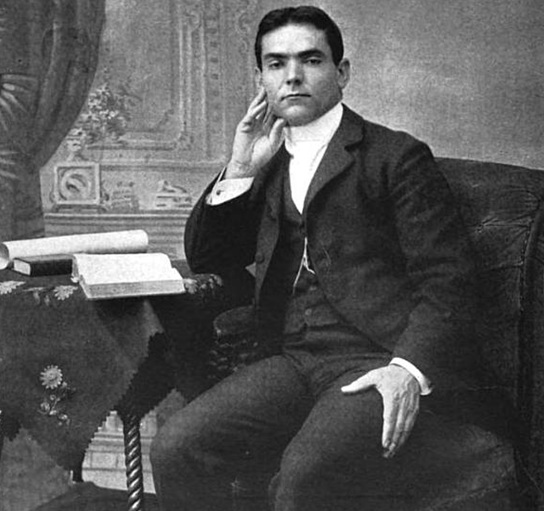
"Hakim Eshaq Adams", one of the first Iranian students in the United States.

Yokhanan Sayaad Abaajlou, a graduate of Dr. Joseph Cochran at Urmia University of Medical Sciences, went to New York City in 1887 for postgraduate studies, making him the first Iranian student to go to the United States for higher medical education.

Other Iranians who went to the United States for the first time to study include the following:

- Hakim David Yokhna (born in Urmia), who left Iran for the United States in 1895 to obtain a doctorate in medicine from Case Western Reserve University.
- Hakim Yaqob Sarkis, who went to Ohio in 1893 to study medicine.
- Elisha Sayaad Abaajlou, also went to Rush Medical College in Chicago for postgraduate studies, then returned to Iran in 1904 after graduating.
- Hakim Polos Malek, son of Shamas Babu Malek Mellatbashi, returned to Iran from Philadelphia in 1914 after graduating.
- Eshaq Adams, who immigrated to the United States in 1891, received his medical degree from Grand Rapids Medical College in Michigan, USA. The book Persia by a Persian, published by Elliot Stock, London, 1906 was written by him. He died in 1942 in California.
- Yoel Yoseph Ahl Baz, who graduated from College of Wooster in Ohio, USA in 1905. His daughter wrote the book Yesterday's Children: Growing Up Assyrian in Persia, which was published in the United States.

=== Memorial School of Tabriz ===
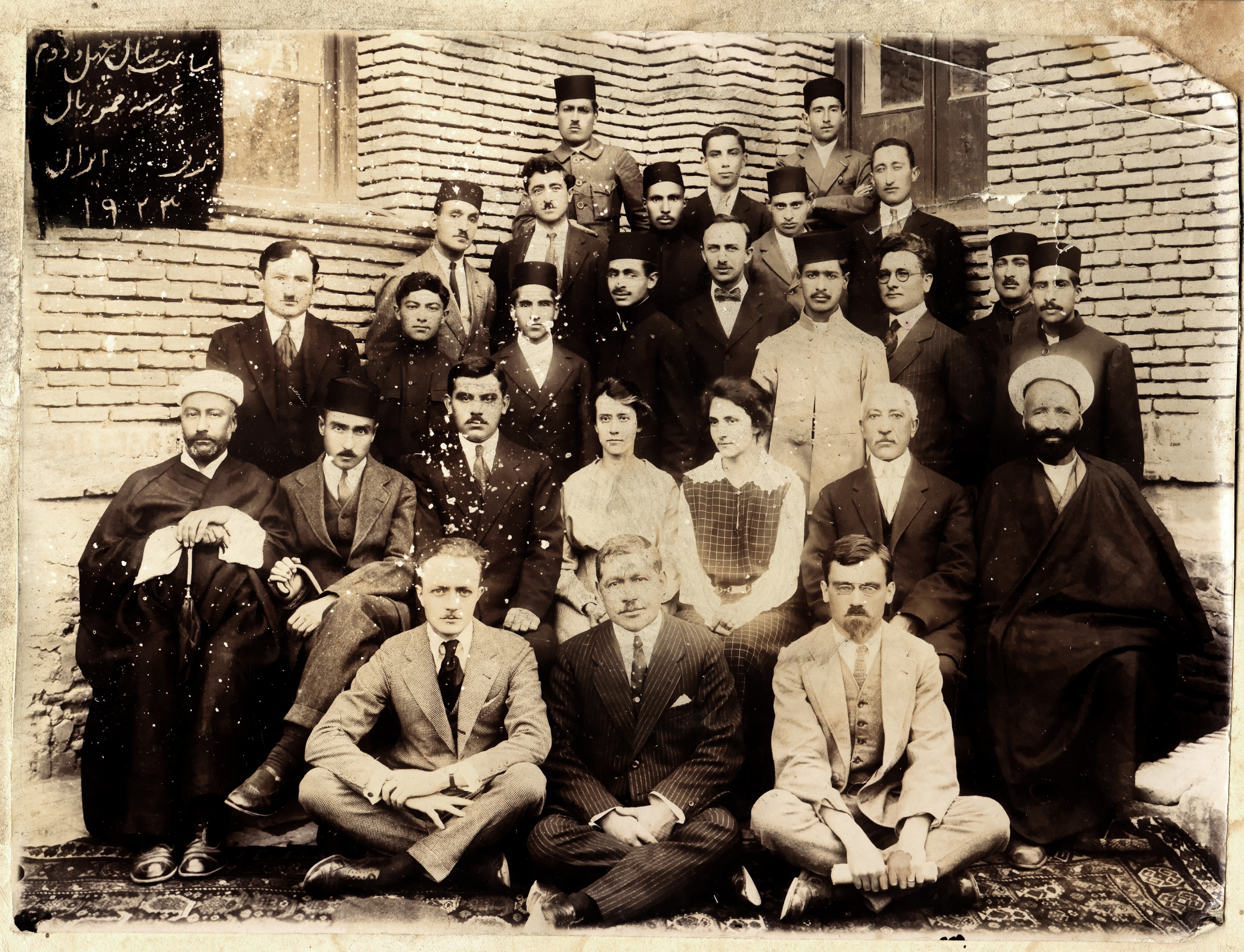
A photo of the teachers of the Memorial School in 1923 on the occasion of the forty-second anniversary of the establishment of this educational institution in Tabriz.

The Memorial School was founded in 1881 and was run by religious missionaries of the American Presbyterian sect. This school was one of the institutions founded by American expeditions that had served in the city of Tabriz since the mid-nineteenth century. Eighty Muslims and 135 Armenian and Assyrian Christians were enrolled in the school.

In the early years of its existence, the Memorial School did not matter. The students there were exclusively Iranian Armenians. Number of them were also limited, but later the school gained importance, and a group of Muslim students also began to study there. After the Constitutionalism and the cultural movement, the Memorial School has become more important.

Kasravi writes: "Before the constitutional movement and also in the early years of that movement, the American School in Tabriz (Memorial School) was valued by libertarians because it was the only place where English and European science were taught and many wise young people came there. At this time, a story was created about the solidarity between that school and the constitutional movement, and that was the joining of Mr. Baskerville, one of the teachers there, to the Tabriz revolutionaries and his killing in the way of the Iranian constitution."

Vartan Gregorian is one of the graduates of this school who immigrated to the United States to continue his education and after studying in the United States, he taught and researched and became the president of Brown University, the president of New York Public Library and finally the president of Carnegie Corporation of New York.

=== Alborz School and American Girls' School in Tehran ===
It was in 1932 that the Alborz High School and the American Girls' School in Tehran were officially chartered by State University of New York. One of those who worked hard for the development of these American pre-university institutes was Dr. Samuel M. Jordan, an American who some has been called him the "father of modern Iranian education." Jordan Street in Tehran was also named in honor of him.

=== Urmia University of Medical Sciences ===
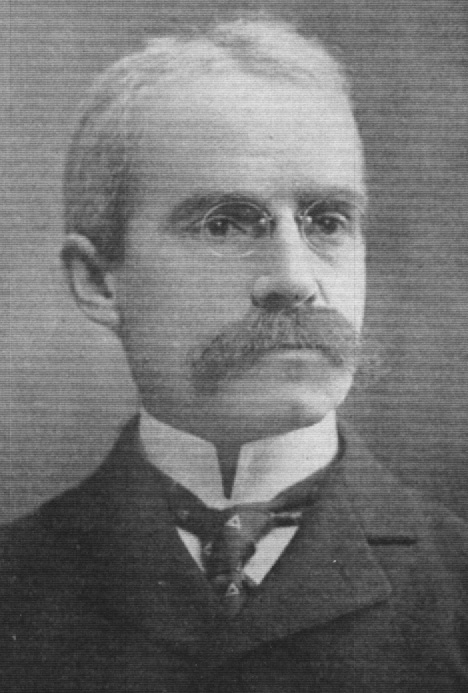
Dr. Joseph Cochran, founder of the first modern medical institute in Iran.

In medical sciences, while the "Maderseye Tebb" and the Dar al-Fonun in Tehran are often considered the first institutions of higher medical education in Iran, modern medical education in Iran was actually established in 1878 in Urmia. Founded by the American Dr. Joseph Cochran, the institute delivered a total of 26 graduates between 1878 and 1909. Mozaffar ad-Din Shah Qajar himself signed the graduation certificates of some graduates.

Dr. Cochran and almost all of the American faculty (including Dr. Wright, Dr. Homles, Dr. Van Norden, and Dr. Miller) were all buried in Urmia, and the institute eventually became Urmia University of Medical Sciences.

== Academic relations ==
In 1976, at the end of the Pahlavi era, Iran had the largest number of foreign students in American universities among the world, with 20,000 students. On the other hand, at least 59 American universities were involved in the development or establishment of higher education in Iran. For example, the following can be mentioned:

Iranian university	Guide or template university
Shiraz University and Shiraz University of Medical Sciences	Kent State University and University of Pennsylvania
Isfahan University of Technology	University of Illinois Chicago and Massachusetts Institute of Technology
Sharif University of Technology	Massachusetts Institute of Technology
University of Tehran and Tehran University of Medical Sciences	Johns Hopkins University and Indiana University and University of Utah and University of Illinois Urbana-Champaign and University of Colorado Boulder and University of Alabama and University of Southern California and University of Virginia and Colorado State University
University of Mazandaran	Harvard University
Imam Sadiq University	Harvard University
Ferdowsi University of Mashhad	Georgetown University
American College of Tehran	State University of New York
Kharazmi University	University of California, Los Angeles
Urmia University and Urmia University of Medical Sciences	A group of physicians from New York Medical College

== Shiraz University and Ivy League ==
After World War II, Mohammad Reza Pahlavi gradually decided to change the model of Iranian higher education institutions from the French university system to the American system. That's why the Pahlavi government tried to get American universities to cooperate in the late 1950s. In the meantime, following the invitation of Mohammad Reza Pahlavi from president of the University of Pennsylvania to Iran, after several negotiations, Shiraz University came under the supervision and assistance of the renowned Ivy League University, so that scientific and cultural relations between these two universities became the strongest scientific and cultural relations between Iran and America and continued until the last days of the Mohammad Reza Pahlavi's rule. The development of many courses, the design and development of university campuses, the training of professors, and the founding of many research institutes at Shiraz University (then known as Pahlavi University) were all made by the Ivy League University.

In the design of the Pardis Of Eram campus, an American Minoru Yamasaki, was the designer and architect of the student dormitory buildings on the Eram hill. This project coincided with the Iranian Revolution of 1979 and remained unfinished.

== Development of Tehran University ==
In the late 1940s, the teaching and research structure of the University of Tehran gradually began to emulate the American university system. The faculty of agriculture of this university, for example, was developed with the help of the University of Utah.

In 1954, the Institute of Administrative Sciences of the University of Tehran (now the faculty of management) began offering doctoral degrees with the help of the University of Southern California, headed by "Dr. Harry Marlow".

In 1958, the Journalism Institute of the University of Tehran was established with the help of the University of Virginia and "Dr. James Wallard".

And Johns Hopkins University which in 1965 established a doctorate in cytopathology at the University of Tehran.

== Sharif University of Technology and MIT ==
Another prominent example of close academic and cultural ties between Iran and the United States was the "Aria Mehr University of Technology" in Tehran (now Sharif University of Technology), which was modeled directly on MIT in the United States.

Seyyed Hossein Nasr, the president of "Aria Mehr University of Technology", was an MIT graduate.

== Americans and Isfahan University of Technology ==
The main and original designers of "Aria Mehr University of Technology of Isfahan" (now Isfahan University of Technology) both in terms of academic structure and organizational foundation were:

- American company "Arthur D. Little" (an academic consulting firm)
- "Dr. Gordon Brown", Dean of all engineering faculty and one of the main executives of MIT
- "Dr. George Bugliarello", Dean of the Faculty of Engineering, University of Illinois Chicago
- "Dr. Mehdi Zarghamee", Vice Chancellor of "Aria Mehr University of Technology" in Tehran

It was "Dr. Brown" who established the first six faculties of Isfahan University of Technology. In his final report, about the comprehensive plan of "Aria Mehr University of Technology" in Isfahan is mentioned:

"The main purpose of this educational institute is to avoid the current and classic university structure, and instead, to organize and focus the academic activities of this university on the important technological issues of Iran. The reality of today's needs for Iran's rapid development requires that the country's education system not be merely a copy of Western educational institutions. Instead of following the example of Western systems and the twenty-year-old models that have become obsolete in the West, the Iranian educational system should be based on Iranian culture and the characteristics of Iranian society."

== Academy of Gondishapur of Ahvaz ==
In 1979, the scientific-cultural relationship between Iran and the United States at Academy of Gondishapur in Ahvaz was so extensive that at least 30 American professors taught at this academy.

== Iran University of Medical Sciences ==
The Iran University of Medical Sciences became one of the most important medical information centers internationally through direct satellite communication with the American Medical Information Center. The university was then designated by the World Health Organization as the library and information center of the vast Eastern Mediterranean region. In 1976, with the cooperation of Harvard University, Columbia University and Cornell University together, educational planning and development activities, determination of spaces, provision of necessary equipment and manpower for Iran University of Medical Sciences were carried out. The original buildings of this university were designed and built by William Pereira, an American architect.

== Universities of Utah and Agricultural Development of Iran ==
Many Iranian government officials are graduates of Utah higher education institutions.

In 1950, the United States, in line with Harry S. Truman's policy and the Point Four Program, established a plan called "USAID". From there, Utah State University worked to make agricultural technology more affordable for developing countries such as Iran between 1951 and 1954, and the program continued into the 1960s.

The University of Utah also established extensive relationships, especially with the University of Tehran, to exchange students and researchers, which lasted for years.

Many graduates came from these relationships, including Ardeshir Zahedi and Ali Asghar Soltanieh.

However, the University of Utah and Utah State University had established scientific and cultural relations and exchanges with Iran for many years (due to the climatic similarity between Iran and Utah). The first Iranian student to travel to Utah to study dates back to 1912. And in 1939, Reza Shah Pahlavi asked the United States to send agricultural specialists to Iran. Franklin S. Harris, a professor and president of Brigham Young University, came to Iran in response to Reza Shah's request.

== University of Chicago and Persian Relief Committee ==
In addition to The Oriental Institute of the University of Chicago's relationship with Iran during World War I, a committee called the "American Persian Relief Commission" was formed in New York City to finance and support those who worked for the Persian Relief Committee. The committee chaired by Dr. Harry Pratt Judson, president of the University of Chicago.

According to a report, amount of $2,271,570, as well as some grain for planting and trucks to transport food from India to Iran, has been donated by the "Persian Relief Committee".

== Other relations ==
Mohammad Khatami delivered a lecture at Seton Hall University in 2001. Mohammad Javad Zarif also delivered several lectures at US universities, including Princeton University in 2006.

On the other hand, University of Texas MD Anderson Cancer Center had contacts with Iranian universities, such as Tehran University of Medical Sciences, through the American Association for the Advancement of Science. In the same year, delegates exchanged between Jackson State University and Shiraz University of Medical Sciences to find ways to provide low-cost medical care to rural Mississippi.

== Obstacles ==
Despite the desire of both sides to improve and develop scientific and cultural relations, obstacles (such as sanctions against Iran) remain in the way of these goals. For example, in December 2008, "Glenn Schweitzer", director of the American Association for the Advancement of Science in Europe and Asia (who has worked hard to exchange professors between Iran and the United States), twice in Tehran for nine hours in his hotel room, he was arrested and interrogated by plainclothes security agents, which was strongly protested by the American Association for the Advancement of Science. The detention of some Sharif University of Technology professors in the United States has also been protested by the university professors. On the other hand, an Iranian professor who had been invited by the BBC to a debate at the American University of Beirut was removed from the debate by the university, which strongly objected to by him.

== See also ==
- Iran–United States relations
- Embassy of the United States of America in Tabriz
- Mahmoud Ahmadinejad's letter to George W. Bush
- Deportation of the Iranian students at US airports
- Correspondence between Barack Obama and Ali Khamenei
- Phone conversation between Barack Obama and Hassan Rouhani
- United States Cultural Diplomacy in Iran
