= Griscom (name) =

Notable people with the surname Griscom include:

- Betsy Ross, probably apocryphal designer of the American flag, born Elizabeth Phoebe Griscom
- Clement Griscom, American shipping magnate, father of Frances C. Griscom
- Deborah Griscom Passmore, American botanical illustrator
- Frances C. Griscom, American amateur golfer, daughter of Clement Griscom
- John Griscom, American educator
- Ludlow Griscom, American ornithologist
- Lloyd Carpenter Griscom, American diplomat
- Mary Wade Griscom, American physician and medical school professor
- Nina Griscom, American model, television host, designer, columnist, and businesswoman
- Tom Griscom, American newspaper editor
- William Woodnut Griscom, American electrical engineer and founder of the Electro-Dynamic Company
