= Robert Grenier =

Robert Greniermay refer to:

- Robert Grenier (poet) (born 1941), American poet
- Robert Grenier (CIA officer), American former Central Intelligence Agency officer
