= Phone conversation between Barack Obama and Hassan Rouhani =

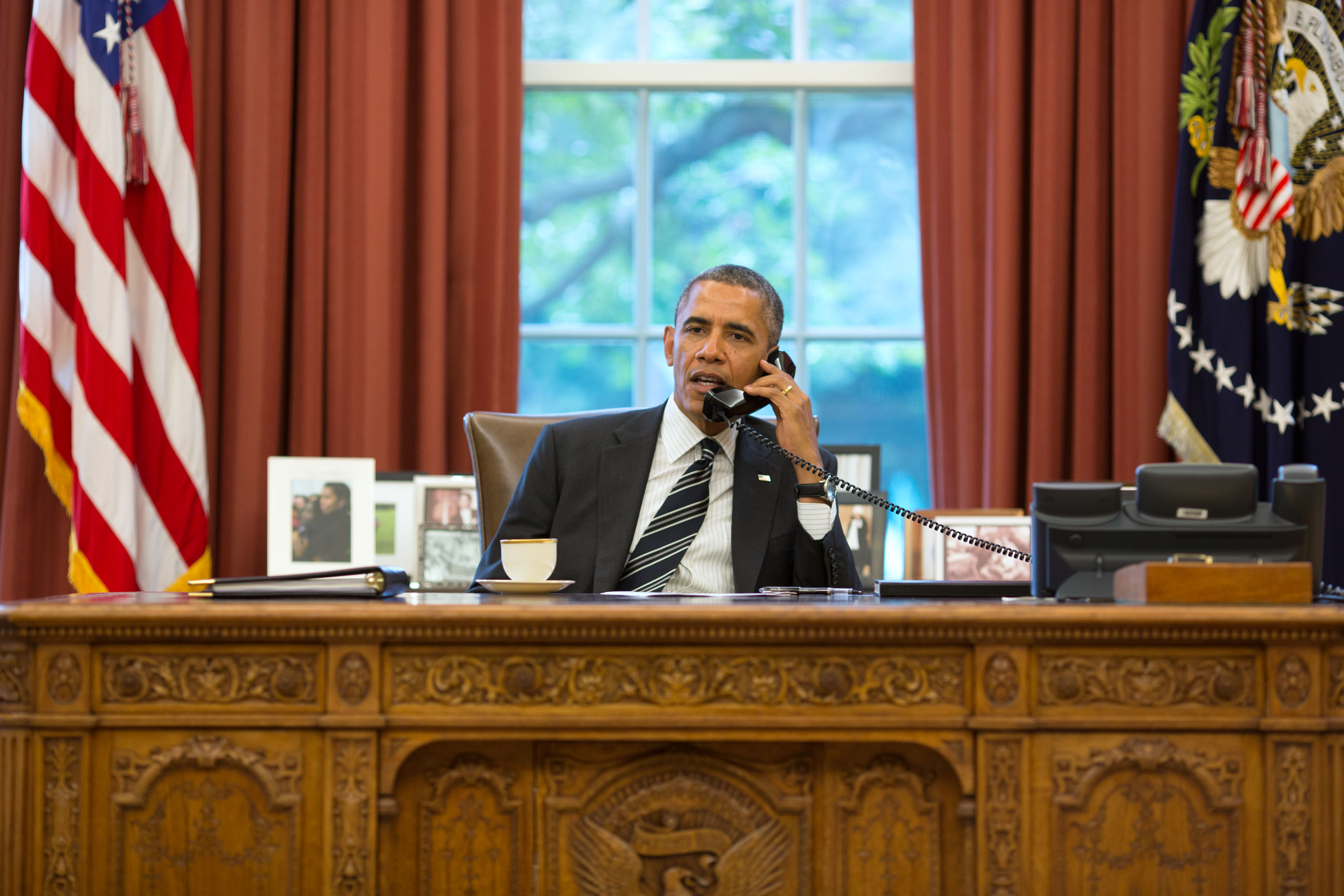
Barack Obama on the telephone with Hassan Rouhani

The phone conversation between Barack Obama and Hassan Rouhani took place on September 27, 2013 during Rouhani's trip to New York. The 15-minute telephone conversation was the first communication between the two countries since ties were severed in 1979. Hundreds of international news agencies and newspapers headlined their news coverage by telephone calls from Barack Obama and Hassan Rouhani.

== Event ==
In the final hours of Friday, September 27, 2013, while Hassan Rouhani and the Iranian delegation participating in the 68th General Assembly of the United Nations were about to return to Iran from John F. Kennedy Airport, Hassan Rouhani for the first time in history of the Islamic Republic of Iran spoke directly to US President Barack Obama by telephone while sitting in a limousine heading to the airport, The phone call mostly emphasizing the political will of the two sides to resolve the Iranian nuclear issue quickly and setting the stage for resolving other issues and cooperating on regional issues. The news of this phone call quickly became the first news of the international media and it was referred to as a historical event. In the conversation, Rouhani ended the call by saying, "Have a Nice Day!" and Obama responded by saying "Thank you. Khodahafez (goodbye)." This phone call, because it was the first telephone conversation of the President of Iran with the President of the United States and was considered as the first verbal contact of senior officials of the Islamic Republic of Iran with senior US officials, was strongly reflected in the media inside and outside Iran.

== U.S. initiative ==
The Tehran Today newspaper wrote that Rouhani considered the talks to be held at the request of the American side. The American side also said that it had requested a dialogue with Iran. Rouhani stated:

The American officials insisted and sought for a meeting between the two presidents, and before I left Iran, a few days before the trip, they sent the first message, which was on Friday, my trip would be on Monday. Their next message was also sent on the same Friday, and they sent a total of 5 messages on Saturday and Sunday, and we did not respond to these messages, and I told my friends at the Foreign Ministry that I would make a decision when I arrived in New York, and it was discussed, and in the end, this meeting did not take place because there was no opportunity to agree on the details regarding all dimensions and angles. The discussion was that, for example, a short meeting of a few minutes between me and the President of the United States should take place in the corridors of the General Assembly or one of the meetings that we are participating in. (...) There was some promises between our Minister of Foreign Affairs and the United States' Secretary of State about that on Friday (...) that Mr. Obama would call and have a brief phone conversation with us, which finally happened at the moment of departure, as they called our Ambassador's cell phone.

== Rouhani and Obama's remarks ==
Regarding the issues raised in the telephone conversation, Rouhani said that the discussion he had with Obama was mainly the nuclear issue. He said that "this issue is not only the right of the Iranian people but also a part of the national pride of the Iranian". He continued: Regarding the P5 + 1, he said that "with the opportunity created by the Iranian nation, this opportunity should be used and expedited in this matter", so the President of the United States said "I instruct the Secretary of State to expedite this matter;" Their main focus was to move faster on the nuclear issue. After the call, Barack Obama said on a television program: "Just now, I spoke on the phone with President Rouhani. Our conversation was about the current actions and efforts to reach an agreement on Iran's nuclear program."

Rouhani said that in this regard:

I spoke with Mr. Obama on the phone, and this relationship between the two nations can be the beginning of a long way ahead. Of course, not all our problems with the West can be solved by a phone call or a meeting. From the very first letter that Mr. Obama wrote to me after the presidential election and congratulated me on the election, and other issues that he raised in the letter, and according to this phone call, it is quite clear that the viewpoint has changed. Obama told me on the phone that we have a lot of problems inside and you have a lot of problems inside Iran, so we have to think about how to overcome these problems.

Rouhani stressed that Obama also said on the phone that they both emphasized in his speech that he is not looking for nuclear weapons and that the supreme leader of Iran also said that the production of weapons is forbidden by Islamic law (fatwa), so the way is open to achieve results, but both nations should know that foreign policy issues are not a smooth path ahead. Rather, they have a difficult road ahead of them, and the problems of eight or ten years cannot be solved in ten days. Rouhani said about this phone call:

In my opinion, on the issue of Iran and the United States, we have a lot of problems, and I told Mr. Obama on this phone that there has been a very dark atmosphere between Iran and the United States for the past 35 years, and our nation were opposed to US actions on various occasions. It is not a problem that can be solved in the short term, and he replied that I also said that it can not be solved on one night and we need time.

== Iran's internal reactions ==
=== Affirmative ===
- After Hassan Rouhani returned to Iran when he was in Mehrabad airport, some of his supporters demonstrated and chanted affirmative slogans. He was also greeted by some government officials at Mehrabad Airport. A group that went to greet Mr. Rouhani also sacrificed lamb for him and chanted slogans in support of the Iranian delegation. The greeters held purple placards stating that the president's trip to the United States was a success, chanting "Thank you Rouhani," "Greetings, Rouhani," and "Yes to you, not to war."
- Mohammad Javad Zarif, Foreign Minister of Iran: While emphasizing that the phone call was made by US officials, he wrote on his Facebook page on September 29, 2013, that the Americans called "five, six times" to prepare the ground for this phone conversation.
- Hamid Reza Tabatabai Naeini, Deputy Chairman of the Judiciary and Legal Commission of the Islamic Consultative Assembly: The action of the protesters is "disruption of national unity and a clear example of betrayal."
- Ahmad Reza Dastgheib, a member of the National Security and Foreign Policy Committee of the Islamic Consultative Assembly, stated that the President had made the "necessary arrangements" for talks with Mr. Obama. "There is no doubt that the White House has made the phone call," he said.
- Mohammad Taqi Rahbar, Friday prayer Imam of Isfahan: "Death to America is not a verse of the Quran that should always be recited. We treat the United States the same way we treated the Russians in those days and slogans are no longer necessary." He added: "These problems must be resolved with political smiles so that the United States also reduce its sanctions against the Iranian people."
- Alaeddin Boroujerdi, chairman of the National Security Committee of the Islamic Consultative Assembly: "If Mr. Rouhani accepted the proposal of the US President, it was because he would not tarnish the United States prestige anymore."
- Etemad newspaper wrote in an interview with Sadegh Zibakalam: "Today, no matter how much the supporters of enmity with the United States want to stop the relationship, they can not. It's like a damp wall. No matter how much they block it with plaster and cement, they still can not revive it. It is no longer worth saying death to America and burning the American flag by large sections of the educated and elite of the country."
- Ali Akbar Nategh-Nouri: "In the matter of the telephone conversation between the two presidents, it is not the case that the principles and values of the revolution have been violated or disrupted. However, this was a request from US side. Why do those who oppose this move, not point out that during the trip, the repeated requests of the US President to meet with Rouhani were rejected by Iran and the media wrote that this issue has humiliated Obama?
- Ali Larijani, Speaker of the Islamic Consultative Assembly: In a joint meeting with Hassan Rouhani, he thanked him for his stances, speeches, and authoritative presence, as well as his meetings and talks during his trip to New York.
- Mohammad Ali Jafari, commander-in-chief of the Islamic Revolutionary Guard Corps: welcomed Rouhani positions in New York, calling them "appropriate and authoritative," but said the phone call "should have been postponed until after practical US action."

=== Negative ===
- After Hassan Rouhani returned to Iran when he was in the Mehrabad airport, about 100 opponents of Mr. Rouhani's positions and negotiations who were member of the Student Basij gathered at the airport, protesting and chanting slogans against Rouhani. During the demonstration, one of the protesters threw a shoe at Mr. Rouhani's car.
- Kayhan newspaper: In the strongest reactions in this regard, Kayhan newspaper called the conversation between the presidents of the two countries "the most unfortunate" part of Mr. Rouhani's trip to New York. On September 29, 2013, the newspaper devoted its first headline to an article entitled "We gave cash points, we took credit promises," which strongly criticized some of Hassan Rouhani's positions in New York.
- Hossein Shariatmadari, managing editor of Kayhan Newspaper: In an editorial (September 29, 2013), he asked the members of the Government of Hassan Rouhani to explain "what did they give and what did they receive during their trip to New York and in their interaction with the United States and its allies?" emphasizing that "expecting an economic mutation from negotiations and relations with the United States is extremely naive", Shariatmadari wrote the United States, did not give "any concessions" in response to the "appeasement and concessions" offered by the Iranian delegation and "takes this appeasement and tolerance as Islamic Republic's compulsion and need." Elsewhere in the editorial, according to the US National Security Adviser, Susan Rice sayings about that the Iranian side had asked US officials to give Obama a phone call with Rouhani, Shariatmadari stated "If Mr. Rouhani requested the conversation, does not attributing it to the Americans contradict the slogan of the government of the truthful?"
- Hamid Rasaee, a conservative member of Islamic Consultative Assembly, said that the phone conversation was considered by foreign media to be "the surrender of Islamic Iran and the weakness and compulsion caused by the pressure of sanctions." He also said, "The events of the last minutes of your (Hassan Rouhani) trip revived the bitter memory of the Negotiations leading to the Joint Comprehensive Plan of Action, while we hoped that given the recent statements of the revolutionary leadership, you would not forget what evil creature you are softening against. Mr. Rouhani, you really turn the win-lose situation of this trip in favor of Islamic Iran into a win-win situation for both sides at the last moment.
- The website of Rajanews, which is affiliated with the Front of Islamic Revolution Stability, echoed Hamid Rasaee's speeches, mocking Hassan Rouhani's remarks about pursuing a "win-win" game with the West over the nuclear issue, as well as using the phrase "Have a nice day" in English - which Mr. Rouhani is said to have uttered at the end of his conversation with Barack Obama.
- Islamic Associations of Independent Students of Iran: In a statement, it praised Mr. Rouhani for his "active diplomacy" and criticized the meeting between the Iranian and US foreign ministers at the P5 + 1 meeting and the telephone calls of the Iranian and US presidents. In a part of the statement of these students, referring to the recent statements of the Leader of the Islamic Republic about the permissibility of "heroic appeasement" in the field of diplomacy, it is stated: "Heroic flexibility and appeasement never means deviating from the principles and ideals."
- Hossein Salami, the commander-in-chief of the Islamic Revolutionary Guard Corps, said the Americans wanted to compensate their humiliation with a telephone conversation that, if it had not happened, would then Iran's authority in the United Nations stay intact.

=== Other opinions ===
- The Supreme Leader of the Islamic Republic of Iran, Ali Khamenei, in a military ceremony on October 5, 2013, in his first speech after Hassan Rouhani's return from New York, emphasized: "We support the mobilization of government diplomacy, including the New York trip, because we trust and are optimistic about the serving government, but some of what happened during the New York trip was wrong, because we find the US government untrustworthy, arrogant, irrational and unfaithful. We trust our officials and we ask them to take firm steps carefully and with consideration from all sides, and not to forget the national interests." Referring to the Islamic regime's pessimism and distrust of the United States, Khamenei called the US government a government in the hands of the Zionists and added: "The US government is actually moving in the interests of the Zionists and extorting from the whole world and paying a ransom to the Zionist regime."
- Javan newspaper wrote: "Obama's attempt to inform the Zionist regime, or in other words to persuade Tel Aviv to contact Iran directly, was evident in a statement issued by the White House immediately after his telephone call. The US president said in a statement after talks with the Iranian president that his administration would work closely with Israel as it seeks to work with Iran. However, the Daily Beast reports that Congress opposes Obama's direct talks with Rouhani, the majority of whom are Republicans."

== Reactions outside Iran ==
- Abdullah Gül, President of Turkey, from a phone call from the new president of Iran; Hassan Rouhani and Barack Obama expressed satisfaction. He added: "I hope this contact will be a good start in the relations between the two countries." Abdullah Gül also said that he had always encouraged such talks. Hürriyet newspaper also called this phone conversation a historic event. The newspaper also described the phone call as the highest level of contact between the two countries since 1979 (the severance of US-Iranian relations).
- Khaleej Times website: This news site quoted Iranian media as saying that hundreds of Iranians celebrated Hassan Rouhani's return from New York with joy and happiness. The happiness was mostly due to Hassan Rouhani's historic phone call with Barack Obama. The website added that a small number of people shouted Death to America and threw eggs and shoes at the official car of the president who was leaving the Mehrabad airport.
- The Wall Street Journal: The Wall Street Journal newspaper wrote that the 15-minute telephone conversation between Rouhani and Obama, the first of its kind in more than 30 years, was solely about Iran's nuclear program.
- The New York Times: The New York Times said that Hassan Rouhani, by preferring phone calls to face-to-face meetings, avoided creating a politically problematic image of himself with Obama that would provoke extremist concerns in Iran. They established the first dialogue between Iran and the United States after 1979.
- Los Angeles Times: The Los Angeles Times wrote that after the phone conversation between Rouhani and Obama, both of them faced pressure and criticism in their country. The media added that Hassan Rouhani in Tehran was met with encouragement of the proponents and also opponents who threw eggs at him. In the United States, too, Congress reacted quietly and cautiously as a diplomatic response.
- Mercury News: The San Jose Mercury News wrote that conservatives in Iran have taken two approaches to the event, Alaeddin Boroujerdi, chairman of the House National Security and Foreign Policy Committee of the Islamic Consultative Assembly, saying the two presidents' phone call was a signal to Washington acknowledging Iran's power. But some more fanatical conservatives have described the United States as an unchangeable and unshakable enemy.
- Al-Quds Al-Arabi: The Jam News website quoted Al-Quds Al-Arabi as saying that Rouhani agreed to the phone call to protect Obama's reputation.
- Haaretz newspaper: Haaretz wrote that Obama briefed Israeli officials before the telephone conversation with Rouhani.
- CNN: Obama and Rouhani: Dialogue is better than war.
- The Guardian: Obama made historic contact with Rouhani, pointing to the lifting of sanctions.
- Reuters: Rouhani and Obama's historic call.
- Al Arabiya: For the first time in the last 34 years: The US president called his Iranian counterpart.

== Aftermath ==
In 2019, Rouhani redefended the move, saying, "If our Minister of Foreign Affairs had not met with the United States' Secretary of State in New York and I did not answer Obama's phone, the agreement would have been difficult and slow."

== See also ==
- Iran–United States relations during the Obama administration
- Iran–United States relations
- Academic relations between Iran and the United States
- Embassy of the United States of America in Tabriz
- Mahmoud Ahmadinejad's letter to George W. Bush
- Deportation of the Iranian students at US airports
- Correspondence between Barack Obama and Ali Khamenei
