= Correspondence between Barack Obama and Ali Khamenei =

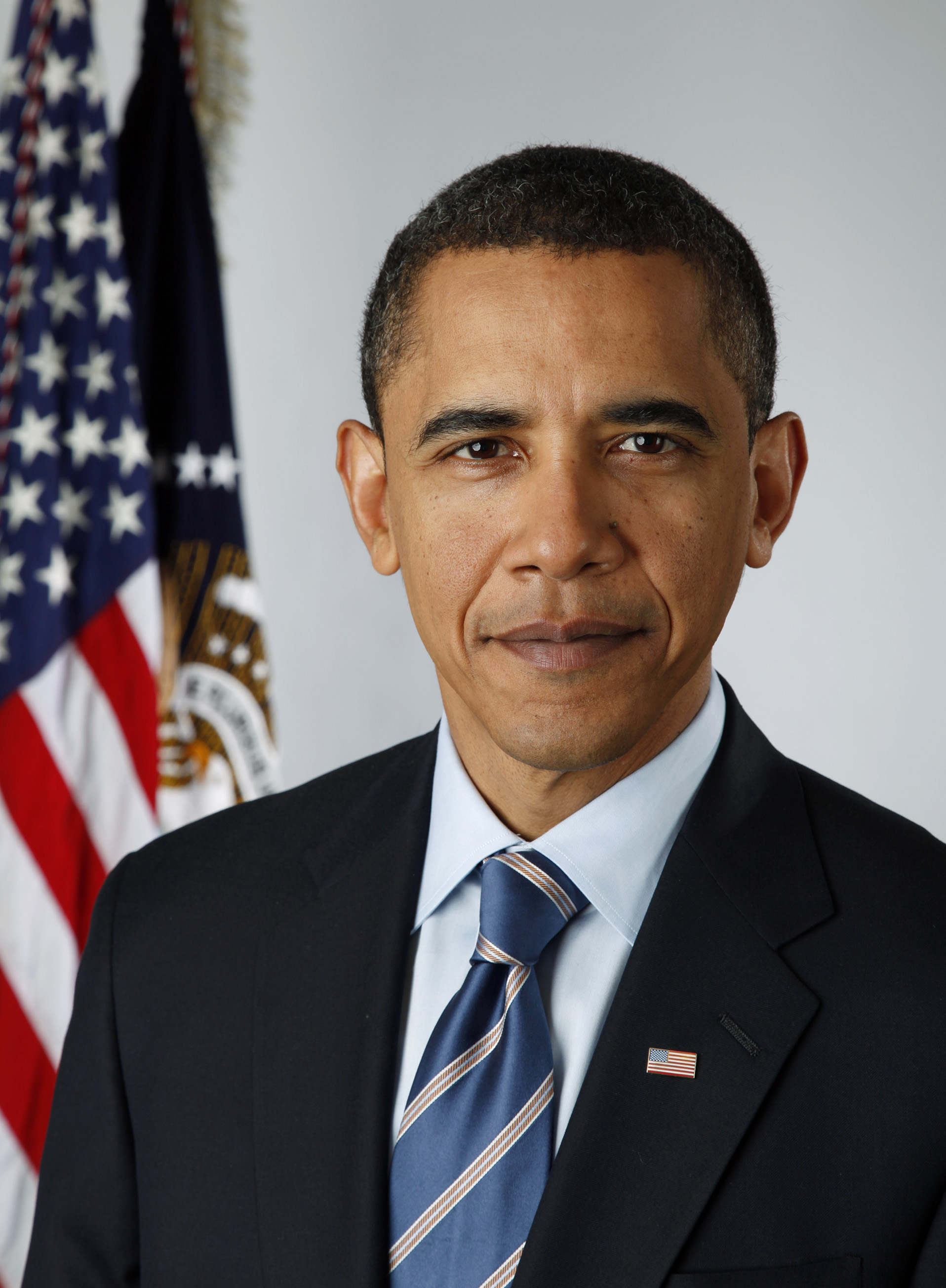
Barack Obama

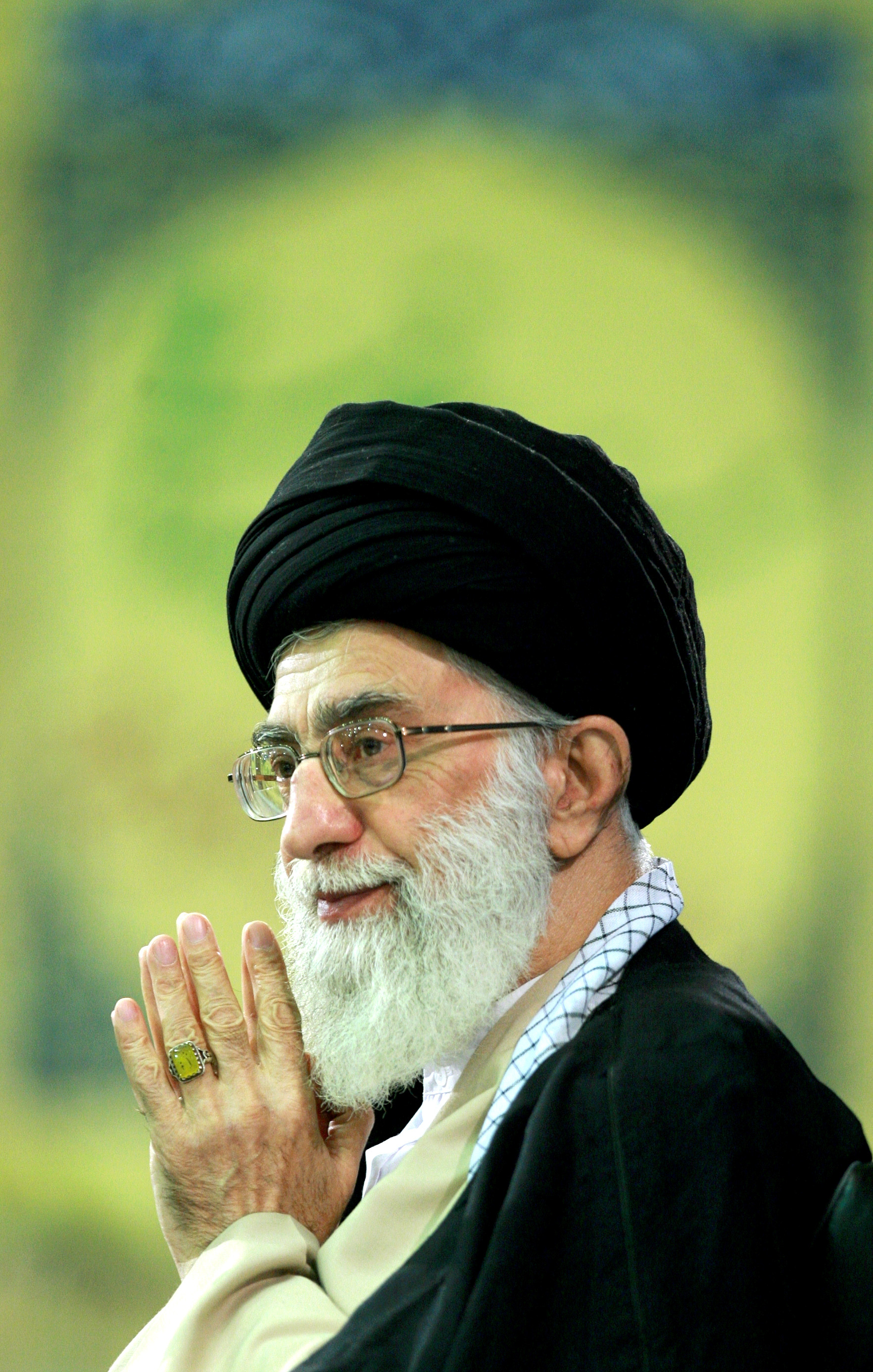
Ali Khamenei

Correspondence between Barack Obama and Ali Khamenei started with direct and confidential letters sent by US President Barack Obama to Iranian leader Ali Khamenei aimed at persuading him to negotiate. Ali Shamkhani, Representative of the Supreme Leader and Secretary of the Supreme National Security Council of Iran, confirmed that his country had responded to some of Barack Obama's letters to the Iranian leader, which focused mainly on the issue of Iran's nuclear program. This was the first time that Iran had confirmed such correspondence with the President of the United States. Earlier, domestic and foreign media reported on Barack Obama's letters to Khamenei, which in one case were confirmed by Hassan Firouzabadi, Chief-of-Staff of the Iranian Armed Forces, as a sign of the US government's realism.

== Obama's letters to Khamenei ==
Obama's first letter was sent in June 2009, and the first mention to this letter was made by Khamenei during his speech in Friday prayers on June 19, 2009, a few days after the beginning of the protests due to Iran's disputed presidential elections. In the same days, CNN reported that, at least until then, the Iranian leader had not responded to Barack Obama's letter.

Obama's second letter was sent in September 2009. The letter was sent after the presidential inauguration of Mahmoud Ahmadinejad, when the protests had somewhat subsided, and was reported first time by the Tabnak news site. In the letter, Obama called for better cooperation between Iran and the United States. About two months later, Khamenei mentioned again to Barack Obama's letters.

Obama's third letter was sent in January 2012. The Iranian parliament representative Ali Motahari, announced the third letter from Barack Obama to the Supreme Leader of Iran in an interview with Fars News Agency in late January 2012. The third letter was sent at a time when nuclear talks between Iran and world powers were actually deadlocked and the only agreement between the two sides in each meeting was on the time and place of the next meeting.

The issue of sanctions on Iranian oil had been serious in the European Union since early January 2012, and some Iranian officials threatened that Iran would cut off oil exports of the Persian Gulf by closing the Strait of Hormuz, if the sanctions were implemented. In his third letter, Barack Obama wrote that closing the Strait of Hormuz is our red line.

Obama's fourth letter was sent in November 2014, on the eve of the deadline for Negotiations leading to the Joint Comprehensive Plan of Action and talks between Iran and the Group of Five plus one. Unlike the previous three letters, which were first announced by Iranian sources, this time the American media, Wall Street Journal, published the news of this letter. In the letter, Barack Obama referred to the common interests of Iran and the United States and spoke about US attacks on the so-called Islamic State (ISIS).

Disseminating reports of the fourth letter provoked a strong reaction from American conservatives. Republican senators John McCain and Lindsey Graham, staunch critics of Barack Obama, called the act of sending this letter "shameful." "I'm telling you that [sending this letter to the Supreme Leader of Iran] will cause a serious problem in the relationship between us and our Sunni partners in the Arab League who are allied with us in the fight against the Islamic State group", also said Mike Rogers, chairman of the Intelligence Committee of the United States House of Representatives, in an interview with the MSNBC channel.

In response to a question from CBS television channel about the fourth letter, Obama said:

I prefer not to talk about my connections with the leaders of different countries of the world. I have many different ways to communicate with different world leaders.

== Khamenei's letters to Obama ==
On February 14, 2015, the Wall Street Journal reported that a letter had been sent by Iranian leader Ali Khamenei to US President Barack Obama. The Wall Street Journal quoted an Iranian diplomat as saying that this letter was written in recent weeks (February 2015) in response of Barack Obama's letter which he wrote to Khamenei in October about the possibility of US-Iranian cooperation in the fight against ISIS if a nuclear deal was reached between the two countries. The diplomat said the Iranian leader's letter was "respectful" but did not contain any commitments or promises.

== See also ==
- Iran–United States relations during the Obama administration
- Mahmoud Ahmadinejad's letter to George W. Bush
- Deportation of the Iranian students at US airports
- United States Diplomatic and Consular Staff in Tehran
- Negotiations leading to the Joint Comprehensive Plan of Action
- United States withdrawal from the Joint Comprehensive Plan of Action
- Academic relations between Iran and the United States
- Phone conversation between Barack Obama and Hassan Rouhani
- United States Cultural Diplomacy in Iran
- Hybrid warfare against Iran
- Iran Mission Center
