= Counterterrorism Mission Center =

Central Intelligence Agency unit founded 1986

- CIA seal

- CIA flag

Agency overview
- Formed: 1986
- Headquarters: George Bush Center for Intelligence, Langley, Virginia
- Agency executive: Assistant Director for Counterterrorism Mission Center
- Parent agency: Central Intelligence Agency

The U.S. Central Intelligence Agency's Mission Center for Counterterrorism (often referred to as the Counterterrorism Mission Center or CTMC, formerly the Counterterrorism Center, or simply CTC), originally known as the Counterterrorism Task Force is a division of the CIA's Directorate of Operations, established in 1986. It was renamed during an agency restructuring in 2015 and is distinct from the National Counterterrorism Center (NCTC), which is a separate entity. The most recent publicly known Assistant Director for Counterterrorism Mission Center was Chris Wood who led the organization from 2015 to 2017.

== Foundation and early years ==
The Counterterrorism Mission Center was established as the Counterterrorism Task Force in February 1986, under the CIA's Directorate of Operations, with Duane Clarridge as its first director. It was an "interdisciplinary" body; many of its personnel and chiefs were drawn from the CIA's Directorate of Operations, but others came from the Directorates of Intelligence and Science and Technology. Observing that terrorism knew no geographical boundaries, the CTC was designed to cut across the traditional region-based bodies of the CIA.

Discredited by the Iran-Contra scandal of 1986, the original aims later gave way to a more analytical role. This did not prevent the Center from contemplating an "Eagle" drone aircraft project in 1986–7, which could have been used to spy on hostage-takers in Lebanon. The idea was unrealistic in terms of the technical abilities of the time. Still, it can be compared to the Predator drone eventually inaugurated in 2000.

Notable early members included Vincent Cannistraro, Chief of Operations and Analysis from 1988 to 1991, Robert Baer, from the Directorate of Operations, and Stanley Bedlington, a "senior analyst."

== The 1990s ==
In the early 1990s, the CTC had no more than a hundred personnel, divided into about a dozen branches. Besides branches specializing in Lebanon's Hezbollah, and secular groups like the Japanese Red Army, another concentrated on Sunni Islamist radicalism, primarily in Algeria. Former CTC director Cofer Black illustrates the evolution of the organization's priorities throughout the 1990s during the 9/11 commission, explaining:

During the early and mid-1990's, al-Qa'ida was not our principal counterterrorism target. Until September 11, Hizballah had killed more Americans than any terrorist group. The Egyptian Islamic Jihad, Hamas, Shining Path in Peru, Abu Saayef in the Philippines, 17 November in Greece, were all threats to Americans or American interests. Personnel and financial resources, management attention, and policymaker interest were spread among these groups.

In January 1996, the CTC opened the Bin Laden Issue Station to track Osama bin Laden and al-Qaeda, with Michael Scheuer, formerly in charge of the CTC's Islamic Extremist Branch, as its first head. The reasons were similar to those for the establishment of the CTC itself. Unlike the traditional country-based ones, the new station was not geographically limited and drew its personnel from across the U.S. intelligence community.

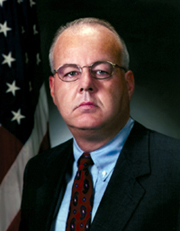
J. Cofer Black, CTC Director 1999–2002

Geoffrey O'Connell was Director of the CTC from 1997 until Cofer Black became Director in June 1999 as part of a reshuffle by CIA chief George Tenet, who was embarking on a plan to deal with al-Qaeda. At the same time, Tenet made one of his executives, Richard Blee, head of the unnamed section in charge of the Bin Laden Station.

Paul Pillar became chief of analysis in 1993; by 1997, he was the center's deputy director. But in the summer of 1999, he suffered a clash of styles with Cofer Black. Soon after, Pillar left the organization. He was replaced as deputy director by Ben Bonk. Henry Crumpton was head of operations in the late 1990s, and came back after 9/11 as chief of a new Special Operations section.

In the late 1990s, the CIA began to set up Counterterrorist Intelligence Centers, in collaboration with the intelligence services of individual countries, to deal with Islamist militants. The CTICs spread widely after the September 11, 2001 attacks, existing in more than two dozen countries by 2005. The local CIA chief of station usually supervises the CIA-vetted officers from the host nations serving in the CTICs.

== "The Plan" (1999–2001) ==
In December 1998, CIA chief George Tenet "declared war" on Osama bin Laden. Early in 1999, Tenet ordered the CTC to conduct a review of the CIA's operational strategy to create "a new, comprehensive plan of attack" against al-Qaeda. By mid-September, the result of this review, known simply as "The Plan", had been briefed to CIA operational level personnel and the NSA, the FBI, and other partners.

Once Cofer Black had finalized his operational plan, Charles E. Allen, associate deputy director of Central Intelligence for Collection, created a dedicated al-Qaeda cell with officers from across the intelligence community. This cell met daily, focusing on penetrating the Afghan sanctuary and ensuring that collection initiatives were synchronized with operational plans. Allen met with Tenet every week to review initiatives.

The CIA increasingly concentrated its diminished resources on counterterrorism, so resources for this activity increased sharply, in contrast to the general trend. At least some of the Plan's more modest aspirations were translated into action. Intelligence collection efforts on bin Laden and al-Qaeda increased significantly from 1999.

=== The core 9/11 hijackers emerge ===
Beginning in September 1999, the CTC picked up multiple signs that bin Laden had set in motion major terrorist attacks for the turn of the year. The CIA set in motion what Black later described as the "largest collection and disruption activity in the history of mankind". They focused on known al-Qaeda terrorists and on senior personnel both inside and outside Afghanistan.

Amid this activity, in November–December 1999, Mohamed Atta, Marwan al-Shehhi, Ziad Jarrah, and Nawaf al-Hazmi visited Afghanistan, where al-Qaeda selected them for the 9/11 operation. In late 1999, the NSA picked up traces of an "operational cadre" consisting of al-Hazmi, his younger brother Salem, and Khalid al-Mihdhar, who were planning to go to Kuala Lumpur, Malaysia, in January 2000. A CTC officer sought permission to conduct surveillance on the men. At about this time, the SOCOM-DIA data mining operation "Able Danger" also identified a potential al-Qaeda unit, consisting of the future leading 9/11 hijackers, and termed them the "Brooklyn cell". The operation found five cells, including two of the three cells involved in the 9/11 attack.

The CIA erratically tracked al-Hazmi and al-Mihdhar as they traveled to and attended the al-Qaeda summit in Kuala Lumpur in early January 2000.

=== The Predator drone (2000–2001) ===
In autumn 2000, a series of flights over Afghanistan by Predator drones, under the joint control of the U.S. Air Force and the CTC, produced probable sightings of bin Laden. CTC Director Black advocated arming Predators with missiles to try to launch a targeted killing of bin Laden, but there were legal and technical issues. Black continued to lobby for Predators armed with adapted Hellfire anti-tank missiles under the new Bush administration in 2001. On Black's advice, Director George Tenet raised the matter at the long-awaited Cabinet-level Principals Committee meeting on terrorism on September 4, 2001, and received authorization to deploy the system.

== 9/11 and the War on Terror (2001–2015) ==
After the September 11, 2001 attacks on the United States, some CTC staff were exempted from an order to evacuate the CIA headquarters building at Langley. They included the shift of the Global Response Center on the exposed sixth floor, which Black had argued was essential to keep operating during the crisis. Tenet finally agreed with Black that their lives would be put at risk.

The CTC obtained passenger lists from the planes used in the attack and identified Khalid al-Mihdhar and Nawaf al-Hazmi, whose names they had first linked with terrorism in the winter of 1999–2000. Tenet later proposed inserting CIA teams into Afghanistan to assist local warlords in the fight against al-Qaeda.

The CIA geared up to take the lead in the attack on al-Qaeda and the Taliban in Afghanistan. The Northern Afghanistan Liaison Team (NALT) team, led by Gary Schroen, entered the country once more on September 26. A new branch was added to the CTC, named CTC Special Operations, or CTC/SO, headed by Henry Crumpton, to locate and destroy al-Qaeda resources. Execution of this mission was nowhere more evident than at Qala-i-Jangi, a 19th-century fortress on the outskirts of the northern Afghan town of Mazar-i-Sharif, when it fell to American allies.

The Global Response Staff (GRS), a security organization of the CIA Directorate of Support, was created after 9/11. The CIA also created Scorpions, an Iraqi paramilitary force.

Gina Haspel, who would later become CIA Director, requested a transfer to CTC in 2001. Her first day was September 11, 2001. She continued at CTC for three years following the attacks.

== Restructuring to CTMC (2015–present) ==
In 2015, the Director of CIA John Brennan introduced sweeping changes to the agency in a modernization effort. In addition to creating the first new directorate for the agency in nearly fifty years, many changes surrounded the creation of 10 new "mission centers" modeled on CTC, which combine analysts and operators in hybrid units focused on specific regions or security threats. Most track longstanding CIA assignments, with centers devoted to weapons proliferation, such as the Near East. These centers essentially replicated the structure of CTC, which by 2015 had grown in size and mission from the war on terror. The changes narrowed CTC's scope, led to the reassignment of its director, Michael D'Andrea, to the newly formed Iran Mission Center, and gave CTC a new name, the Mission Center for Counterterrorism. The name was in line with the nine other announced mission centers, but was criticized by members of the agency, even otherwise in support of the changes, for being clunky. With the move, the role of Director of the Counterterrorism Center was renamed Assistant Director for Counterterrorism Mission Center, and Chris Wood was the first to occupy the newly renamed office. Reviews of the implementation of the changes at CTMC and elsewhere with the new mission centers have been mixed, with parochialism reportedly continuing to belabor the reorganization.

In 2017, the Agency announced the creation of the Korea Mission Center, the 11th such group modeled on the structure of CTC, charged with tackling the threat posed by North Korea.

In March 2020, the Trump administration acting Director of National Intelligence Richard Grenell relieved CTMC Deputy Chief of Analysis and 40-year intelligence veteran Russel Travers from his position as Acting Director of the National Counter-Terrorism Center (NCTC) during a surprise reshuffle. Reports initially suggested he was fired to be replaced by Christopher C. Miller. While ODNI insisted Travers was afforded the opportunity to return to CIA, former coworkers insisted to The Washington Post that he was afforded only the chance to retire. Long seen as redundancy by some in departments of the constituent agencies of the Intelligence Community for having a similar and sometimes overlapping mission with what they see as the territory better left to their units like CTMC, the Trump administration's more significant move to downsize NCTC was less surprising to most than the abrupt dismissal. Travers' deputy on loan from the National Security Agency was also relieved in the shakeup and returned to a position at NSA.

In November 2020, president-elect Joe Biden reportedly considered Darrell M. Blocker, who served as former deputy director of the Mission Center, as a candidate for the role of CIA Director.

== Director history ==
No.	Director	Tenure	President(s) served under
1	Duane Clarridge	1986 – 1987	Ronald Reagan
2	Frederick Turco	1987 – 1991	Ronald Reagan
2	Frederick Turco	1987 – 1991	George H. W. Bush
3	Stephen Richter	1992 – 1994	Bill Clinton
4	Winston Wiley	1994 – 1997	Bill Clinton
5	Geoffrey O'Connell	1997 – 1999	Bill Clinton
6	Cofer Black	1999 – May 2002	Bill Clinton
6	Cofer Black	1999 – May 2002	George W. Bush
7	Jose Rodriguez	May 2002 - November 2004	George W. Bush
8	Robert Grenier	2004 – 2006	George W. Bush
9	Michael D'Andrea	2006 – 2015	George W. Bush
9	Michael D'Andrea	2006 – 2015	Barack Obama
10	Chris Wood	2015 – 2017	Barack Obama
10	Chris Wood	2015 – 2017	Donald Trump
	Classified	2017 – ???	Donald Trump
11	Classified	2017 – ???	Donald Trump
11	Classified	2017 – ???	Joe Biden

== See also ==
- 13 Hours: The Secret Soldiers of Benghazi
- Counterterrorist Intelligence Center
- Private military company
- The Report (2019 film)
