= Chris Wood (CIA) =

American intelligence officer

Central Intelligence Agency Counterterrorism Center

Director
- In office 2015–2017
- President: Donald Trump; Barack Obama
- Preceded by: Michael D'Andrea
- Succeeded by: Classified

Personal details
- Education: George Mason University, B.A.
- Profession: Espionage

Military service
- Allegiance: United States
- Branch/service: Central Intelligence Agency
- Unit: Northern Alliance Liaison Team
- Battles/wars: US Invasion of Afghanistan

John Christopher Wood is a retired operations officer of the Central Intelligence Agency (CIA). After the terrorist attacks of September 11, 2001, he was part of the initial team of seven CIA officers that entered Afghanistan in pursuit of al-Qaeda and the Taliban just 15 days after the attacks. Later he held prominent positions, including Kabul station chief and director of the Counterterrorism Mission Center (CTMC).

== Early life ==
Wood earned a Bachelor of Arts in government and international politics from George Mason University's School of Policy and Government before joining the CIA.

== Career ==
Wood joined the CIA in 1985, serving in various roles throughout the agency's Directorate of Operations.

In 1997 Wood was assigned as a case officer in Pakistan, working under Chief of Station Gary Schroen on operations to find and capture Osama bin Laden, a role he would hold throughout the leadup to the September 11th terrorist attacks. Wood was a mentor of David Tyson, the CIA case officer who was with Johnny Micheal Spann when he was killed at the Battle of Qala-i-Jangi on November 25, 2001. Just fifteen days after the hijackings, Wood was one of the seven- or eight-man advance Northern Afghanistan Liaison Team (NALT) led by Schroen and deputy Phil Reilly inserted by Mi-17 helicopter into Afghanistan on September 26, 2001. They brought a range of skills to bear including proficiency in Russian, Dari, and Persian. Building on the agency's existing relationship with the Northern Alliance, the team collected intelligence on the Taliban, reporting the latest developments back to Headquarters every two hours. Agency officers slept in cramped rooms, often on top of the three cardboard boxes filled with $3 million in $100 bills used to buy support from locals. Small and highly agile paramilitary mobile teams, including CTC Special Operations, or CTC/SO, headed by Hank Crumpton, Greg Vogle, and others followed the NALT, spreading out over the countryside during the day to meet with locals and gather information about the Taliban and al-Qa’ida. In the evenings, they slept outside of town.

As the war in Afghanistan began in earnest throughout 2002, Wood became head of operations at the CIA's Kabul Station, before being transferred back to Virginia a year later to serve in various leadership roles at ALEC Station, the group that led the hunt for al-Qaeda suspects and was central to the interrogation program throughout 2003 and 2004. He ultimately became chief of ALEC Station, while at the same time the 9/11 Commission was scrutinizing the station's actions and inactions in the days and months leading up to the attacks.

In 2010 Wood served a stint as Afghan specialist at the Office of the Director of National Intelligence, before returning to Kabul Station a year later, this time as chief of station, overseeing a far larger unit than he had been a part of eight years earlier. He took the reins of station in Afghanistan at the same time as agency officers who spent years hunting Osama Bin Laden finally found their man. After 2011, Wood served time in Washington, D.C., where he served as the chief to a number of critical agency offices, and his rotational assignments included stints with the Joint Chiefs of Staff, Federal Bureau of Investigation, and Office of the Director of National Intelligence. Some time later Wood became a member of the Senior Intelligence Service when he returned to overseas duty in charge of all operations in Afghanistan and Pakistan, holding the position of an assistant director, and leading several field commands in sensitive overseas assignments.

In 2015, Wood was tapped by Director John Brennan to replace Michael D’Andrea as head of the drone strike program amid a bureaucratic reshuffling. During his appointment, the controversial wide-ranging targeted killing program was the subject of multiple investigations, with President Obama announcing new scrutiny just days before he entered the position, saying "I don't want our intelligence agencies being a paramilitary organization. That's not their function." Wood's appointment to the role was seen by many as an opportunity to compromise with the military's Joint Special Operations Command and decrease the role of title 50 organizations like the CIA in lethal strikes traditionally the purview of title 10 military operations, citing Wood's more "collegial" approach to policy than the widely reported obstructionist approach of his longstanding surly predecessor. Wood continued in the role until retiring in July 2017 after 32 years of service.

== Post intelligence career ==
Wood is a board member of the Third Option Foundation, an organization dedicated to providing support and resiliency to the families of members of the CIA's paramilitary operations units, and which bears the motto of the CIA's Special Activities Center: Tertia Optio.
