= Iran Mission Center =

U.S. government organization responsible for counter-Iran efforts

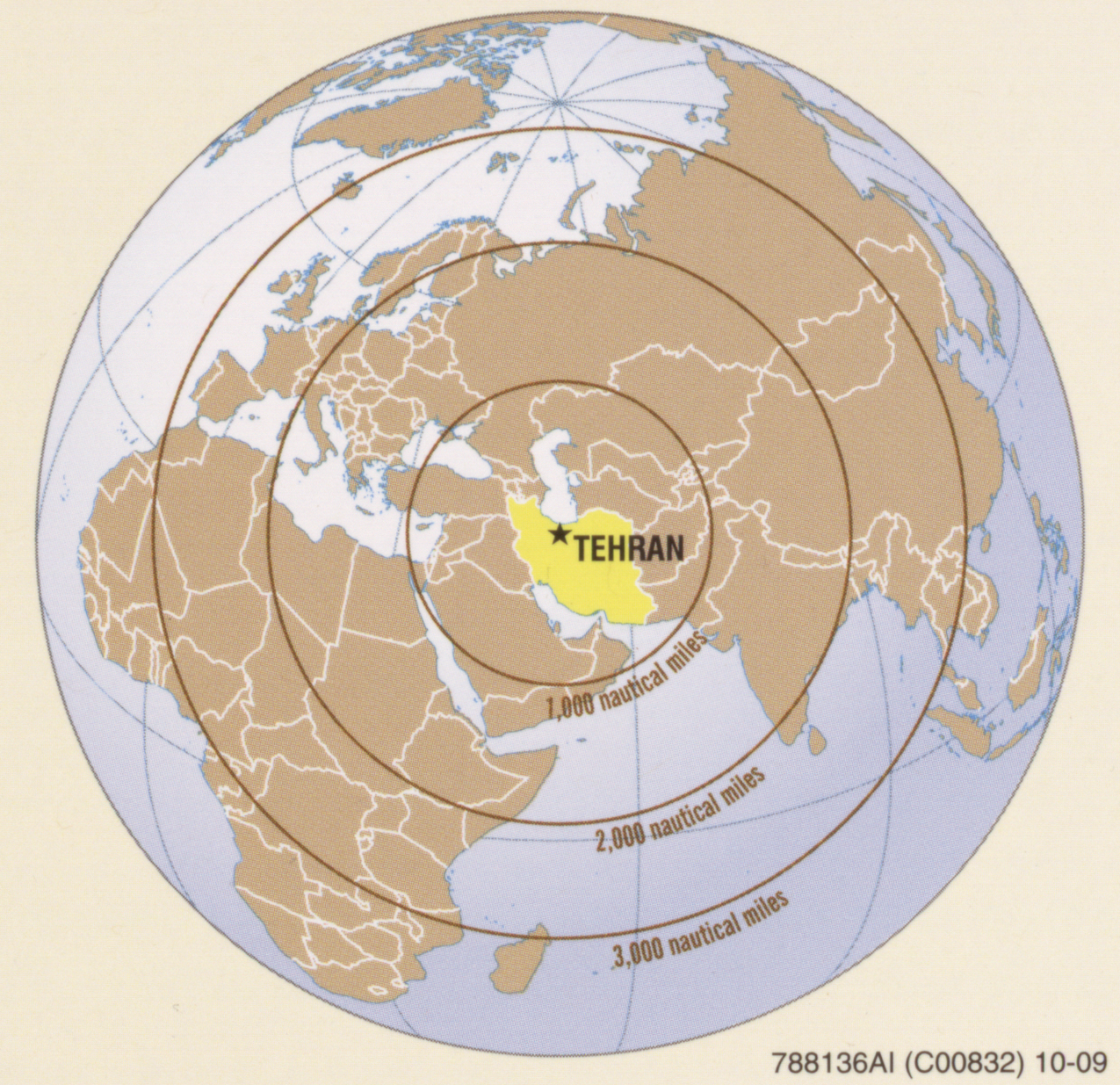

Agency overview
- Formed: June 2017
- Dissolved: Folding it back into the broader Near East Mission Center in early 2022
- Agency executive: Michael D'Andrea
- Parent department: US Central Intelligence Agency

The establishment of the Iran Mission Center was proposed by the Central Intelligence Agency (CIA) in June 2017. This new center was established with the mission of collecting and analyzing information related to the country of Iran. The center has the responsibility to gather all the personnel and analysts related to operations about Iran from other parts of the CIA organization.

== Purpose ==
The establishment of the Iran Mission Center shows that the United States government has placed the order of the Islamic Republic of Iran alongside Russia and North Korea as one of the goals of obtaining information and one of the priorities of the activities of the Central Intelligence Agency of the United States.

Robert Eatinger, one of the former officials of the CIA, said in this regard about Michael D'Andrea, the head of Iran Mission Center, “He can run a very aggressive program, but very smartly”.

Previously, the President of the United States, Donald Trump, called the Islamic Republic of Iran the number one sponsor of terrorism during his election campaign, and Rex Tillerson, the United States Secretary of State, has also taken a tough stance against Iran during the nuclear deal known as the JCPOA.

Mike Pompeo, former head of the CIA, also said about the Iranian government in November 2016: "We are waiting to withdraw from this disastrous agreement with the largest state that supports terrorism in the world." With the establishment of the Iran Mission Center, the United States government has started the covert anti-terrorist information gathering operations under the leadership of Mike Pompeo to conducting counter-terrorist missions.

== History ==
In the US Central Intelligence Agency, there used to be a room called the Pars Room, where analysts and operations personnel related to Iran gathered in this room, which later became a wider regional department.

== Chief ==
Michael D'Andrea was appointed as the head of the Iran Mission Center by the time Director of the Central Intelligence Agency, Mike Pompeo. Michael D'Andrea previously headed the US drone strike programs.

== Iran's reaction ==
So far, Iran has not officially adopted a position in this regard, but Esmaeil Kousari, the former head of the Security Department of the General Staff of the Armed Forces of the Islamic Republic of Iran, said: "The new tactic of the Americans regarding spying on the Islamic Republic of Iran will definitely not reach a result".

== See also ==
- United States Cultural Diplomacy in Iran
- Mahmoud Ahmadinejad's letter to George W. Bush
- Deportation of Iranian students at US airports
- Correspondence between Barack Obama and Ali Khamenei
- United States Cultural Diplomacy in Iran
- Cyberwarfare and Iran
- United States sanctions against Iran
