= United States cultural diplomacy in Iran =

U.S. soft power confrontation with Iran

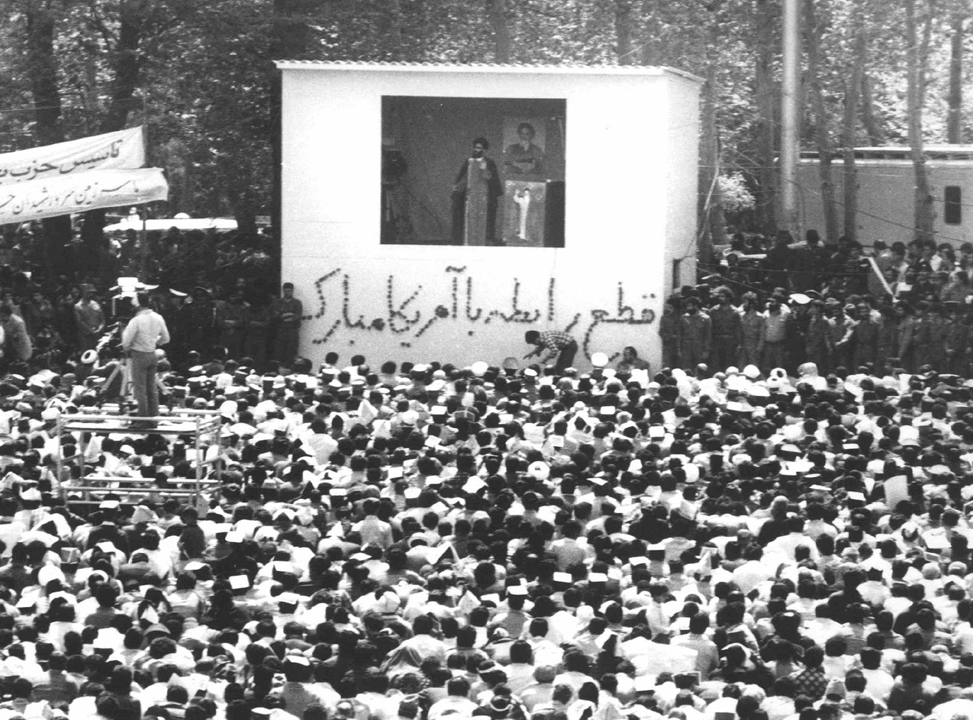
Graffiti: "Congratulations on cutting ties with the United States", Tehran, Iran, 1980.

The United States Cultural Diplomacy in Iran refers to the use of soft power of cultural diplomacy by the US government towards Iran in order to achieve its own interests.

== History ==
Iran and the United States began political relations in 1856, but due to the isolation of US foreign policy and the lack of clarity on Iran's strategic interests, the level of relations did not upgrade to the embassy level until 1944. During World War II, the United States deployed more than 30,000 troops in Iran from December 1942 to early 1944. This massive presence marked the beginning of the discovery of the true importance of Iran. One of the most important aspects of attention to Iran was economic issues, especially oil. That is, the Americans, while protecting their oil interests in the Saudi Arabia, also looked to Iran's oil resources. From 1920, the Americans began their quest for oil concessions in northern parts of Iran. It was in the second half of the 1940s that the United States actively competed with British and Soviet companies and governments on Iranian oil. The first signs of the Cold War emerged during the aftermath of World War II, particularly the US-Soviet conflict over oil in northern Iran and the so-called US ultimatum for the Soviet withdrawal from Iran. To secure its interests from Iran, the United States paid ransom to the Shah of Iran (Mohammad Reza Pahlavi) and continued to interfere in Iran's internal affairs to the point that it led to the active participation of the United States in the 1953 Iranian coup d'état.

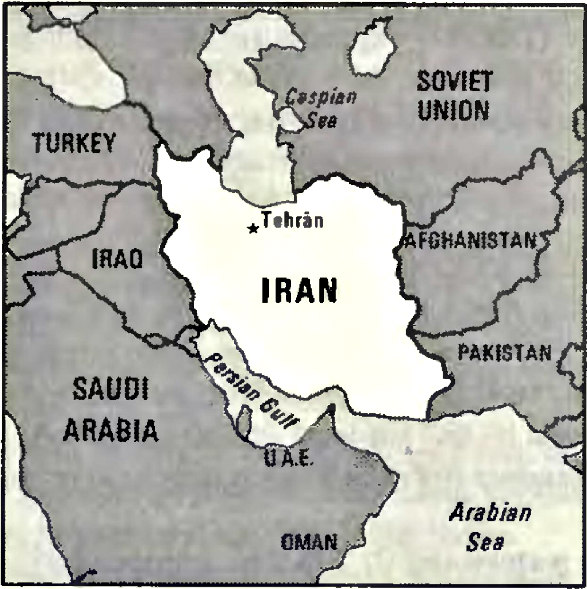
A map of Iran, showing its capital, Tehran, and its location in relation to nearby countries, The World Factbook, 1982

From 1953 onwards, US-Iranian relations entered a new phase; The US Embassy in Iran gradually became the largest US diplomatic mission in the Middle East. In a way, the CIA called Washington's interest in the US embassy in Tehran exceptional. On the one hand, the Shah of Iran insisted on Iran becoming a regional superpower using advanced equipment based on US military training, and on the other hand, the United States sought to keep oil prices low because of the need for Iranian oil and tried to moderate its profits by restoring oil payments by selling military weapons to Iran.

By the late 1960s, the Shah of Iran's blackmail had reached its peak, and the US government was at a standstill in its relations with the Shah. In 1961, with the coming to power of John F. Kennedy as President of the United States, the Shah of Iran was again supported. As a result, the Shah's pressure on the Iranian people increased and political suffocation ensued in Iran. Many US officials protested the US government's support for the Shah of Iran, calling it a violation of democracy. The US government's dual behavior with democratic scheme but utilitarian policies toward Iran eventually led to the massacre of the Iranian people in the 1963 demonstrations, which was the result of US cultural diplomacy in Iran. While the United States was greedy for Iran's oil resources, as the pressure on the Iranian people increased, a revolution was expected to take place in Iran, as in Cuba. In 1967, opposition from US Democratic senators to the authoritarian actions of the Shah of Iran reached its peak. However, the United States government continued to defend the tyrannical government of the Shah of Iran because it better and more supported their interests than a constitutional government.

Despite all US support for Mohammad Reza Shah and even the introduction of reforms known as the White Revolution in Iran, the Iranian people did not remain under the burden of this exploitation. After Ruhollah Khomeini came to political prominence in 1963, the struggle of the Iranian people continued until the 1979 revolution, when the Iran's government system was transformed into the Islamic Republic. Since then, Iran's relations with the United States have been severely strained and the exploitation of Iran by the United States and other colonial powers has stopped.

After the 1979 revolution and the cut off US access to Iran's oil resources, the US government has always spread a kind of cognitive parasite towards Islamic Republic of Iran in the world. Today, the most important ranking criterion of countries and world powers is the extent of influence and diversity of media activities of these countries. In this regard, the United States, with its media power, has always pursued a kind of cultural diplomacy towards Iran, in which it creates a bad mentality among the people about the Iranian government, because the Iranian government has always been opposed to the colonial temperament of the US government in Iran and the Middle East.

== Aspects of US cultural diplomacy ==
The soft power created by the United States through the media and cultural diplomacy has played an important role in creating the demands of the people who want democracy, human rights, and economic and social justice. But at the same time, the rise of popular uprisings in the Muslim and Arab worlds has challenged the United States actions. Useful aspects of the United States cultural diplomacy include:

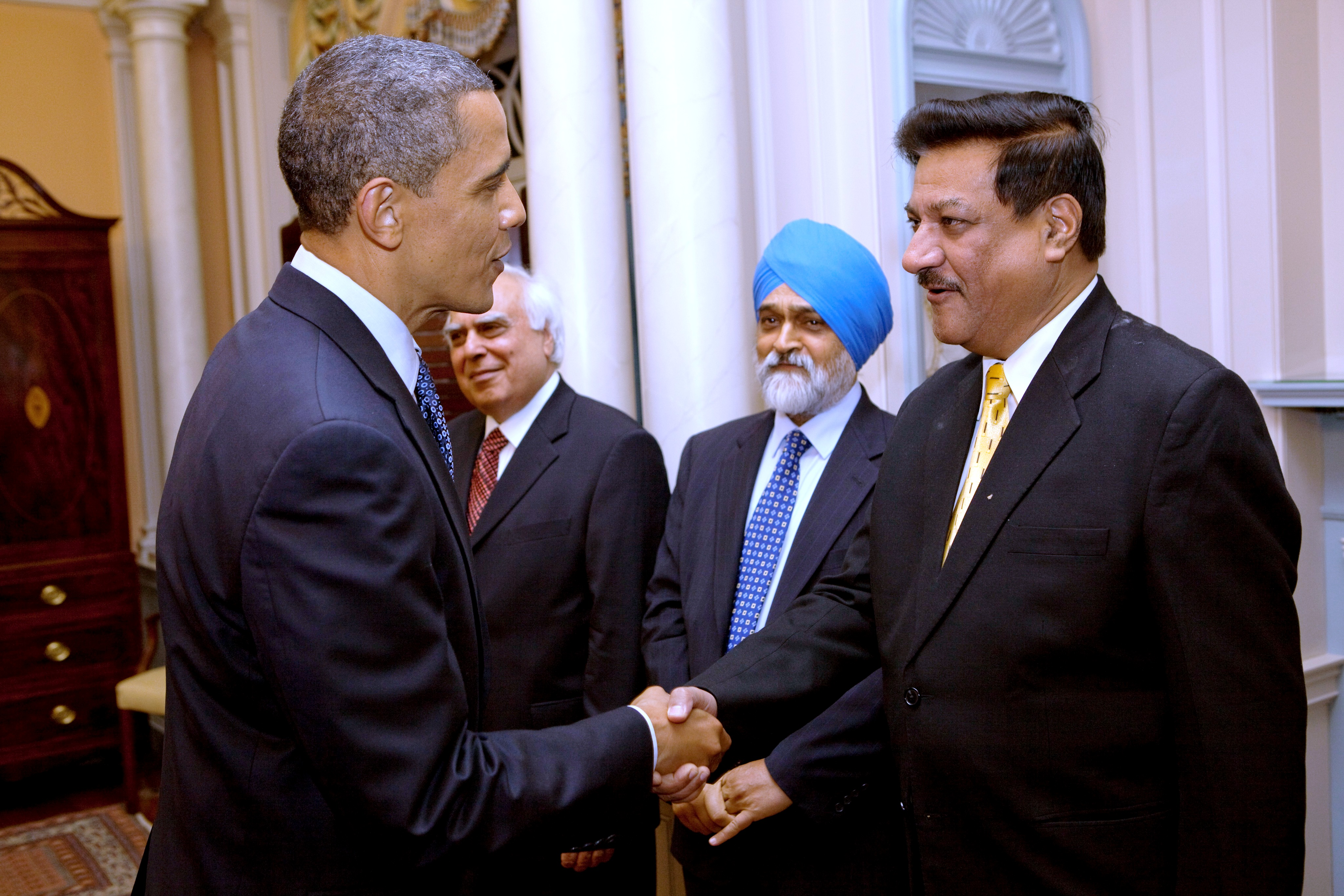
U.S. cultural diplomacy around the world: President Obama shakes hands with high-ranking Indian delegation member.

- Student, professor and researcher exchange programs;
- Academic exchanges;
- Studying about the United States, establish and maintain quality study programs about the United States at foreign universities;
- English language teaching;
- International meetings;
- Citizens' exchanges and interactions;
- Program for building democratic institutions;

The United States cultural diplomacy leads to the formation of discourses, discourse practices, social processes, and knowledge systems through which meanings are generated, recorded, analyzed, and social relations, social identities, subjects, and their capacities become important through it. In the discourses of US cultural diplomacy, different societies share their latent views as a system of shared beliefs and knowledge. US cultural diplomacy is promoted by individuals and social actors, in obedience to the meanings, concepts, values, and norms perpetuated in these discourses and systems of meaning. Therefore, the United States cultural diplomacy covers the following actions:

- Diplomatic actions of the US government in the cultural field;
- Shaping the content of media productions in order to influence public opinion;
- Interfering in the internal cultural relations of countries and trying to influence their cultural backgrounds in order to achieve political goals;

But cultural diplomacy in the form of soft power (unlike war, which is hard power) is being used by the US government as a major project against opponents of its colonialism. Therefore, among the unhelpful aspects of the United States cultural diplomacy are:

- Creating economic turmoil
- Promoting dissatisfaction in society
- Establishment of harmful non-governmental organizations in large volumes
- Distribution of any turmoil through media warfare
- Psychological operations to make the administrative and executive apparatus of the government appear inefficient
- Weakening the government of countries through civilized methods and the creation of culture

== The goals of US cultural diplomacy in Iran ==
The goals of the United States cultural diplomacy in Iran can be considered as a set influenced by the national identity and national interests of this country. In the introduction to the 1964 report, the cultural exchange program was cited as a foreign policy tool, citing the psychological goals of US policy in Iran: US foreign policy and its psychological goals in Iran will be implemented through the cultural exchange program. To achieve these goals, the US Embassy in Iran must show that Iran, with US assistance, is taking rapid steps toward modernization.

In the 1962 performance report of the Iran-US Commission on Cultural and Educational Exchanges, these goals were explicitly stated, explicitly referring to the "role of cultural programs in advancing US policy goals." These goals were as follows:

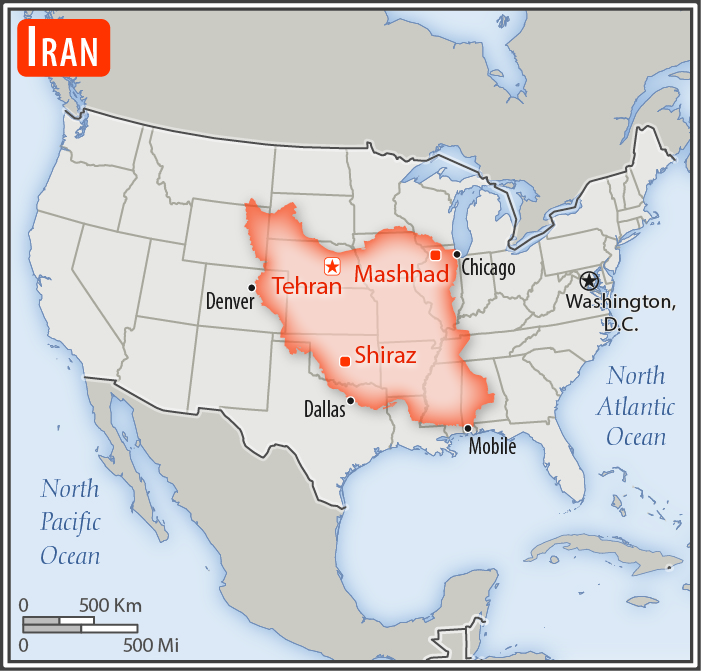
Iran and the United States area comparison

1. Training of leaders, specialists, teachers and youth from the middle class of Iranian society
2. Encourage the creation of new specialties and professions
3. Continued signs of interest in American interests among Iranians
4. Contribute to the growth of secondary education
5. Help promote English as a tool for growing and expanding communication with the outside world
6. Contribute to the growth of higher education and strengthen the scientific foundations of students

In addition, in the following years, with the continuation of the goal-setting process in the document related to the 1964 program for cultural and educational exchange with Iran, goals have been mentioned much more explicitly and with the ability to measure and move:

1. Show the United States as a strong, democratic, and dynamic nation.
2. Inform the Iranians of the Americans' deep respect for Persia's long history and achievements.
3. Show that the American people share in the growing aspirations of Iranians to achieve individual and national progress.
4. Participate in the modernization process of Iran with developing and strengthening English language teaching as a tool to expand communication with the West.
5. Encourage Iranians educated in the United States to participate in the modernization of Iran.

By carefully reviewing the existing set of documents, in addition to the above-mentioned goals, other aspects of the United States cultural diplomacy in Iran that have been explicitly or implicitly considered can be extracted and the following list can be named as its practical goals:

1. Promoting American values and lifestyles as an ideal model
2. Transition from traditional society and strengthening of the pro-Western middle class
3. To give direction to knowledge and universities
4. Promoting English as a scientific and communicative language

== US cultural diplomacy towards the Islamic Republic of Iran ==
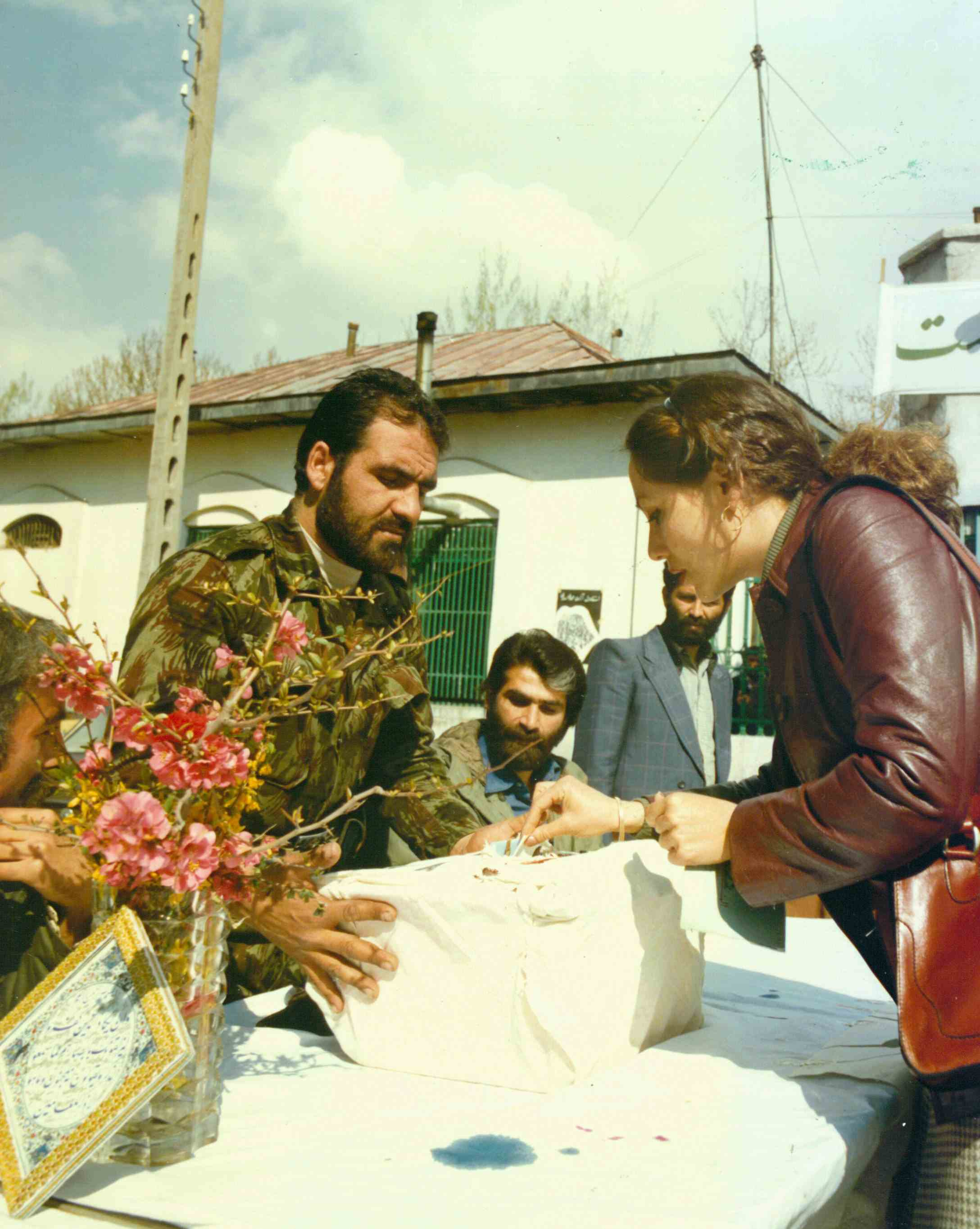
March 1979 Iranian Islamic Republic referendum: It was approved by 98.2% of eligible Iranian citizens.

During the reign of Mohammad Reza Shah on Iran, the US government used cultural diplomacy to secure its oil interests, although it also had benefits for the development of Iranian society. But these benefits were insignificant compared to the price paid by Iranian society. Therefore, the Iranian society left this kind of relationship with the United States forever and demanded its isolation and independence (not easily, but with blood and gore): So the Iranian Revolution of 1979 happened. Since the change of government in Iran to the Islamic Republic in 1979, the United States has been recognized as the country's number one cultural enemy.

With the outbreak of the Islamic Revolution of 1979 in Iran, the Iranian people, led by Ruhollah Khomeini, found new hope and called for the development of their country. The Iranian people, who were mostly poor at the time, wanted to improve their lives and the future by controlling their national resources (especially oil). But the US government never left Iranian society free. Early in the formation of the Islamic Republic of Iran, despite US support for Iranian insurgent groups and even US provocation of Iraq to fight Iran, Iranian society still maintained its purpose and hope and pursued the country's development with empathy. Cultural and political conflicts between the governments of Iran and the United States have diminished this will and empathy. On the other hand, by imposing sanctions on Iran, the United States made the economic situation in Iran difficult. Today, after more than four decades of the Islamic Republic of Iran, what is left of the United States cultural diplomacy in Iran is like a kind of cultural aggression. The US government, by supporting Iranian separatist groups and their mass media, has opened a trail of discontent and protest to Iranian public opinion.

US cultural diplomacy in the form of US soft power towards the Islamic Republic of Iran includes:

- Influencing the public opinion of the society through a soft war plan with targeted and controlled news and information tools;
- Launching Internet sites and providing spy software on their agents inside the country;
- Changing people's minds from their native culture by creating a discourse of attractive features of the West;
- Weakening the national and Islamic culture of Iran through cultural transmutation in order to strongly influence public opinion;
- Facilitating the activities of American NGOs in Iran;
- Mythologizing, legitimizing, and rationalizing through it: Myths such as the freedom of American society or liberal democracy are the best kind of political system;

== See also ==
- Iran–United States relations
- Embassy of the United States of America in Tabriz
- Mahmoud Ahmadinejad's letter to George W. Bush
- Deportation of the Iranian students at US airports
- Correspondence between Barack Obama and Ali Khamenei
- Academic relations between Iran and the United States
- Hybrid warfare against Iran
- Iran Mission Center
