= Mahmoud Ahmadinejad's letter to George W. Bush =

2006 diplomatic initiative

On May 8, 2006, Iranian President Mahmoud Ahmadinejad sent a missive directly to United States President George W. Bush that proposed "new ways" to end the dispute over the Islamic Republic's development of nuclear power.

== 2006 missive ==
U.S. Secretary of State Condoleezza Rice and National Security Advisor Stephen Hadley both reviewed the letter and considered it to be a broad, historic look at the U.S.–Iranian relationship. It was the first direct contact between the American and Iranian heads of state since April 9, 1980.

During his joint press conference with then-United Kingdom Prime Minister Tony Blair at the White House in May 2006, Bush said, "Well, I read the letter of the President and I thought it was interesting. It was, like, 16 or 17 single-spaced typed pages of -- but he didn't address the issue of whether or not they're going to continue to press for a nuclear weapon. That's the issue at hand."

The letter achieved more positive press coverage, particularly in non-Iranian media, than President Ahmadinejad had received before. With Western powers unable to reach agreement about a United Nations Security Council resolution on Iran's nuclear program, The Washington Post said Ahmadinejad's 18-page letter (originally in Persian) promoted the idea that Iran was open to compromise at a time when the rest of the world was divided.

The letter, the first written communication between the leaders of the two countries in 27 years, criticized Bush for the invasions of Afghanistan and Iraq, detainee abuse in U.S.-run facilities at Cuba's Guantanamo Bay Naval Base detention center and Iraq's Abu Ghraib prison, and his support of Israel.

In his letter, Ahmadinejad repeatedly praised Jesus, as well as other figures considered by Muslims to be prophets. He also referred respectfully twice to Moses. He stated his belief that one who claims to follow the teachings of Jesus should not be waging war.

Ahmedinejad also questioned whether Bush could claim to follow Jesus and at the same time invade and occupy countries, kill people, and destroy their homes in the name of democracy.

At one point Ahmadinejad rhetorically asks whether there was infiltration of security services in the terrorist attacks of September 11, 2001, and why aspects have been kept secret (paragraph 28).

The letter received various reactions. "Regardless of the content of Ahmadinejad's letter ... such a communication could lead the two sides to direct talks," the centrist Shargh newspaper said somewhat optimistically. "Whatever its content, the letter crosses the red line of non-negotiation. If Ahmadinejad's letter gets a positive response, a new chapter could open and then we could say it is possible to talk and get results in the shadow of war," it said.

The Iranian newspaper Siasat-e Rooz compared the letter with the historical letter by Ayatollah Ruhollah Khomeini to Mikhail Gorbachev in which he suggested conversion to Islam.

The New York Sun, in their May 11, 2006 editorial, pointed out that the letter followed the format of an Islamic missionary (Da'wa) message, including the traditional ending used by the Islamic prophet Muhammad in his Da'wa messages to the Byzantine Empire's leaders and the nomadic polytheist Arab tribes. The newspaper translated this phrase ("Wasalam Ala Man Ataba'al hoda") as "peace only unto those who follow the true path", and interpreted it as a threat of violence. The phrase is more directly translated as "and peace to whoever follows the path" and is traditional with any Da'wa. The letter also included many references to Jesus as a Muslim prophet, a common signature of Da'wa letters directed towards Christians. The Islamic Republic News Agency says President Ahmadinejad confirmed that the letter was intended as a Da'wa invitation in a press conference.

== 2003 missive ==
According to Mohammad Khatami, in his interview with BBC News, the Iranian government sent a letter to the U.S. government after the fall of Iraqi President Saddam Hussein, but it was ignored. This may have been a retaliation to President Bill Clinton's missive on October 20, 2000, that was ignored. In fact, this was Clinton's second letter to Khatami.

The letter from Iranian authorities in 2003 was confirmed by Lawrence Wilkerson, the chief of staff of Secretary of State Colin Powell.

== See also ==
- Iran–United States relations during the G.W. Bush administration
- Correspondence between Barack Obama and Ali Khamenei
- Deportation of the Iranian students at US airports
- Academic relations between Iran and the United States
- Phone conversation between Barack Obama and Hassan Rouhani
- United States Cultural Diplomacy in Iran
- Hybrid warfare against Iran
- Iran Mission Center
