= Mary Wade Griscom =

American physician

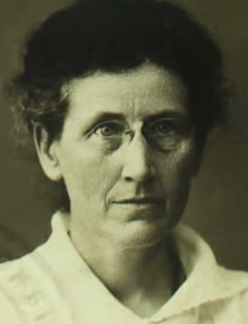
- Mary Wade Griscom, from a 1918 passport application.
- Born: August 24, 1866; Woodbury, New Jersey, US
- Died: November 5, 1946 (aged 80); Philadelphia, Pennsylvania, US
- Occupation: Physician
- Relatives: Arthur Ernest Morgan (brother-in-law)

Mary Wade Griscom (August 24, 1866 – November 5, 1946) was an American physician and medical school professor in China, India, and Persia.

== Early life ==
Griscom was born in Woodbury, New Jersey, the daughter of William Wade Griscom (1831–1895) and Sarah Middleton Cooper Griscom (1839–1895). Her family were prominent Quakers. Her younger sister Lucy married engineer Arthur Ernest Morgan, first chair of the Tennessee Valley Authority.

Griscom earned her medical degree from the Woman's Medical College of Pennsylvania in 1891. She was an officer of the school's alumnae association in 1901 and 1902. She pursued further studies in obstetrics at Vienna with the support of her mentor, Anna Elizabeth Broomall.

== Career ==
Griscom was chief of the obstetrics staff at the Woman's Hospital of Philadelphia from 1903 to 1913. She retired from hospital work after a hand injury limited her surgical skills. Instead, she went overseas, traveled in Korea, and worked with Anna Sarah Kugler in Guntur. She taught at a women's medical college in Canton, and at the Medical School for Women in Vellore. She collected Chinese art depicting Biblical stories, often made as interpretations of Christian missionary work. She worked with the American-Persian Relief Committee on refugee assistance in Baghdad and Tehran in 1918 and 1919. She went to Austria to provide relief work with the American Friends Service Committee in 1923 and 1924.

Griscom embraced new technologies in her professional and personal lives. In 1910, she co-authored a paper on gynecological applications for Roentgen therapy (radiation), for example in the treatment of uterine tumors. She was an early automobile enthusiast, and drove in an "electric vehicle pleasure run" sponsored by the Quaker City Motor Club in 1910, through the streets of Philadelphia.

== Personal life ==
Griscom's family was not universally supportive of her overseas work. Her older brother James C. Griscom's 1934 will specified that "none of his money be used for foreign missions, foreigners, or foreign countries". Mary Wade Griscom died in 1946, aged 80 years, in Philadelphia. Two friends and medical colleagues, Ann C. Arthurs and Mary A. Hipple, a niece Frances and a great-niece were her heirs, with large bequests left for the Woman's Medical College of Pennsylvania and the Woman's Hospital of Philadelphia.
