= Robert Grenier (CIA officer) =

American CIA officer

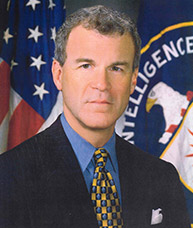

Director of the Central Intelligence Agency Counterterrorism Center
- In office 2004–2006
- President: George W. Bush
- Succeeded by: Michael D'Andrea

Personal details
- Born: Robert Grenier
- Education: Dartmouth College (AB); University of Virginia (MA)
- Occupation: Intelligence officer

Military service
- Allegiance: United States
- Branch/service: Central Intelligence Agency
- Unit: Special Activities Division Northern Alliance Liaison Team
- Battles/wars: United States invasion of Afghanistan

Robert L. Grenier is an American former Central Intelligence Agency officer, who served as the agency’s top counter-terrorism official from 2004 to 2006. After retiring, he became the chairman of a financial and strategic advisory firm.

== Career ==
Grenier joined the CIA in January 1979 and worked field assignments in North Africa, Middle East and Western Europe till 1991. Grenier was station chief in Algiers, Algeria in 1990. He served as Special Assistant to the Under Secretary of State for Political Affairs Peter Tarnoff (1993–94) and first Chief of Operations, Counter-Proliferation Division (1994–96). From 1996 to 1999, Grenier was Director of Operational Training at Camp Peary, Virginia.

=== Pakistan, Afghanistan, Iraq ===
In 2001, Grenier was the CIA station chief in Islamabad, Pakistan, where he helped plan covert operations in support of the U.S. invasion of Afghanistan. In the summer of 2002 he was promoted to the chief of the Iraq Issues Group, where he helped coordinate covert operations in support of the 2003 invasion of Iraq. He wrote the book 88 Days to Kandahar in 2015 recounting his background and role in the response to the 9/11 attack.

Grenier served as Director, CIA's Counterterrorist Center for about a year, but was fired from that position on 6 February 2006 by the Director of the National Clandestine Service Jose A. Rodriguez, Jr. . He was succeeded by Michael D’Andrea. In 2006, Grenier joined Kroll, Inc., as Managing Director.

=== CIA leak case and Libby trial ===
In early 2006, Grenier was identified in court documents in connection with the CIA leak grand jury investigation and charges against I. Lewis "Scooter" Libby.

Grenier told Libby on June 11, 2003, one month before the leak of Valerie Plame's CIA identity, that she worked for the CIA and was involved in arranging her husband Ambassador Joseph Wilson's 2002 trip to Niger. Libby claims to have forgotten about the conversation.

On January 24, 2006, Grenier testified in Libby's trial on perjury and obstruction of justice charges, telling jurors that Libby asked him for information about Joseph Wilson's investigatory trip to Niger on June 11, 2003, and that he reported back to Libby about Wilson's wife's involvement in the trip, as well as Wilson's wife's employment by the CIA, later on June 11. Grenier did not mention Plame's name to Libby, which appeared in a column by Robert Novak a month later.

Grenier testified that it was unusual to get a call from Libby, and unusual to be called out of a meeting with CIA director George Tenet to supply Libby with answers. Wilson was sent on the February 2002 investigatory mission by the CIA, Grenier said, because the Office of the Vice President wanted answers about reports of uranium purchases from Niger, although the State Department and the Bureau of Intelligence and Research were interested in the CIA's take as well. Grenier testified that later media reports about the leak, which suggested Libby may have originally learned about Plame a month later from journalists, prompted him to contact CIA lawyers about his earlier conversations with Libby. According to Grenier, Libby thanked him personally a few days later for the information about Wilson's trip, telling him it had been "useful".

== Post-intelligence career ==
In 2009 Grenier was appointed Chairman of ERG Partners, an independent financial and strategic advisory firm solely focused on the security and intelligence sectors. He is a lifetime member of the Council on Foreign Relations.

=== Political commentary ===
In the wake of the January 6 United States Capitol attack, Grenier argued in an op-ed for The New York Times and interview with NPR that widespread violence from "the dawn of a sustained wave of violent insurgency within our own country, perpetrated by our own countrymen" may be imminent, describing former President Trump's popularity as "insurgency leadership" in "subversion of the Constitutional order." He compared Trump's enduring presence in American politics to Saddam Hussein and Osama Bin Laden, suggesting that avoiding reconstruction era violence requires a sustained domestic counter-insurgency campaign to "affect the environment" and a concerted effort to publicly shame and permanently diminish Trump. He described conviction of the former president in his second impeachment trial as a national security imperative.

== See also ==
- Peter Bergen
- Gary Berntsen
- Cofer Black
- Gary Schroen
