= Michael D'Andrea =

Central Intelligence Agency officer

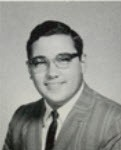
- Portrait of Michael D'Andrea (circa 1969)

Central Intelligence Agency Iran Mission Center

Director
- In office 2017–2021
- President: Donald Trump; Joe Biden
- Preceded by: unknown
- Succeeded by: position eliminated

Central Intelligence Agency Counterterrorism Center

Director
- In office 2006–2015
- President: George W. Bush; Barack Obama
- Preceded by: Robert Grenier
- Succeeded by: Chris Wood

Personal details
- Born: 1954 (age 71–72)
- Spouse: Faridah Currimjee D'Andrea
- Profession: Espionage
- Nicknames: "Ayatollah Mike"; "The Prince of Darkness"; "The Dark Prince"; "The Undertaker"; Roger (cover identity)

Michael D'Andrea (born 1954) is a retired Central Intelligence Agency officer who played an instrumental role in American counterterrorism efforts during the war on terror. He served nine years as director of Counterterrorism Center (CTC), and held a major role in the manhunt for Osama bin Laden. His 42-year career has been described as among the most consequential in the recent history of the CIA, and he has been called the most lethal leader in the U.S. government for his tenure. He is widely credited with revolutionizing the CIA's terrorist-hunting efforts, and vastly expanding the program of targeted killings by drone strike used heavily against Al-Qaeda. "If he was a combatant commander, he would have been sitting in the gallery for the State of the Union, he would have had all the accolades, and then some, that David Petraeus ever had," said one former senior CIA official. "He ran that war."

In 2017 D'Andrea was appointed to head the agency's Iran Mission Center, one of the earliest moves in what became the 'maximum pressure' strategy of the Trump administration against Iran. In January 2020, there were false reports of his death in a plane crash in Afghanistan. In 2021, the CIA acknowledged his forced retirement after a renewal of his mandatory retirement waiver was denied. Director of the CIA William J. Burns noted the "remarkable impact" of his career.

== Early life and education ==
D'Andrea was raised in Northern Virginia. His family has ties to the CIA that span two generations. He met his wife while working overseas with the Central Intelligence Agency, and converted to Islam in order to marry her. His wife, Faridah Currimjee D'Andrea is a daughter of a wealthy Muslim family from Mauritius with Gujarati origins. She serves as a senior director of Currimjee Group, a business conglomerate owned by her family with holdings including print media, telecommunications, real estate, tourism, financial services and energy.

== Career ==
D'Andrea joined the CIA in 1979, and he was considered an underperformer at "The Farm", the CIA's training center at Camp Peary, Virginia. He reportedly began his overseas career in Africa, and he was listed as a foreign service officer at the Embassy of the United States in Dar es Salaam, Tanzania. D'Andrea served as chief of station in Cairo, Egypt and later in Baghdad, Iraq.

=== Global war on terrorism ===
D'Andrea is credited with an instrumental role in the war on terror, with The New York Times concluding "perhaps no single CIA official is more responsible for weakening Al Qaeda". Prior to the attacks he was reportedly one of the CIA officials who failed to track one of the hijackers, Nawaf al-Hazmi. Following 9/11 D'Andrea was deeply involved in the CIA's detention and interrogation programs, and his operatives also oversaw the interrogations of Abu Zubaydah, Abd al-Rahim al-Nashiri and Khalid Shaikh Mohammed, which were criticized in the unclassified executive summary of a 2014 United States Senate report. He also targeted affiliate terror groups, and was reportedly involved in the assassination of Hezbollah member Imad Mughniyah in Damascus, Syria.

He initially became head of the CIA's Counterterrorism Center in 2006, replacing Robert Grenier. During his nine-year tenure, he presided over hundreds of American drone strikes in Pakistan and Yemen, including so-called "signature strikes", advocating for the program to the United States Congress. According to former U.S. officials, with D’Andrea at the helm, the CIA's counterterrorism center functioned like a continuous, rolling decapitation operation for al-Qaida leadership.

He later received blame for the Camp Chapman attack in Khost, Afghanistan, when seven CIA officers were killed by a suicide bomb detonated by a triple agent allegedly backed by Pakistan's ISI. The bomber, Humam Khalil Abu-Mulal al-Balawi, an Al Qaeda affiliate recruited by Jordanian Intelligence, had been invited to Camp Chapman after claiming to have information related to senior al-Qaeda leader Ayman al-Zawahiri. Al-Balawi was not searched as a sign of respect because of his perceived value as someone who could infiltrate the ranks of senior al-Qaeda leaders.

D'Andrea later directed the analysis of competing hypotheses as to who, besides Osama bin Laden, could be in the compound in Abbottabad, Pakistan where Bin Laden was later found and killed.

In 2015, leadership of the drone program was passed to Chris Wood, following bureaucratic reshuffling by Director John Brennan, who some report clashed with D'Andrea repeatedly.

=== Iran mission ===
After leaving the drone program and CTC, and failure to secure the position of deputy director of Operations, D'Andrea accepted what was widely seen to be a demotion, reviewing ongoing operations in an oversight role. New opportunities emerged when the Trump administration renewed a focus on Iran. From 2017 to his forced retirement in 2021, D'Andrea served as leader of the CIA's Iran Mission Center, which was expanded during the hard line approach to Iran adopted by the Trump administration. It was also alleged that D'Andrea was involved in the operation that killed Iranian General Qasem Soleimani. At D'Andrea's retirement in 2021, the CIA discontinued the Iran Mission Center, folding it back into the broader Near East Mission Center in early 2022.

=== Unmasking ===
Stemming from his career in the clandestine service, D'Andrea was described using a number of aliases. During his time at the CTC, many reporters referred to him only by the first name of his cover identity "Roger", which was considered unusual for an official not posted overseas. His personal quirks garnered attention from the media, attracting a mythic legend. A chain smoking workaholic and Muslim convert, whose job entailed targeting Muslim extremists, other nicknames attributed to D'Andrea by colleagues and reporters include "Ayatollah Mike", "the Prince of Darkness", "the Dark Prince", and "the Undertaker." In Kathryn Bigelow's 2012 film Zero Dark Thirty, a fictionalized CIA officer based on D'Andrea is known simply as "The Wolf".

D’Andrea's biography and quirks became part of his legend: the soft-spoken, professorial figure notorious for keeping all the lights dimmed in his office; the chain smoker who would spend hours exercising on the elliptical, drinking Mountain Dew; and the middle-aged convert to Islam who ran a lethal campaign targeting Muslim religious extremists.

Despite years in a prominent CIA assignment, D'Andrea's real name did not become public until a 2015 profile by Mark Mazzetti of The New York Times, one month after leaving the role of CTC director. His outing by the paper while still an active undercover officer of the CIA prompted backlash from many former intelligence officers, particularly after Iranian state media published photos of D'Andrea and his wife the following day. In an opinion piece in the Washington Post, conservative author Marc A. Thiessen said that Iran often targeted Americans it considered enemies, such as with the murder of Bill Buckley, the Beirut station chief kidnapped, tortured, and executed by Islamic Jihad in 1985. Mazzetti defended his decision, contending he was compelled to act after a January 2015 signature strike in the southern Pakistani region of Waziristan, which led to the collateral deaths of aid workers Warren Weinstein and Giovanni Lo Porto. The strike was authorized by D'Andrea and CIA leadership independent of White House oversight, and also killed American-born al Qaeda commanders Adam Yahiye Gadahn and Ahmed Farouq, who were the intended targets.

== In popular culture ==
D'Andrea was the inspiration for the character of "The Wolf" in Kathryn Bigelow's Zero Dark Thirty.
