= Contents of the United States diplomatic cables leak (Iran) =

Content from the United States diplomatic cables leak has depicted Iran and related subjects extensively. The leak, which began on 28 November 2010, occurred when the website of WikiLeaks—an international new media non-profit organisation that publishes submissions of otherwise unavailable documents from anonymous news sources and news leaks—started to publish classified documents of detailed correspondence—diplomatic cables—between the United States Department of State and its diplomatic missions around the world.

== Iran–Arab relations ==
The cables suggest an American feeling of strong distrust by Arab government leaders for Iran, and encouragement from pro-U.S. Arab leaders for a military strike on the nuclear facilities in Iran. Saudi King Abdullah has repeatedly urged the U.S. to attack Iran's nuclear facilities. In one diplomatic cable, King Abdullah said it was necessary to "cut the head of the snake", in reference to Iran's nuclear program. This remains problematic, as many Arab leaders have refrained from publicly criticizing Iran, due to popular support for the country.

=== Iran–UAE relations ===
Muhammad bin Zayed, Crown Prince of Abu Dhabi, urged the U.S. not to appease Tehran and said that Iranian President "[Mahmoud] Ahmadinejad is Hitler".

=== Iran–Bahrain relations ===
King Hamad of Bahrain was quoted in 2009 as saying, "[the Iranian nuclear program] must be stopped. The danger of letting it go on is greater than the danger of stopping it."

=== Iran–Egypt relations ===
Major-General Muhammad al-Assar, assistant to Egyptian Defense Minister Mohamed Hussein Tantawi, was quoted in 2009 saying that "Egypt views Iran as a threat to the region".

== North Korean missiles ==
U.S. intelligence has assessed that Iran obtained from North Korea advanced missiles (derived from a Soviet design) that are more powerful than publicly admitted by the U.S. to be in Iran's possession. These missiles, designated the BM-25, have a range of up to 2,000 miles (3,200 km).

== Internal conflict ==
The United States suggested there had been a rift between Ahmadinejad and Revolutionary Guards commander Mohammad Ali Jafari. It cited an incident during a Supreme National Security Council meeting when Ahmadinejad stated (in regards to dealing with opposition protests) that "'people feel suffocated,' and mused that to defuse the situation it may be necessary to allow more personal and social freedoms, including more freedom of the press" to which Jafari replied "You are wrong! [In fact] it is you who created this mess! And now you say give more freedom to the press?!;" he then allegedly slapped Ahmadinejad in the face. An uproar ensued and the SNSC meeting was called off, until Ayatollah Ahmad Jannati reconciled the two.

== Re-emergence of the Tudeh Party ==
There are also reports that the long-banned Tudeh Party is gaining ground with the government employees and the working-class population, and that they were reportedly the driving force behind recent strikes.

== Health of Ali Khamenei ==
An unidentified ally of former Iranian President Akbar Hashemi Rafsanjani stated that Supreme Leader Ali Khamenei has terminal leukemia and is expected to die in months, and Rafsanjani's unwillingness to act after the disputed 2009 Iranian presidential election comes from his wish to succeed Khamenei and annul Ahmadinejad's election afterwards.

== Exploitation of the Iranian Red Crescent Society ==
Reports that the Iranian Red Crescent Society was alleged to be actively controlled by the government and was involved in illicit arms smuggling and intelligence gathering on behalf of Iran.

== U.S. sanctions ==
A cable from the U.S. State Department indicated that the U.S. was pushing for co-operation from its allies to impose further sanctions on Iran in response to its nuclear program.

== Iranian–Canadian intelligence correspondence ==
Jim Judd, former director of the Canadian Security Intelligence Service told U.S. State Department official Eliot A. Cohen that "he and his colleagues are 'very, very worried' about Iran." CSIS had talked recently to Iran's Ministry of Intelligence and Security after they requested its own "channel of communication to Canada". The Iranians had agreed to "help" with the War in Afghanistan, including sharing information regarding potential attacks, although they declined the offer. Judd also noted that "we have not figured out what they are up to," adding that it was clear the Iranians wanted the NATO military force in Afghanistan to "bleed slowly."

== Organized crime ==
According to a cable sent from the U.S. embassy in Baku, Azerbaijan, in 2009, there is a "widespread rumor" that many Iranians in Baku conduct in illicit activities and that these activities are tied to Iran. These activities include sanctions-busting, money laundering, obtaining spare parts, equipment and revenue generation for the Islamic Revolutionary Guards and management of narcotics trafficking originating from Iran. The cable mentions that many Iranians residing in Baku from different backgrounds, including students, business figures, and human rights activists are involved in these activities.
