= Distinguished Career Intelligence Medal =

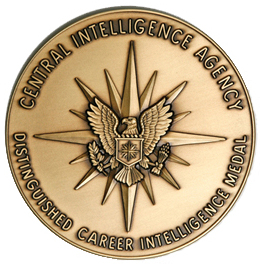
- Awarded for: "An individual’s cumulative record of service reflecting a pattern of increasing levels of responsibility or increasingly strategic impact and with distinctly exceptional achievements that constitute a major contribution to the mission of the Agency."
- Country: United States of America
- Presented by: Central Intelligence Agency
- Eligibility: Employees of the Central Intelligence Agency

Precedence
- Next (higher): Intelligence Medal of Merit
- Next (lower): Career Intelligence Medal

The Distinguished Career Intelligence Medal is awarded by the Central Intelligence Agency for an individual's cumulative record of service reflecting a pattern of increasing levels of responsibility or increasingly strategic impact and with distinctly exceptional achievements that constitute a major contribution to the mission of the Agency.

== See also ==
- Awards and decorations of the United States government
