= Urmia University of Medical Sciences =

Medical school in Urmia, Iran

- دانشگاه علوم پزشکی ارومیه; Danushgah-e 'lum Pezeshki-ye Arumih
- Type: Public
- Established: 1985
- President: Mohamadamin Valizad Hassanlouyi
- Location: Urmia, West Azarbaijan, Iran
- Campus: Urban
- Website: www.umsu.ac.ir

Urmia University of Medical Sciences is a medical school in Urmia, West Azarbaijan, Iran.

Urmia University of Medical College Established on 1980 as part of Medical School of Urmia University. In 1985 under supervision of Iranian Ministry of Health the school detached from Urmia University and a new university established with the name of Urmia University of Medical Science.

The university has six schools (medicine, pharmacy, paramedical, health, nursing, and dental) and administers public hospitals in and around the city of Urmia.

== History ==
Joseph Cochran, one of the children of immigrant missionaries, was born in 1855 in the city of Urmia. After completing his childhood and secondary education, he traveled to the United States, where he finished his higher education in medicine. He then returned to his birthplace, Urmia, with the idea of establishing a hospital and a medical school.

In 1878 (1257 SH), with the cooperation of his colleagues, he began constructing a large hospital with a capacity of one hundred beds. The hospital included two general wards for non-infectious diseases, five small rooms for infectious diseases, two operating rooms, and a large pharmacy room. A large basement was built at the entrance of the hospital for anatomical dissection and use as a morgue. Construction of the hospital was completed in 1879. During this period, Cochran provided medical and public health services to the people of Urmia in a building located at the present site of the Faculty of Nursing and Midwifery of Urmia University of Medical Sciences.

After completion and equipping of the hospital, and due to the shortage of medical and healthcare staff, Dr. Cochran decided to establish a medical college. For this purpose, a separate building was constructed near the hospital specifically for the medical school. This building is the well-known wooden structure that still remains alongside other buildings at Urmia University. Students of the medical college, after completing five years of theoretical and practical training, were awarded the degree of Doctor of Medicine. The first graduating class consisted of 27 students, who went on to practice medicine in cities throughout the Azerbaijan region.

In 1977 (1356 SH), the Faculty of Medicine began its activities as one of the educational units of Urmia University under the supervision of the Ministry of Culture and Higher Education, admitting 48 medical students. In 1986 (1365 SH), following the approval of the law establishing the Ministry of Health, Treatment, and Medical Education, this faculty was transformed into Urmia University of Medical Sciences.

== Chronology of the Chancellors ==
Dr. Alaeddin Mehri, M.D., Cardiologist 	                                1986-1992 
Dr. Aboltfath Lameie, M.D., Infectious Disease Specialist              	1992-1994
Dr. Javad Aghazadeh, M.D., Neurosurgeon                	                1994-2000
Dr. Nemat Bilan, M.D., Pediatrician 	                                    2000-2002
Dr. Ali Taghizadeh Afshari, M.D., Urologist 	                            2002-2006
Dr. Nosratollah Mollazadeh, M.D., Infectious Disease Specialist 	        2006-2011
Dr. Koroush Saki, M.D., Psychiatrist 	                                    2011-2013
Dr. Javad Aghazadeh, M.D., Neurosurgeon 	                                2013-2021

Dr. Mohammad Amin Valizad, Professor of Anesthesiology 2021-....

== Vice Chancellors ==
- Vice Chancellor for Education: Rahim Mahmodlou Professor of Thoracic Surgery at Urmia University of Medical Sciences, specializing in surgical treatment of diseases of the chest, lungs, and esophagus.
- Vice Chancellor for Food and Drug: Hadi Abbasian Assistant Professor of Pharmacoeconomics and Pharmaceutical Administration – Specializes in pharmacoeconomics, pharmaceutical management, healthcare costs, and the economic evaluation of medications and healthcare services.
- Vice Chancellor for Health Affairs: Dr. Payam Nozad Assistant Professor specializing in anesthesiology, intraoperative care, and the management of patients' conditions before, during, and after surgery.
- Vice Chancellor for Research: Hamidreza Khalkhali Professor of Biostatistics – Specializes in statistical methods, data analysis, epidemiological research, and the design and evaluation of clinical studies.
- Vice Chancellor for Student and Cultural Affairs: Jamileh Amirzadeh Associate Professor of Gerontology – Specializes in aging, age-related health conditions, older adults' well-being, and the social and health factors influencing the aging process.

== Schools and Faculties ==
- School of Medicine
- School of Allied Medical Sciences
- School of Health
- School of Nursing and Midwifery
- School of Dentistry
- School of Pharmacy
- Mahabad School of Medical Sciences
- Khoy School of Medical Sciences
- Salmas School of Nursing
- Miandoab School of Medical Sciences
- Bukan School of Nursing
- Naqadeh School of Health and Higher Education Complex

== Fields of Study ==
School of Medicine

Doctor of Medicine, MBBS, Anatomical Sciences, Clinical Biochemistry, Epidemiology, Medical Microbiology, Medical Parasitology, Medical Physics, Microbiology, Clinical Nutrition, Physiology Master, Molecular Medicine, Clinical Biochemistry, Microbiology, Clinical Toxicology, Cellular & Molecular Biology, Anesthesiology & Critical Care, Cardiovascular Diseases, General Surgery, Internal Medicine, Neurology, Neurosurgery, Obstetrics & Gynecology, Orthopedics, Pathology, Pediatrics, Radiology, Urology

School of Allied Medical Sciences (Paramedical Sciences)

Operating Room, Health Information Technology, Laboratory Sciences, Radiology, Anesthesiology, Medical Informatics, Medical Informatics, Health Information Technology, Radio-biology

School of Public Health

Public Health, Occupational Health Engineering, Environmental Health Engineering, School Health, Ergonomics, Health Economics, Health & Treatment Services Management, Health Education & Health Promotion, Vector Biology & Control of Diseases, Occupational Health Engineering, Occupational Health & Safety Engineering, Environmental Health Engineering, Elderly Health, Occupational Health, Health Economics

School of Nursing & Midwifery

Nursing, Midwifery, Medical Emergency, Medical Surgical Nursing, Psychiatric Nursing, Master, Consultation in Midwifery, Critical Care Nursing

School of Pharmacy Pharm.D.

School of Dentistry DDS

== Hospitals ==
- Shahid Motahari Medical and Educational Center is a public teaching hospital located on Kashani Street in Urmia, West Azerbaijan Province, Iran. Originally established in 1928 as the former Shir-o-Khorshid Hospital, it was the first hospital in Urmia, initially operating with 25 beds and an outpatient clinic. Today, it has 251 active beds and 400 approved beds, providing pediatric healthcare services alongside medical education and clinical training.

- Ayatollah Taleghani Educational and Medical Center is a public teaching hospital located in Urmia, West Azerbaijan Province, Iran. Established in October 1980, the hospital provides specialized services in internal medicine, infectious diseases, cardiology, dermatology, toxicology, and dialysis. It has 197 active inpatient beds and 121 dialysis beds, and includes an inpatient department (IPD). The center serves as a regional referral and teaching hospital.

- Kowsar Women's Medical Center is a specialized teaching hospital located in Urmia, West Azerbaijan Province, Iran. Established in 2021, it focuses primarily on women's healthcare and provides specialized services in obstetrics and gynecology, surgery, oncology, and perinatology. The hospital has 309 beds and 15 wards, and is equipped with diagnostic facilities and a helipad for emergency air services.

- Seyyed al-Shohada Hospital is a specialized public teaching hospital located in Urmia, West Azerbaijan Province, Iran. Established in 1992 and officially inaugurated in October 2009, the hospital has 153 beds and provides medical services in cardiology, cardiac surgery, internal medicine, pediatrics, and intensive care. Its facilities include angiography equipment and three operating rooms. The hospital provides specialized cardiovascular and other medical services to patients in northwestern Iran.

- Imam Khomeini Medical and Educational Center is a teaching and referral hospital located in Urmia, West Azerbaijan Province, Iran. Established in 1995 and officially inaugurated in 1996, the hospital has 583 active beds, 689 approved beds, and 29 inpatient departments. Its medical specialties include internal medicine, general surgery, neurosurgery, neurology, orthopedics, urology, ophthalmology, and trauma care. The center also provides kidney and corneal transplantation services, as well as services for international patients.

- Razi Educational and Medical Center is a specialized psychiatric hospital affiliated with Urmia University of Medical Sciences and located in Urmia, West Azerbaijan Province, Iran. The center provides diagnostic and treatment services for people with mental health disorders and individuals seeking addiction treatment. It also functions as a teaching and research center, supporting medical education and research in mental health.

- Tadbir Specialized and Subspecialized Clinics and Limited Surgery Center is a healthcare facility affiliated with Urmia University of Medical Sciences and located in Urmia, West Azerbaijan Province, Iran. The center began operations in 2018 and occupies a 16-story building with a total area of 25,000 square meters. It provides a range of specialized and subspecialized outpatient and surgical services, supported by academic physicians and modern medical facilities.

== Research institutes ==
- Cellular and Molecular Medicine Research Institute
- Clinical Research Institute

== Research centers ==
- Urmia Lake Cohort Study Center
- Cellular and Molecular Research Center
- Comprehensive Research Laboratory
- Nephrology and Kidney Transplantation Research Center
- Food and Beverage Safety Research Center
- Reproductive Health Research Center
- Social Determinants of Health Research Center
- Experimental and Applied Pharmaceutical Sciences Research Center
- Neurophysiology Research Center
- Solid Tumor Research Center
- Maternal and Childhood Obesity Research Center
- Patient Safety Research Center
- Clinical Research Development Unit (CRDU)
- Hematology, Immune Cell Therapy, and Stem Cell Research Center

== Ranking ==
According to the latest results published by Times Higher Education (THE), Urmia University of Medical Sciences has been ranked 701–800 globally in the World University Rankings 2027. Furthermore, the university has achieved a global ranking of 501–600 in the Medical and Health field.

According to the July 2026 edition of Webometrics, Urmia University of Medical Sciences was ranked 3,543rd among universities worldwide, 48th nationally in Iran, and 1,466th in Asia. The ranking also reported the university's positions in impact, openness, and academic excellence indicators.

== Scientific Journals ==
Urmia University of Medical Sciences publishes several scientific journals covering different fields of medical and health sciences, including the following:

Health Science Monitor: A scientific journal covering research and developments in health sciences.

Journal of Research in Applied and Basic Medical Sciences: A scientific journal publishing research in applied and basic medical sciences.

Nursing and Midwifery Journal: A scientific journal focusing on nursing, midwifery, and related healthcare research.

Studies in Medical Sciences: A scientific journal publishing research in various fields of medical sciences.

== See also ==
- Higher education in Iran
- List of universities in Iran
