= United States Diplomatic and Consular Staff in Tehran =

1980 International Court of Justice case

- Court: International Court of Justice
- Full case name: Case Concerning the United States Diplomatic and Consular Staff in Tehran (United States of America v. Iran)
- Decided: November 29, 1979
- Citation: [1980] ICJ Rep 3

United States of America v. Islamic Republic of Iran [1980] ICJ 1 (also called the Case Concerning United States Diplomatic and Consular Staff in Tehran) is a public international law case (issued in two decisions) brought to the International Court of Justice by the United States of America against Iran in response to the Iran hostage crisis, where United States diplomatic offices and personnel were seized by militant revolutionaries.

On November 4, 1979, the United States Embassy in Tehran, Iran was attacked by armed Iranian students belonging to the Muslim Student Followers of the Imam's Line. The students overtook the embassy as a show of support for the Iranian Revolution. Over sixty American diplomats and citizens were taken hostage, and the crisis lasted for 444 days until January 20, 1981. While some hostages were released earlier, 52 remained in captivity until the end of the crisis.

During the takeover, the guards assigned to protect the U.S. Embassy mysteriously disappeared, and the Iranian government did not make any attempts to stop the attack or rescue the hostages. The U.S. attempted to arrange meetings with Iranian authorities to negotiate the release of the hostages, but Ayatollah Khomeini, the leader of the Iranian Revolution, forbade any such meetings. In response to the hostage crisis, the United States severed diplomatic relations with Iran, imposed trade sanctions by halting U.S. exports and oil imports, and froze Iranian assets.

== Judgments ==
The International Court of Justice (ICJ) issued two significant decisions regarding the Iran hostage crisis:

1. The first decision, an Order of Provisional Measures, was issued on December 15, 1979. This order did not address the merits of the case but instead aimed to preserve the rights and obligations between the United States and Iran while the court deliberated on the final decision. In this order, the ICJ unanimously declared that Iran should restore the U.S. Embassy in Tehran to U.S. possession, release the hostages, and provide diplomatic officials with the full protections mandated by the Vienna Convention on Diplomatic Relations.
2. The second decision addressed the merits of Iran's actions. However, Iran did not participate in the proceedings.

It is noteworthy that this case marked a significant instance where the ICJ and the United Nations Security Council collaborated to bring an end to a crisis.

The ICJ examined the case in two phases. The first phase focused on the armed attack on the U.S. Embassy in Tehran by Iranian militants and students. The question at hand was whether these individuals were acting as 'agents' of the Iranian Government. In the second phase, the court considered the series of events that occurred after the occupation of the embassy by militants and the seizure of the consulates.

On May 24, 1980, the ICJ rendered its judgment. Regarding the first question, the court found that the militants and students were 'agents' of the Iranian Government because the government had approved and supported their actions, thus transforming the occupation of the embassy and the detention of the hostages into official acts of the state. As a result, the perpetrators, though initially acting in private capacities, were considered agents of the Iranian state.

== See also ==
- List of International Court of Justice cases
