= Deportation of Iranian students at US airports =

2019–2020 US problems with Iranian students

- Date: August 2019 to January 2020
- Location: US airports
- Type: Discrimination
- Cause: Tensions between Iran and the United States

Deportations of Iranian students at US airports were a series of events that began in 2019 and continued until 2020, when the COVID-19 pandemic began. In this series of events, Iranian students, despite having a valid student visa, were detained at US airports and later deported. These expulsions have been on the rise since 2019.

According to The New York Times, from August 2019 to January 2020, at least 16 Iranian students were detained and deported after arriving at US airports despite having valid student visas. The American Civil Liberties Union reports that the largest number of deports came from Logan International Airport in Boston. Some deportees have been barred from re-entering the United States and will not be able to apply for US visas in the future.

The Ministry of Foreign Affairs of Iran has called the expulsion of Iranian students from US airports "illegal and racist". The US government says visas do not necessarily guarantee entry into the United States, and people at border crossings are re-examined.

These events decreased in 2021 with the coming to power of 46th US President Joe Biden. He also ended the law banning Iranians from traveling to the United States.

== Causes ==
"Most of these Iranian students" say they were not informed of why they were barred from entering the United States. The U.S. Customs and Border Protection said that the reason for preventing visa holders from entering the United States was health, crime and security concerns, in which case the applicant must prove otherwise.

Deported students have been asked questions such as their views on political events in Iran and their activities on social media.

Officials at the Border and Customs Administration told NBC reporters that the reason for some Iranian students' deportation was that US entry officers identified people with family ties to members of "terrorist" organizations and prevented them from entering US territory.

Several deported Iranian students said they were questioned at the airport by officers about their compulsory military service and accused of having links to the Islamic Republic of Iran's military and security institutions.

According to Carol Rose, the executive director of the American Civil Liberties Union in Massachusetts, the reasons for the deportation of foreign students remain a mystery. It is not clear if this is a Boston Customs Office decision or a decision made by the Trump administration, because all of this is done in secret. The increase in this trend may be due to the fact that many students are entering Boston as it is one of the most important centers of higher education. Of course, some arbitrary agents may have made such a decision out of personal hatred of the Iranians.

According to Michael McCarthy, the U.S. Customs and Border Protection spokesman, less than one percent of Iranian passengers arriving at the Boston airport were deported in 2019. He said the U.S. Customs and Border Protection has strict regulatory policies to ensure that the procedures for inspecting and reviewing passenger records are carried out within the framework of all constitutional and legal requirements. The U.S. Customs and Border Protection is committed to protecting the civil rights and civil liberties of any individual who encounters them. Its officers are trained to enforce US law uniformly and fairly, and not to discriminate on the basis of religion, race, ethnicity or sexual orientation.

=== Political tensions or health conditions? ===
This issue, which has become more acute as tensions between the United States and Iran escalate, is troubling for Iranian students, immigrant advocates, and for American universities. According to Terry Hartle, Senior Vice President at American Council on Education, university campuses are increasingly concerned about what happens at entry ports of the United States, because the deportation of students is unpredictable and seemingly random. These days, visas for international students are not valid until they enter the campus. The U.S. Customs and Border Protection said that due to changing health standards during the COVID-19 pandemic, etc. new conditions have been added to the country's entry inspections, and there is no guarantee that visa holders will be allowed to enter the United States. But NGOs, immigration advocacy groups and lawyers say this situation is beyond normal. The U.S. Customs and Border Protection has not released statistics on the number of Iranian students who have been barred from entering the country and have been deported in 2019 and 2020, saying it could not release details due to privacy concerns.

== Concerns ==
When an Iranian MSc student of Northeastern University was arrested upon arrival at Logan International Airport and on the verge of deportation, protestors who had been informed of the deportation order closed the entrance hall of the airport and brandished signs with "Protect Iranian students" and "Stop discrimination against Iranians" written on them. They were overjoyed to learn that a federal judge had temporarily suspended any attempt to expel the Iranian student in a ruling, but when the case came to the forefront of national attention the next day, the Iranian student Mohammad Shahab Dehghani had previously deported against the order of the federal judge. It is a matter of great concern that the U.S. Customs and Border Protection has not complied with the Federal Court's ruling.

According to Terry Hartle, the number of international students in the United States has been declining after a decade of steady growth. In addition to the fact that international students are no longer more willing to continue their studies in the United States than in the past, the process of deporting international students from the United States has become a concern for American universities.

According to the latest government statistics, more than one million international students are studying in the United States, more than 12,000 of whom are Iranian.

== See also ==
- Iran–United States relations during the first Trump administration
- United States Diplomatic and Consular Staff in Tehran
- Contents of the United States diplomatic cables leak (Iran)
- 2009–2011 detention of American hikers by Iran
- U.S. raid on the Iranian Liaison Office in Erbil
- Academic relations between Iran and the United States
- United States cultural diplomacy in Iran
- Iran Mission Center
- Deportation of Indian nationals under Donald Trump
