= Office of Special Operations =

Former office of the CIA

The Office of Special Operations (OSO) was an office of the Central Intelligence Agency (CIA) and its predecessor, the Central Intelligence Group (CIG). The head of OSO was the Assistant Director for the Office of Special Operations (ADSO), the first to hold that title being Donald H. Galloway.

== OSO at the Central Intelligence Group (1946 - 1947) ==
After the end of World War II, on July 11, 1946, at the behest of Louis Fortier and John Magruder, the National Intelligence Authority (NIA) granted the head of the Central Intelligence Group (CIG), Admiral Sidney Souers, to create within the structure of CIG a new office which would absorb personnel and functions from the Strategic Services Unit (SSU). The OSO was created under the CIG as a result of National Intelligence Authority Directive No. 5, which centralized espionage and counterintelligence operations under the director of central intelligence (DCI), at that time being Sidney Souers.

The OSO also absorbed the clandestine activities in Latin America, previously performed by the Special Intelligence Service of the Federal Bureau of Investigation.

The OSO was tasked with the clandestine collection of foreign intelligence and the execution of counterintelligence operations outside the United States. This involved establishing a long-term clandestine espionage organization to gather critical information on foreign entities. During its early operations, the OSO faced challenges such as a lack of trained personnel for specific missions. For instance, efforts to support the 8th Army in Korea were hindered by insufficiently trained staff, leading to a reevaluation of resource allocation to prioritize long-term espionage operations.

The National Security Act of 1947 established the CIA, officially replacing the CIG. The OSO was then integrated into the new agency as its covert intelligence arm.

== OSO at the Central Intelligence Agency (1947 - 1952) ==
When the CIA was established in September 1947, the OSO continued its clandestine intelligence functions, now with greater authority under the newly structured intelligence agency.

In the early part of the Cold War, the OSO greatly expanded and strengthened its activities, including its human intelligence (HUMINT) collection in Eastern Europe, the Soviet Union, and Asia, focusing on Cold War espionage. It also Supported covert resistance efforts against communist expansion, particularly in Soviet-occupied territories and China.

OSO also conducted counterintelligence operations against Soviet espionage efforts in Western Europe and the United States, alongside the FBI.

In August 1952, the Office of Special Operations was combined with the Office of Policy Coordination (OPC) to form the Directorate of Plans (DPP), which later became known as the Directorate of Operations.
