= Donald Henry Galloway =

American intelligence officer (1898–1980)

Donald H. Galloway
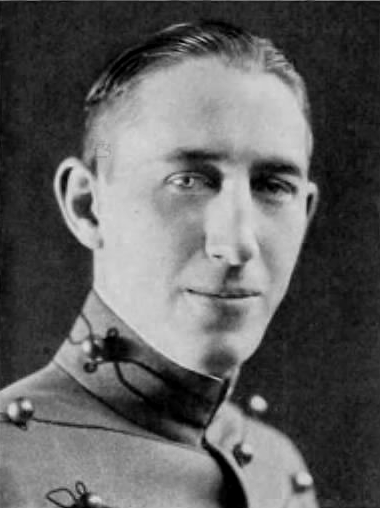

CIA Assistant Director of the Office of Special Operations
- In office September 18, 1947 – December 27, 1948

CIG Assistant Director of the Office of Special Operations
- In office July 11, 1947 – September 18, 1947

3rd Director of the Strategic Services Unit
- In office July 1, 1946 – October 19, 1946
- Preceded by: William Wilson Quinn
- Succeeded by: Office Abolished

Personal details
- Born: October 17, 1898 New York City, U.S.
- Died: December 12, 1980 (aged 82) Lake Wales, Florida, U.S.
- Resting place: Arlington National Cemetery
- Education: United States Military Academy
- Awards: Bronze Star Medal; Legion of Merit; Legion of Merit (Oak Leaf Cluster in lieu of the 2nd award)

Military service
- Allegiance: United States
- Branch/service: United States Army; Central Intelligence Group; Central Intelligence Agency
- Years of service: 1917–1954
- Rank: Colonel
- Commands: Fort Myer
- Battles/wars: World War I; World War II; Cold War; Korean War

Donald Henry Galloway (October 17, 1898 – December 12, 1980) was an architect of the modern United States Intelligence Community, being given the assignment as the first assistant director of the Office of Special Operations (ADSO), first at the Central Intelligence Group (CIG), and later when it was transitioned into the Central Intelligence Agency (CIA). He was a United States Army veteran of World War I, World War II, the Cold War, and the Korean War. His role in Korea was critical to the peace process of 1953, helping to negotiate the armistice with the North Koreans and Chinese at Panmunjom that ended the fighting. He was awarded the Legion of Merit twice.

== Life ==
Galloway, a native of New York City, served in the 23rd District of the New York National Guard during World War I. Following his service, he enrolled at the U.S. Military Academy at West Point, where he graduated in 1923. In the years between the world wars, he held various cavalry assignments across the United States and later returned to West Point as an instructor, teaching economics, government, and history.

During World War II, Galloway was an intelligence officer with the 6th Army Corps in North Africa and Italy and later deputy chief of staff of the corps.

=== Career as the first ADSO ===
After the war, on July 11, 1946, at the behest of Louis Fortier and John Magruder, the National Intelligence Authority (NIA) granted the head of the Central Intelligence Group (CIG), Sidney Souers, to create within the structure of CIG a new office which would absorb personnel and functions from the Strategic Services Unit (SSU).

The SSU had been created immediately following the end of World War II, when President Truman issued an order providing William J. Donovan ten days to shut down the Office of Strategic Services (OSS). Donovan was noted as being furious at the order, and pleaded with Washington to keep the capabilities of Strategic and Special services within the US government. Those clandestine duties were then passed to the SSU.

Now, in 1946, the new office at CIG which would absorb those duties of the SSU, thereby consolidating U.S. clandestine intelligence activities under a unified command, would be called the Office of Special Operations (OSO). This reorganization aimed to create a professional and secure clandestine service, setting the foundation for future CIA operations.

Colonel Galloway's tenure as ADSO was marked by efforts to establish effective liaison relationships with foreign intelligence services, while maintaining the security and integrity of U.S. operations. His contributions were pivotal in shaping the early structure and policies of American intelligence during a critical period in its development.

Galloway continued in his position as ADSO at the Central Intelligence Agency (CIA), when the new agency was created by Congress, and reintegrated clandestine activities into the United States intelligence apparatus. However, he only remained at CIA until 1949.

=== Korean War ===
Galloway was next assigned to Japan, where he served in various staff roles. He remained in Japan during the beginning of the Korean War, where he was placed directly in charge of the Joint Strategic Plans and Operations Group (JSPOG), Far East Command, by General Edwin K. Wright.

Galloway's JSPOG team developed Operation Bluehearts, which was initially canceled due to unfavorable conditions.

During a conversation with James H. Doyle, Galloway sketched out Douglas MacArthur's plan for Incheon, and Doyle infamously responded: "Don, if you think a plan like that would work, you ought to have your head examined."

Galloway was also part of the team that negotiated the armistice with North Korean and Chinese representatives at Panmunjom. In his personal memoir of the Korean Armistice, Herbert Goldhamer wrote his opinion of Galloway:

"The top representative of GHQ (JSPOG) at the camp was Colonel Galloway. Colonel Galloway conceived himself as being a sort of watchdog who would not permit anything to be done that was not strictly GI. He felt himself to be a watchdog for General Ridgway as the top representative of General Ridgway's own headquarters. He was a person who had little or no understanding of the problems of negotiation with the Communists and whose primary concern seemed to be that nothing should be done that could possibly lead to trouble, either in GHQ or JCS. He was a stickler for following every and any directive or appearance of a directive, no matter how deep a misunderstanding the directive may have been based upon... Colonel Galloway... objected extremely vigorously to my being allowed to attend the meetings... Colonel Galloway was probably the only person in the camp who consistently resented my presence in the camp and the role I played. This arose not so much out of any difference of opinion about policy or from any clash of personalities as such, but from the strong tendency for Colonel Galloway to be extremely "GI" in all his attitudes."

=== Later life ===
He retired from the Army in 1954 while serving as the commanding officer of Fort Myer, Virginia.

His first wife died in 1957.

Following his military career, he became president of Rampart Life Insurance Company, a position he held until his second retirement around 1971. He split his time between homes in the Washington, D.C., area and Lake Wales, Florida until 1975, when he relocated permanently to Florida.
