= Louis Joseph Fortier =

US Army general

Louis J. Fortier
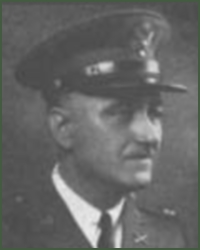

CIG Assistant Director and Acting Chief of Operational Services
- In office 1946–1947

US Military Attaché to Yugoslavia, Greece, and Bulgaria
- In office 1939–1941

Personal details
- Born: 8 April 1892 Gretna, Louisiana, U.S.
- Died: 6 November 1974 (Aged 82) New Orleans, U.S.
- Resting place: Arlington National Cemetery
- Education: Tulane University; Auburn University
- Awards: Distinguished Service Medal (U.S. Army); Legion of Merit; Bronze Star Medal; Legion of Honor; Croix de Guerre; Star of Karageorge; Greek Military Order; Czech Military Order; Belgian Military Award

Military service
- Allegiance: United States
- Branch/service: United States Army; Central Intelligence Group; Central Intelligence Agency
- Years of service: 1913–1950
- Rank: Brigadier General
- Commands: 94th Infantry Division
- Battles/wars: World War I; World War II; Cold War; Korean War

Louis Joseph Fortier (6 April 1892 – 6 November 1974) was an American army general. He was a decorated United States Army soldier and war hero and veteran of World War I, World War II, the Cold War, and the Korean War, and was also one of the architects of the modern United States intelligence community, being present for the creation of the Central Intelligence Agency. He also helped create the Joint Forces Staff College and the ROTC program at Auburn University.

== Life ==
In 1913, Fortier graduated from Tulane University with a Bachelor of Engineering in Civil Engineering, and became a registered professional engineer. His first assignment with the military was not as a combat soldier, but as a civil engineer for the Army Corps of Engineers. Soon enough, however, he did commission as an officer in the United States Army Reserve.

On 8 August 1917, after passing the examinations for the Regular Army, Fortier was commissioned as a second lieutenant in the United States Army Field Artillery.

During World War I, Fortier was an artillery officer in France. He served in France through three major engagements, including the Battle of Belleau Wood, with the 17th Field Artillery of the Second Division.

In September 1918, he became an instructor of "gunnery" at Fort Sill, Oklahoma. In 1919, he established the Reserve Officers' Training Corps Field Artillery Unit at Auburn University. In 1923, he received a Master of Science Degree, summa cum laude, from the Alabama Polytechnic Institute (later absorbed by Auburn University).

Fortier then attended the Battery Officer Course at the Field Artillery School. From 1933 to 1936, Fortier attended the Command and General Staff College at Fort Leavenworth, Kansas. In 1936, he was sent to the Army War College (then located in Washington at what is now Fort McNair). In 1939, Fortier was sent to study at the Ecole Superieure de Guerre in Paris, France.

At the outbreak of World War II in Europe, before the United States had entered the war, Fortier was already posted in the city of Belgrade as the US military attaché to Yugoslavia, Greece, and Bulgaria. While he was stationed here in Serbia, Germany launched the Invasion of Yugoslavia, and Fortier was the only representative of the Diplomatic corps with the responsibility to suspend the bombardment of the city.

The official notice of his award for his Distinguished Service Medal here reads:

Lieutenant Colonel Fortier was charged with the mission of making contact first with the Yugoslav Prime Minister at Zvornik and, later, with the German authorities in Hungary with a view to ending the bombardment of Belgrade. From 8 April to 12 April, Lieutenant Colonel Fortier drove through battle and devastated areas under frequent bombing and aerial machine gun fire, and, in order to enter Hungary traveled on horse, on foot, and on a railroad section handcar through 30 kilometers of the demolished zone. Lieutenant Colonel Fortier combined to a marked degree the qualities of diplomat and soldier and by his initiative and prompt and forceful action successfully accomplished his mission, and his activities are credited by the American Minister with having resulted in causing the terrific bombardment of Belgrade to be suspended.

The Balkans were eventually overrun, and Fortier was ordered back to the United States and to the War Department General Staff as Head of the Western European Division of the G-2.

On 9 December 1941, he was ordered to the newly formed Joint Intelligence Committee (JIC) of the Joint Chiefs of Staff.

From 1942 to 1945, Fortier was a field artillery commander in the 94th Infantry Division. Fortier also briefly became the Commanding General of the entire 94th Infantry Division, during the US occupation of the Düsseldorf area in Germany and the Plzeň area in Czechoslovakia, before being recalled to Washington, D.C.

From 1945 to 1946, Fortier also served as a member of the Military Staff Committee of the United Nations.

Fortier was then appointed by Sidney Souers to become the assistant director and Acting Chief of Operational Services for the Central Intelligence Group (CIG), which was the direct predecessor of the Central Intelligence Agency (CIA).

In this capacity at CIG, and at the direction of the National Intelligence Authority (NIA), Fortier led the Fortier Board (also known as the Fortier Committee or the "Fortier Panel), which was a six-man team responsible for analyzing the legitimacy of a plan presented by John Magruder for and about the future of the Strategic Services Unit (SSU), and whether its duties should mostly be absorbed into the CIG. The findings of the Fortier Board are still largely censored in CIA documents, but the result was that roughly a year later, Magruder's plan was largely implemented by the NIA. The majority of SSU staff were absorbed into the CIG's new Office of Special Operations (OSO), headed by Donald H. Galloway. The OSO would remain designated OSO under Galloway during the creation of the CIA by Congress shortly afterward.

Fortier was one of the founders of the Armed Forces Staff College in Norfolk, Virginia in the immediate postwar period. By 1947, Fortier had taken the position of the Director of the Intelligence Division at the Staff College.

From 1949 to 1950, and the beginning of the Korean War, Fortier was deployed to Japan and Korea, where he served on General Douglas MacArthur's staff as the Director of Theater Intelligence.

Fortier retired as a Brigadier General in 1950.

In his retirement, he was the commander in chief of the Military Order of the World Wars (MOWW) and the president of the District of Columbia chapter of the Sons of the American Revolution. While at MOWW, Fortier lobied on Capitol Hill to help defeat the plan by Robert McNamara to merge the Army Reserves and the National Guard.
