= Ludwell Lee Montague =

American intelligence officer (1907–1972)

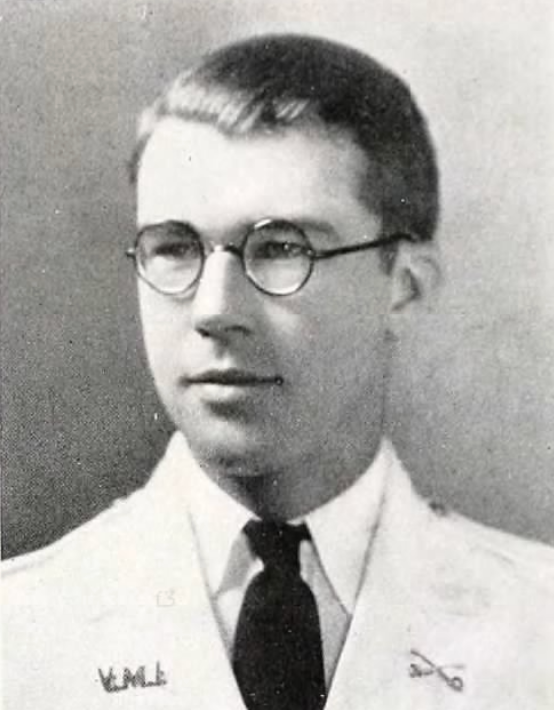

CIG Acting Assistant Director of the Office of Reports and Estimates
- In office 1946–1947
- Appointed by: Sidney Souers
- President: Harry S. Truman

Chief of the Global Survey Group
- In office 1947–1950
- President: Harry S. Truman

CIA Director for the production of National Estimates
- In office 1950–?
- Appointed by: Walter Bedell Smith
- President: Harry Truman; Dwight D. Eisenhower

Personal details
- Born: 8 Aug 1907 Richmond, Virginia
- Died: 29 Feb 1972 (aged 64) Ware Neck, Virginia
- Resting place: Ware Episcopal Church Cemetery
- Education: Virginia Military Institute; Duke University

Military service
- Branch/service: United States Army; Office of the Coordinator of Information; Office of Strategic Services; Central Intelligence Group; Central Intelligence Agency
- Rank: Colonel
- Battles/wars: World War II; Cold War

Ludwell Lee Montague (1907–1972) was the first Chief of Reports and Estimates in the history of the modern United States intelligence community, remaining in this capacity in some form through World War II and into the early Cold War. He was a major architect of the United States intelligence system, being present during the creation of the Office of the Coordinator of Information (COI), and watching William J. Donovan transform it into a worldwide intelligence collection and propaganda agency. He remained in the intelligence community following the dissolution of the Office of Strategic Services (OSS) and the initial postwar period prior to the creation of the Central Intelligence Agency (CIA). In 1946, he was placed by Sidney Souers in the command structure of the Central Intelligence Group (CIG) as the Chief of its Office of Reports and Estimates (ORE) staff. In 1947, with the establishment of the CIA, he was made the first Chief of the CIA's Global Survey Group, in charge of worldwide estimates. In 1950, he was made the chief of National Estimates.

== Life ==
Ludwell Lee Montague was born in Richmond City, Virginia. His father was Major Jeffrey Montague, a retired US Army officer. His mother was Harriotte Lee Taliaferro Montague, who was described as a scion of the Catlett family of Timber Neck and of the Nelson family of Yorktown. The Montague family home, Lowland Cottage in Gloucester County, was one of the few early Colonial houses that was still in use at the time.

Montague graduated from the Virginia Military Institute in 1928, and received his Ph.D. from Duke University in 1935.

He was an assistant professor of history at VMI from 1934 until 1940, when his academic career was interrupted by World War II.

In October 1940, he was ordered to active duty in the Military Intelligence Division at the War Department General staff as a reserve captain.

In 1941, he was selected to be Secretary of the Joint Intelligence Committee (JIC). He served with the JIC throughout the war in various capacities. From September 1943 onward he was the senior Army member of the Joint Intelligence Staff (corresponding to the JIC), with the grade of colonel. For these services he was awarded the Legion of Merit and the Order of the British Empire.

On the establishment of the Central Intelligence Group in 1946, he became Acting Assistant Director for Reports and Estimates. Subsequently he served in various senior positions in ORE.

From 1947 until 1951, Montague was assigned as the CIA representative of the National Security Council staff.

In the autumn of 1950, when Walter Bedell Smith became the Director of Central Intelligence (DCI), Montague was put in charge of the production of national intelligence estimates. For the next two decades, he worked primarily in this capacity.

Montague later wrote an official CIA book about Smith, which was declassified and published decades after Montague died.
