= Edwin Kennedy Wright =

United States Army general

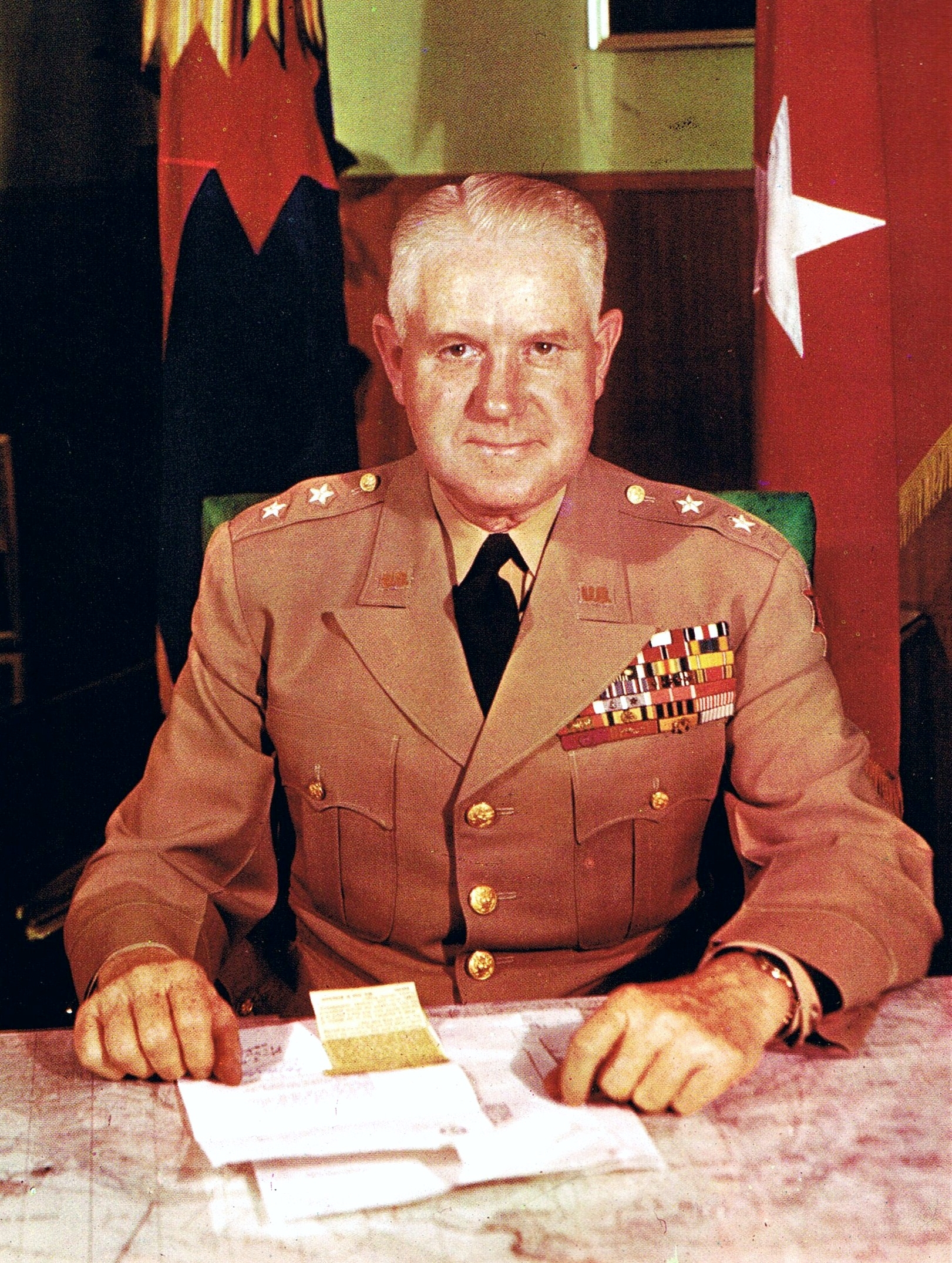
- Wright as a major general

Executive Director of the Central Intelligence Group
- In office January 20, 1946 – 1947

2nd Deputy Director of Central Intelligence
- In office January 20, 1947 – March 9, 1949
- Preceded by: Kingman Douglass
- Succeeded by: William Harding Jackson

Personal details
- Born: December 28, 1898 Portland, Oregon, US
- Died: September 3, 1983 (aged 84)
- Awards: Army Distinguished Service Medal; Silver Star
- Nickname: "Pinky"

Military service
- Allegiance: United States
- Service: United States Army
- Years of service: 1920-1955
- Rank: Major General
- Unit: 12th Army Group; Far East Command
- Commands: Military District of Washington; 6th Infantry Division
- Battles/wars: World War II; Korean War
- Service number: O-015475

Edwin Kennedy Wright, also known as Pinky (December 28, 1898 – September 3, 1983). was a career US Army officer and deputy director of the US Central Intelligence Agency.

== Biography ==
Wright was born on December 28, 1898, in Portland, Oregon. He attended Oregon State College and enlisted in military service in 1920 with the Oregon National Guard. He was commissioned as a second lieutenant in the regular Army on July 3, 1923.

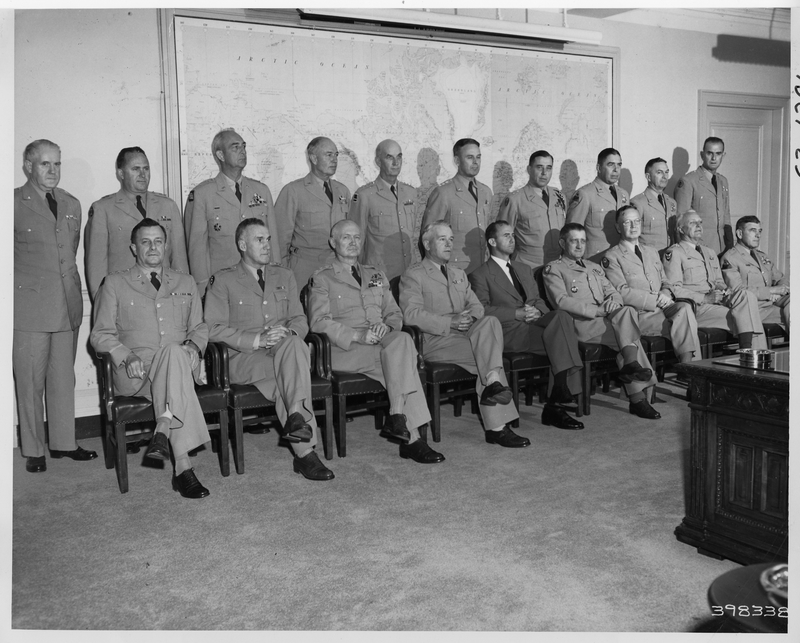
Army commanders in the United States and certain overseas commanders meet with Secretary of the Army Frank Pace and General J. Lawton Collins, Army Chief of Staff, in the Pentagon in routine sessions, June 5, 1952. Major General Edwin K. Wright is stood on the extreme left, next to Major General George Decker (right).

Wright achieved distinction as an Armored Force (tank corps) Instructor and G-3 operations officer. During World War II, he became an intelligence briefing officer on the staff of General Omar N. Bradley at 12th US Army Group in Europe. After the war, Wright became executive director of the Intelligence Division, US Army general staff in the War Department (Feb-Jun 1946) under General George C. Marshall. On Bradley's recommendation, Wright became Deputy G-2 under then Army-Air Forces Major General Hoyt S. Vandenberg (G-2).

President Harry Truman appointed Vandenberg to replace Admiral Sidney Souers as the second Director of Central Intelligence (CIG-CIA) on January 20, 1946. Wright became Vandenberg's Executive to the Director of Central Intelligence Group (CIG) the same date. The National Security Act of 1947, signed into law by Truman, gave legislative authority to the new Central Intelligence Agency (CIA).

Wright was promoted to brigadier general on February 3, 1947, becoming the first deputy director of Central Intelligence (DDCI) (1947-1949), serving under both Vandenberg and his successor (the third DCI) Adm. Roscoe Hillenkoetter. Hillenkoetter and the new defense secretary, James Forrestal, injected DDCI Wright into interagency disputes over which department was to direct 'black activities' under clandestine operations. General Wright insisted that the CIA "was and had to be the sole agency to conduct organized foreign clandestine operations."

In 1949, Wright was assigned to General Douglas MacArthur's G-3 operations staff at headquarters Far East Command (Tokyo). He was promoted to Major General on March 8, 1952, becoming Commander of the US Military District of Washington (1952-1954), then took over as commanding general of the 6th US Army Infantry Division at Fort Ord, California.

Wright retired on September 30, 1955. He was awarded the Silver Star Medal (1950 - for "conspicuous gallantry and intrepidity in action against the enemy in Korea") followed by the Army Distinguished Service Medal (1952).

Wright died on September 3, 1983, at age 85.
