= James S. Lay, Jr. =

American intelligence officer (1911–1987)

James Selden Lay, Jr.
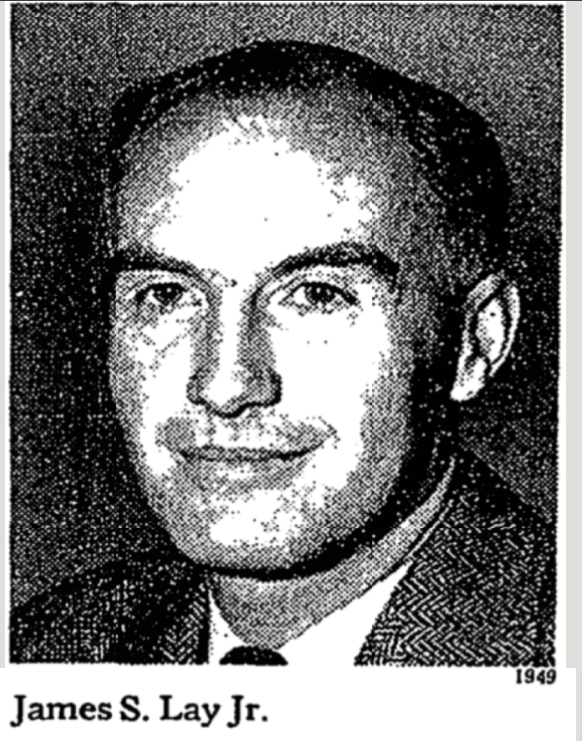

Executive Secretary of the United States Intelligence Board
- In office 1962–1971
- President: John F. Kennedy; Lyndon B. Johnson; Richard Nixon

Deputy Assistant to the Director of Central Intelligence
- In office 1961–1964
- Appointed by: Allen Dulles
- President: John F. Kennedy; Lyndon B. Johnson

Executive Secretary of the National security council
- In office 1950–1961
- President: Harry S. Truman; Dwight D. Eisenhower
- Preceded by: Sidney Souers

Assistant Executive Secretary of the National security council
- In office 1947–1950
- President: Harry S. Truman

Executive Secretary of the Intelligence Advisory Board and the National Intelligence Authority
- In office 1946–1947
- Appointed by: Sidney Souers
- President: Harry S. Truman

Personal details
- Born: 24 Aug 1911 Washington, D.C.
- Died: 28 Jun 1987 (aged 75) Perry Point, Maryland
- Resting place: Arlington National Cemetery
- Education: Virginia Military Institute; Harvard Business School
- Awards: National Civil Service League (NCSL) Career Service Award

Military service
- Allegiance: United States
- Branch/service: United States Army; Central Intelligence Group; Central Intelligence Agency
- Years of service: 1933–1941 (reserve); 1941–1945 (active); 1945–1971 (reserve)
- Rank: Colonel
- Battles/wars: World War II

James Selden Lay, Jr. was a U.S. intelligence officer and one of the early architects of the modern United States Intelligence Community, who played significant roles in various government agencies during his career. He was present for the creations of the Central Intelligence Group (CIG), the Central Intelligence Agency (CIA), and the National Security Council (NSC).

== Life ==
He attended the Virginia Military Institute, where he majored in electrical engineering and graduated second in his class in 1933. He later earned a master’s degree from Harvard Business School in 1935. Lay worked for multiple utility companies, beginning with the Virginia Electric & Power Company in Richmond, where he spent seven months as a commercial and industrial power sales engineer.

Following college, he served as an officer in the Field Artillery Reserve, and was then called to active duty in the United States Army in May 1941.

After training at Camp Livingston, Louisiana, with the 353rd Field Artillery Regiment, he was assigned to the British Empire Branch of the Military Intelligence Service within the War Department in Washington, D.C. He later spent several months in London working in the office of the U.S. military attaché before returning to Washington to serve as secretary to the Joint Intelligence Committee of the Joint Chiefs of Staff.

After the war, Lay transitioned to the State Department as a management analyst, working under the special assistant responsible for research and intelligence. He worked at the State Department for two months, before being selected for a new assignment.

In 1946, Lay was selected by Admiral Sidney Souers to become the Secretary of the Intelligence Advisory Board (IAB) within the Central Intelligence Group (CIG) during its brief existence. In this capacity, he was responsible for coordinating meetings and facilitating communication among the board members, who were the intelligence chiefs of the Departments of State, War, Navy, and the Air Force. The IAB played a crucial role in advising the Director of Central Intelligence (DCI) on matters of national intelligence.

Lay was also selected by Souers to become Executive Secretary of the National Intelligence Authority (NIA).

Lay's role as Executive Secretary involved organizing agendas, documenting discussions, and ensuring that directives and decisions were effectively communicated and implemented across the various intelligence agencies. His efforts contributed to the foundational coordination and integration of U.S. intelligence activities during the immediate post-World War II period.

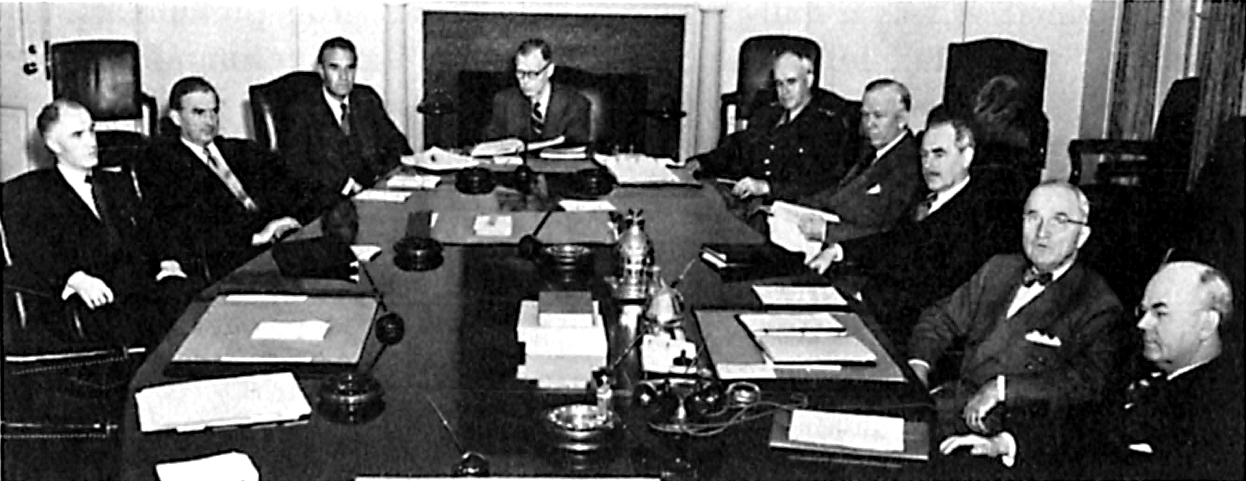
Meeting of the National Security Council, January 25, 1951Left to right: James S. Lay, Jr., W. Stuart Symington, W. Averell Harriman, Gen. Walter Bedell Smith, Gen. Omar N. Bradley, George C. Marshall, Dean G. Acheson, President Truman, John W. Snyder.

The National Security Act of 1947 changed the structure of the intelligence community. Following the transition of the Central Intelligence Group into the Central Intelligence Agency (CIA), and the transition of the NIA into the National Security Council (NSC), Lay became the Assistant Executive Secretary of the NSC, with Souers becoming its Executive Secretary.

In 1950, with Souers announcing his retirement, Lay became the Executive Secretary of the NSC, where he was instrumental in shaping national security policies during the early years of the Cold War. In this job, he was responsible for coordinating national security policies and decisions. His duties as the Executive Secretary also involved his being primarily responsible for the permanent staff of the NSC. A portrait of him in this capacity is archived at the Harry S. Truman Library.

However, in The Journal of American History, Anna Kasten Nelson wrote that Lay did little to soothe the tensions that had formed at the NSC between Louis A. Johnson and Dean Acheson, who were at loggerheads over intelligence policy. Nelson wrote:

"Johnson's dislike of Acheson was so great that relations between the two departments hardly extended beyond the most basic liaison. The two secretaries rarely exchanged a word. Unfortunately, as the relationship between Johnson and Acheson disintegrated, the process was further weakened by the departure of Souers in January 1950. James S. Lay, Jr., who replaced him as executive secretary, was a competent director of the secretariat's functions but regarded himself as a servant of the NSC rather than as a staff assistant to the president. He was either unwilling or unable to assume the tasks of coordinating information and smoothing relationships that were performed by Souers. The situation was further complicated by the fact that Souers remained as a consultant to the president. His services were intermittent in that role, but his presence precluded anyone else from stepping into the vacuum."

In 1961, Lay transferred to the CIA as Deputy Assistant to the Director of Central Intelligence (DADCI). At this time, the DCI was Allen Dulles.

In 1964, while Lay was serving on the United States Intelligence Board, he was awarded the National Civil Service League (NCSL) Career Service Award.

In 1971, Lay officially retired, but continued to work as a consultant to the President's Intelligence Advisory Board until 1977.

Lay died in 1987, in the Veterans Administration hospital in Perry Point, Maryland, from Alzheimer's disease.
