= Roscoe H. Hillenkoetter =

American admiral (1897–1982)

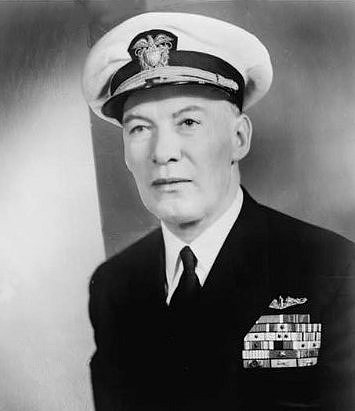
- Hillenkoetter in 1957

3rd Director of Central Intelligence
- In office May 1, 1947 – October 7, 1950
- President: Harry Truman
- Deputy: Edwin K. Wright
- Preceded by: Hoyt Vandenberg
- Succeeded by: Walter B. Smith

Personal details
- Born: Roscoe Henry Hillenkoetter; May 8, 1897 St. Louis, Missouri, U.S.
- Died: June 18, 1982 (aged 85) New York City, U.S.]
- Resting place: Arlington National Cemetery
- Spouse: Jane Clark
- Education: United States Naval Academy (BS)

Military service
- Allegiance: United States
- Branch/service: United States Navy
- Years of service: 1915–1957
- Rank: Vice Admiral
- Commands: Commanding Officer, USS Missouri; Commander, 1st Cruiser Division; Commander, 3rd Naval District
- Battles/wars: World War I World War II; Korean War

Roscoe Henry Hillenkoetter (May 8, 1897 – June 18, 1982) was the third director of the post–World War II United States Central Intelligence Group (CIG), the third Director of Central Intelligence (DCI), and the first director of the Central Intelligence Agency created by the National Security Act of 1947. He served as DCI and director of the CIG and the CIA from May 1, 1947, to October 7, 1950, and, after his retirement from the United States Navy, was a member of the board of governors of National Investigations Committee On Aerial Phenomena (NICAP) from 1957 to 1962.

== Education and military career ==
Hillenkoetter graduated from the United States Naval Academy at Annapolis, Maryland, in 1919. He served with the Atlantic Fleet during World War I and joined the Office of Naval Intelligence in 1933. He served several tours in naval intelligence, including as assistant naval attaché to France, Spain, and Portugal. During the Spanish Civil War, he coordinated the evacuation of Americans from the country. After the German invasion of France, Hillenkoetter entered Vichy France and aided the underground movement. As executive officer of the USS West Virginia (BB-48), he was wounded during the attack on Pearl Harbor, and afterwards was officer in charge of intelligence on Chester W. Nimitz's Pacific Fleet staff until 1943. He briefly served as commander of the destroyer tender USS Dixie before joining the Bureau of Naval Personnel in 1944.

After the war, then-Captain Hillenkoetter commanded the USS Missouri in 1946 before returning to his pre-war posting as naval attaché in Paris before becoming head of the Central Intelligence Group (CIG) in May 1947.

== Director of Central Intelligence ==
President Truman persuaded a reluctant Hillenkoetter, then a rear admiral, to become Director of Central Intelligence (DCI), and run the Central Intelligence Group (September 1947). Under the National Security Act of 1947 he was nominated and confirmed by the U.S. Senate as DCI, now in charge of the newly established Central Intelligence Agency (December 1947). At first, the U.S. State Department directed the new CIA's covert operations component, and George F. Kennan chose Frank Wisner to be its director. Hillenkoetter expressed doubt that the same agency could be effective at both covert action and intelligence analysis.

As DCI, Hillenkoetter was periodically called to testify before Congress. One instance concerned the CIA's first major Soviet intelligence failure, the failure to predict the Soviet atomic bomb test (August 29, 1949). In the weeks following the test, but prior to the CIA's detection of it, Hillenkoetter released the September 20, 1949 National Intelligence Estimate (NIE) stating, "the earliest possible date by which the USSR might be expected to produce an atomic bomb is mid-1950 and the most probable date is mid-1953." Hillenkoetter was called before the Joint Committee on Atomic Energy (JCAE) to explain how the CIA not only failed to predict the test, but also how they did not even detect it after it occurred. JCAE members were steaming that the CIA could be taken by such surprise. Hillenkoetter imprecisely replied that the CIA knew it would take the Soviets approximately five years to build the bomb, but the CIA misjudged when they started:

We knew that they were working on it, and we started here, and this organization [CIA] was set up after the war and we started in the middle and we didn't know when they had started and it had to be picked up from what we could get along there. That is what I say: this thing of getting a fact that you definitely have on the exploding of this bomb has helped us in going back and looking over what we had before, and it will help us in what we get in the future. But you picked up in the mid-air on the thing, and we didn't know when they started, sir.

The JCAE was not satisfied with Hillenkoetter's answer, and his and the CIA's reputation suffered among government heads in Washington, even though the press did not write about the CIA's first Soviet intelligence failure.

The U.S. government had no intelligence warning of North Korea's invasion (June 25, 1950) of South Korea. DCI Hillenkoetter convened an ad hoc group to prepare estimates of likely communist behavior on the Korean peninsula; it worked well enough that his successor institutionalized it.

Two days prior to North Korea's invasion of South Korea, Hillenkoetter went before Congress (the House Foreign Affairs Committee) and testified that the CIA had good sources in Korea, implying that the CIA would be able to provide warning before any invasion. Following the invasion, the press suspected the administration was surprised by it, and wondered whether Hillenkoetter would be removed. The DCI was not influential with President Harry S. Truman, but Hillenkoetter insisted to the President that as the Director of Central Intelligence, it would be politically advantageous to testify before Congress to try to remedy the situation. After the testimony, some Senators told the Washington Post that Hillenkoetter confused them when explaining the CIA did not predict when North Korea would invade by saying it was not the CIA's job to analyze intelligence, just to pass it on to high-ranking policymakers. Even though most senators believed Hillenkoetter ably explained the CIA's performance, many at the CIA were embarrassed by the news reports, and by mid-August the rumors of Hillenkoetter's removal were confirmed when President Truman announced that General Walter Bedell "Beetle" Smith would replace him as DCI.

President Truman installed a new DCI in October. Nebraska Congressman Howard Buffett alleged that Hillenkoetter's classified testimony before the Senate Armed Services Committee "established American responsibility for the Korean outbreak," and sought to have it declassified until his death in 1964.

== Resumption of active military duty ==
Admiral Hillenkoetter returned to the fleet, commanding Cruiser Division 1 of the Cruiser-Destroyer Force, Pacific Fleet from October 1950 to August 1951 during the Korean War. He then commanded the Third Naval District with headquarters in New York City from July 1952 to August 1956 and was promoted to the rank of vice admiral on 9 April 1956.

His last assignment was as Inspector General of the Navy from 1 August 1956 until his retirement from the Navy on 1 May 1957.

== Board member of NICAP ==
The National Investigations Committee On Aerial Phenomena was formed in 1956, with the organization's corporate charter being approved October 24. Hillenkoetter was on NICAP's board of governors from about 1957 until 1962. Donald E. Keyhoe, NICAP director and Hillenkoetter's Naval Academy classmate, wrote that Hillenkoetter wanted public disclosure of UFO evidence. Perhaps Hillenkoetter's best-known statement on the subject was in 1960 in a letter to Congress, as reported in The New York Times: "Behind the scenes, high-ranking Air Force officers are soberly concerned about UFOs. But through official secrecy and ridicule, many citizens are led to believe the unknown flying objects are nonsense."

== Death ==
Hillenkoetter lived in Weehawken, New Jersey, following his retirement from the Navy, until his death on June 18, 1982, at New York City's Mount Sinai Hospital.

== In fiction ==
Actor Leon Russom portrayed Hillenkoetter in an episode of Dark Skies, a 1996 television series presenting a story based conspiracies related to UFOs.

== Awards ==

Submarine Warfare insignia
Navy Distinguished Service Medal
Legion of Merit	Bronze Star Medal	Purple Heart
World War I Victory Medal w/ Clasp	Second Nicaraguan Campaign Medal	American Defense Service Medal w/ Fleet Clasp
American Campaign Medal	Asiatic-Pacific Campaign Medal w/ with two service stars	World War II Victory Medal
Navy Occupation Service Medal	National Defense Service Medal	Korean Service Medal with two service stars
United Nations Korea Medal	Nicaraguan Presidential Medal of Merit	Knight of the Order of Maritime Merit (France)
Officer of the Legion of Honor (France)	Commander of the Order of the Phoenix (Greece)	Commander of the Order of Saints Maurice and Lazarus (Italy)

== Dates of rank ==
Ensign	Lieutenant junior grade	Lieutenant	Lieutenant commander
O-1	O-2	O-3	O-4
7 June 1919	7 June 1922	7 June 1925	30 June 1934

Commander	Captain	Rear admiral	Vice admiral
O-5	O-6	O-7, O-8	O-9
1 July 1939	18 June 1942	29 November 1946	9 April 1956

Military offices
Preceded by Stuart S. Murray	Commanding Officer of the USS Missouri; 1945–1946	Succeeded by Tom B. Hill
Preceded by Walter S. DeLany	Commander of the 3rd Naval District; 1952–1956	Succeeded by Milton E. Miles
Government offices
Preceded by Hoyt Vandenberg	Director of Central Intelligence; 1947–1950	Succeeded by Walter B. Smith
