= William B. Goggins =

American Navy officer (1896–1985)

William Bernard Goggins
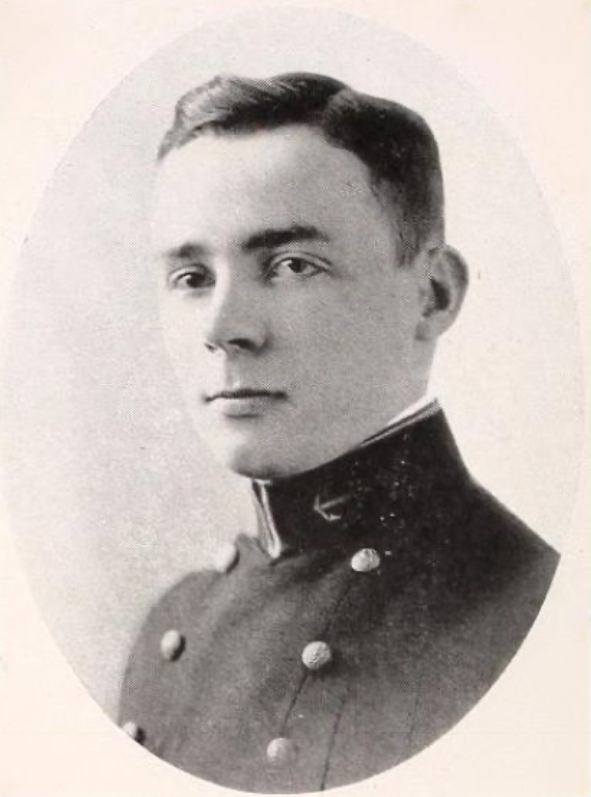
- Goggins' portrait for the United States Naval Academy, 1920
- Born: William Bernard Goggins; September 10, 1898
- Died: December 27, 1985 (aged 87)
- Education: Yale University
- Military career
- Branch: Navy
- Rank: Rear admiral
- Conflicts: World War I; World War II; Battle of Makassar Strait; Battle of Okinawa
- Awards: Legion of Merit (2); Purple Heart; Navy Unit Commendation; Combat Action Ribbon; Navy Occupation Service Medal; Navy and Marine Corps Commendation Medal; Philippine Liberation Medal; Philippine Defense Medal; World War II Victory Medal; Asiatic–Pacific Campaign Medal; American Campaign Medal; American Defense Service Medal; World War I Victory Medal

William Bernard Goggins (September 10, 1898 – December 27, 1985) was an American Navy officer.

== Biography ==
Born September 10, 1898, to William Goggins and Midge May Goggins (née McCarter), Goggins graduated from Yale University with a master's degree in electrical engineering. He graduated from the United States Naval Academy in 1920. He served on battleships during World War I. During World War II, he served as executive officer on USS Marblehead in the Java Sea. The ship was damaged during the Battle of Makassar Strait, and Goggins was severely burned.

Goggins worked as head of Station HYPO in the United States Pacific Fleet headquarters from October 1942 until assuming command of USS Alabama on January 18, 1945, later fighting in the Battle of Okinawa.

After the war, Goggins was selected by Admiral Sidney Souers to be the Chief of the Central Planning Staff for the Central Intelligence Group (CIG), and also served as the commanding officer of the CIG's Naval Administrative Command in coordination with the Office of Naval Intelligence (ONI). He also did not always see eye-to-eye with his colleagues at CIG, and went at loggerheads over certain aspects of planning the structure of Central Intelligence, as the council would often overrule the Planning Staff and go with their own plans, as Arthur B. Darling wrote of Goggins relationship with the Group:

"One should not blame Goggins; it was not pleasant to have the plans of his office thwarted by another body within the Group. But like the case of the Central Reports Staff, in which the Council had also over-ruled Captain Goggins, the episode revealed the usefulness of a separate body of deliberation, to review the enterprises of the central intelligence organization and to see that they were more cooperative than competitive."

Goggins witnessed the CIG become the Central Intelligence Agency (CIA) in 1947.

Later, he worked as a chief of staff in the maintenance of the Panama Canal in the Panama Canal Zone. He retired from the military in 1949, at the rank of rear admiral.

After retiring, Goggins was a researcher for Johns Hopkins University. He founded the General Kinetics Institute, a computing and telecommunications company. From 1949, he lived in Washington, D.C. He died on December 27, 1985, at Inova Fairfax Hospital, aged 87.
