= Sheffield Edwards =

First director of security for the CIA

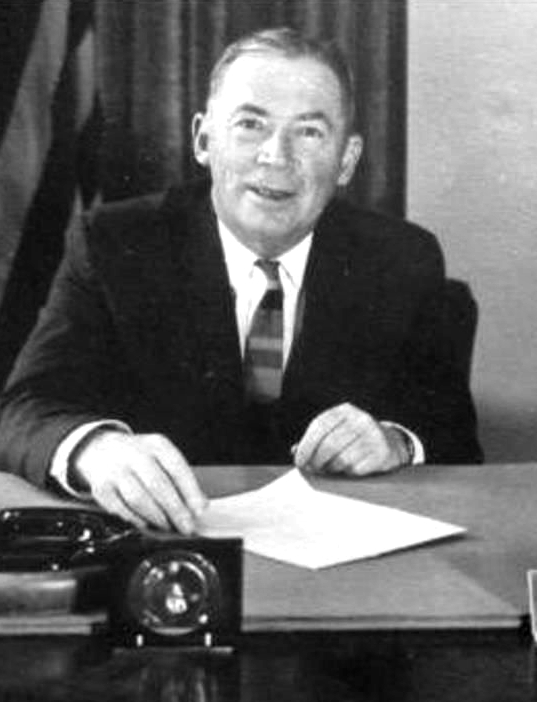

Assistant Executive Director of the Central Intelligence Group
- In office 1946 – Disestablishment of CIG

1st Chief of Inspection and Security at the Central Intelligence Agency
- In office Establishment of CIA – 1963
- Appointed by: Hoyt Vandenberg
- Succeeded by: Howard J. Osborn

Personal details
- Born: 12 June 1902 San Francisco
- Died: 15 July 1975 (aged 73) Leesburg, Virginia
- Awards: Bronze Star Medal; Legion of Merit; Distinguished Intelligence Medal

Military service
- Branch/service: United States Army Air Forces; 1st British Corps; United States Army
- Years of service: 1923–1946
- Rank: Colonel
- Battles/wars: World War II; Cold War

Sheffield "Shef" Edwards was the first director of the Office of Security at the Central Intelligence Agency (CIA), and the principal architect of security programs at the agency. Edwards was directly involved in several assassination attempts against Fidel Castro. He was also one of the grand designers of Project BLUEBIRD.

== Life ==
Edwards was born 12 June 1902, in San Francisco.

In 1923, Edwards graduated from the United States Military Academy at West Point.

During World War II, Edwards worked for the United States Army Air Forces, as chief of staff of the 8th Air Support Command, transferred to become the chief of staff for the 9th Fighter Command, and later the Executive Officer of the Command Air Section of the I British Corps.

It should also be noted that Edwards was the principal architect of the 9th Fighter Command in 1943, an act which earned him the Bronze Star Medal.

Later during the war, Edwards was transferred a command position in the G3 Headquarters of the 12th Army Group.

After the war, Edwards joined the Central Intelligence Group (CIG). When the CIG was merged into the CIA with the passage of the National Security Act of 1947, Edwards became the CIA's first director of security under Hoyt Vandenberg, managing the Office of Security. Edwards worked in this role from the establishment of the CIA, until his retirement in 1963.

During Senate investigations into the operations of the CIA, Edwards was revealed to be one of two men who planned several failed assassination attempts of Fidel Castro, the other man being Richard Bissell. During Phase I of that operation, which called to use the Mafia to smuggle Botulinum toxin in pill form into Cuba, and feed them to Castro. Edwards infamously tested the pills on some Guinea pigs to see if they worked. Edwards and Bissell also devised other ways to assassinate Castro, all of which failed.

Edwards and William King Harvey hired Sam Giancana and John Roselli for a contract hit on Castro, but the CIA soon learned that the two men were being investigated by the office of Robert F. Kennedy. Kennedy, when informed by the CIA, said: "The next time you deal with the Mafia, come to me first."

Under Edwards, the Office of Security also engaged in mole hunts to find traitors and suspected Communists. Allen Dulles and Lawrence R. Houston, while publicly denying Senator Joseph McCarthy any access to CIA employees, also tasked Edwards with the responsibility of investigating the names that McCarthy had demanded access to.

From 1963 to 1970, Edwards was the President of "Sheffield Edwards Security and Management Consultants," in Washington, D.C..
