= William Wilson Quinn =

United States Army general (1907–2000)

William W. Quinn
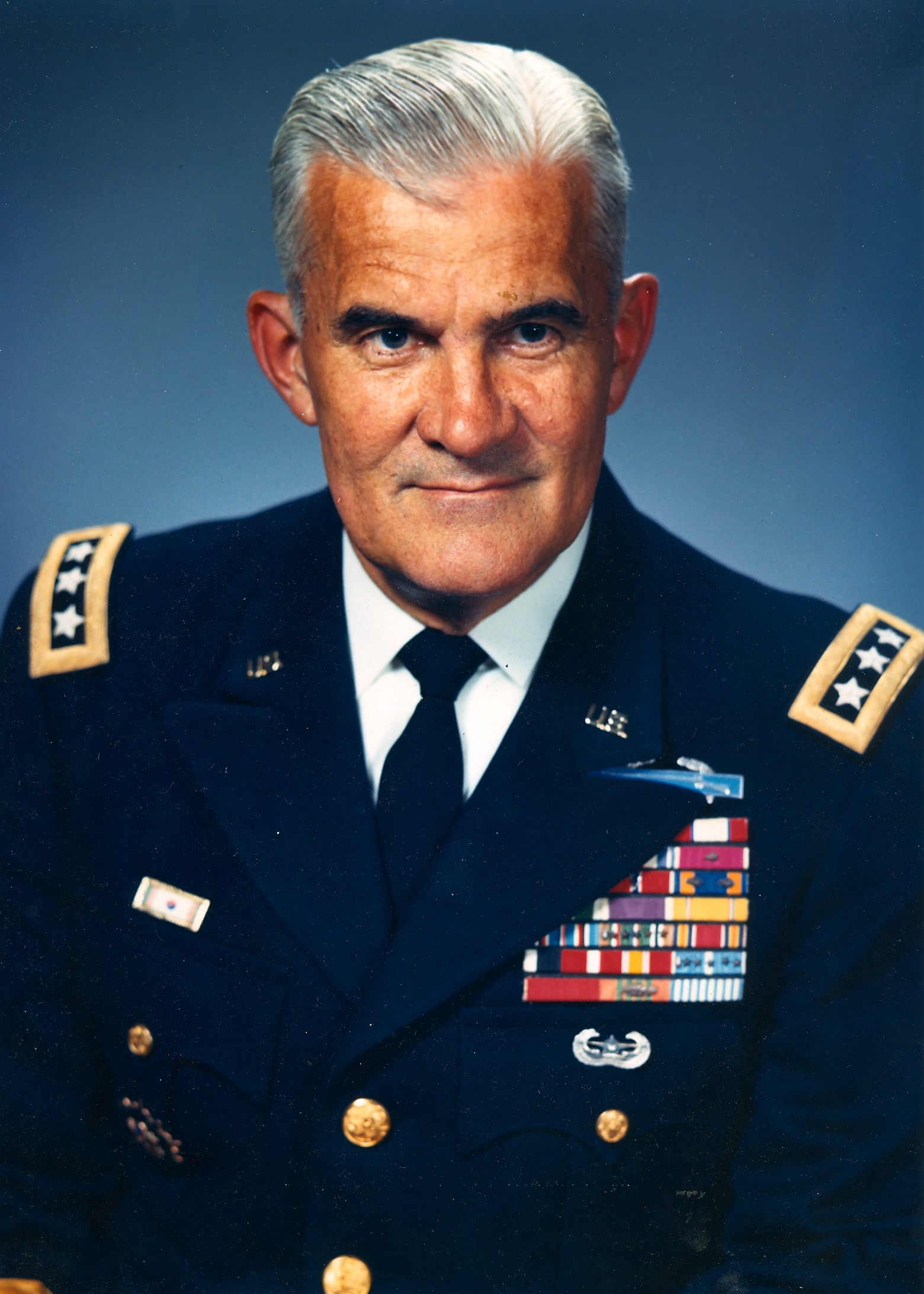
- William Wilson Quinn (circa 1961–1966)

2nd Director of the Strategic Services Unit
- In office April 3, 1946 – July 1, 1946
- President: Harry Truman
- Preceded by: John Magruder
- Succeeded by: Donald H. Galloway

Personal details
- Born: November 1, 1907 Crisfield, Maryland, U.S.
- Died: September 11, 2000 (aged 92) Washington, D.C., U.S.
- Resting place: Arlington National Cemetery
- Spouse: Sara Bette Williams
- Children: 3, including Sally
- Education: St. John's College, Maryland; United States Military Academy (BS)
- Nickname: "Buffalo Bill"

Military service
- Allegiance: United States
- Branch/service: United States Army
- Years of service: 1933–1966
- Rank: Lieutenant General
- Unit: United States Army Europe; 17th Infantry Regiment
- Commands: 34th Infantry Regiment; 17th Infantry Regiment; 7th Army
- Battles/wars: World War II; Operation Dragoon; Siegfried Line Campaign; Operation Nordwind; Korean War; Battle of Inchon; Vietnam War
- Awards: Army Distinguished Service Medal; Silver Star; Legion of Merit; Bronze Star Medal; Purple Heart; Legion of Honour (France); Croix de guerre (France); Order of St. George (Russia); Gallantry Cross (Vietnam)

William Wilson "Buffalo Bill" Quinn (November 1, 1907 – September 11, 2000) was a United States Army officer, who served in intelligence during World War II. Born in Crisfield, Somerset, Maryland and a 1933 graduate of West Point, Quinn retired as a lieutenant general on March 1, 1966 as the commanding general of the Seventh United States Army. He died in Washington, DC at Walter Reed Army Hospital at 92 years old.

== Education ==
Quinn graduated from Crisfield High School with the class of 1925 and then from United States Military Academy class of 1933, and in 1938 attended United States Army Infantry School. In 1942 he graduated from Command and General Staff College. In August 1947 he graduated from the National War College.

== Commands held ==
From 1933–1935 at Fort McKinley Quinn was the commanding officer of Company L, 5th Infantry Regiment. 1935–1936 General Quinn was assigned to Company D and then from 1936–1938 assigned to the Headquarters Company of the 31st Infantry Regiment. In 1940 he was the Command of Headquarters Company of the 4th Infantry Division, and the Commanding Officers of Company D, 8th Infantry Division. In July 1942 he became the Chief of Staff of the G-2, IV Army Corps. In 1949 Quinn was the Commanding Officer of the 3rd Battalion, 34th Infantry Regiment. In April 1949 he became Chief of the Training Sub-section, I Corps. In January 1950 he became the Assistant Chief of Staff of the G-3, I Corps from February to March. In January 1951, Quinn was the Commanding Officer of the 17th Infantry Regiment, 7th Infantry Division in Korea. In 1952 Quinn became the Deputy Chief of Staff of the Pentagon and Deputy Chief of Staff for Planning Coordination of the Office of Chief of Staff, and then eventually became the Chief of Staff of the Pentagon. In 1953 Quinn was transferred to Greece and to be the Head of the Army Section, Joint Military Aid Group to Greece.

In January 1957 he was the Commanding Officer of the 4th Infantry Division of the Strategic Army Corps at Fort Lewis. In July 1958 he became the Deputy Chief of Staff for the G-2 Intelligence of the United States Army. From 1959–1961, Quinn served as the Army's Chief of Information, and in 1959 he became the Chief of Public Information of the Department of the Army. In 1961 Quinn became the Deputy Director of the Defense Intelligence Agency and promoted to lieutenant general.

From 1964–1966, Quinn was the Commanding General of the Seventh United States Army, commonly referred to as 7th Army, in Stuttgart-Vaihingen, Germany.

On March 1, 1966 Quinn retired and became Honorary Colonel of the 17th Infantry, nicknamed "The Buffalos".

Following his retirement from the Army, he served as chief of operations of the Central Intelligence Agency.

== World War II ==
Quinn participated in Operation Dragoon and on January 1, 1945 he was part of Operation Northwind.

On 29 April 1945, Quinn, Acting Chief of Staff of the G-2, IV Army Corps received word that Dachau had been liberated and the camp was under the control of the "International Prisoners Committee", and early the next morning he entered Dachau, through the main gate, with his officers in the 7th Army, a representative from the Office of Strategic Services and a group from his counter-intelligence corps division which was operating under his jurisdiction as G-2 of the 7th Army. He then commissioned each of those three divisions to separately prepare reports: "one was to take the camp; the other was to take the townspeople; the other was to take the organization and what happened and then to interrogate the internees", published as the Dachau report.

"When I read the three reports, I decided it was too big and I didn't have the time to put it all together so I decided to let each one of them tell their own story in their own way and I would do an introduction...The composition was the work of Major Al House, who just died not too long ago. He designed the cover, his concept of the SS. He did the artwork in the "townspeople" area of the German with the pipe and those drawings. The artwork was also done by John Denny and the copy preparation by Charles Denny. The photographs were the 163rd Signal Photo Company and the printing done by the 649th Engineer Compo. Battalion. This was done in the 7th Army, with government funds, so it’s a free document and there is no copyright to it and anybody can reproduce it at their will...I published this in early June, or maybe late May...I issued this to the troops...the press got copies of it, because it was in the Press Room...I sent copies also to the other G-2's who had the same kind of thing in Auschwitz" - William Wilson Quinn

"'the atrocities […] were just too horrible to describe."

== Korea ==
Quinn was in Korea from 1951 to 1952 and in August 1951 Quinn was wounded in Korea. While in Korea he was awarded the Silver Star, Legion of Merit and the Bronze Star with the "V" Device. He was also in the Battle of Inchon. While he was in Korea he was the commanding Officer of the 17th Infantry Regiment which was part of the 7th Infantry Division (the 17th Infantry was, and still is, nicknamed "the Buffalos").

== Occupations ==
He was Vice President of the Aerospace Group program at Martin Marietta Corporation until 1972; and then afterwards he established Quinn Associates, a consulting firm.

In 1991, General Quinn published his 486-page book, Buffalo Bill Remembers: Truth and Courage, detailing his time as a soldier during World War II and the Korean Conflict.

== Awards and decorations ==
Combat Infantryman Badge
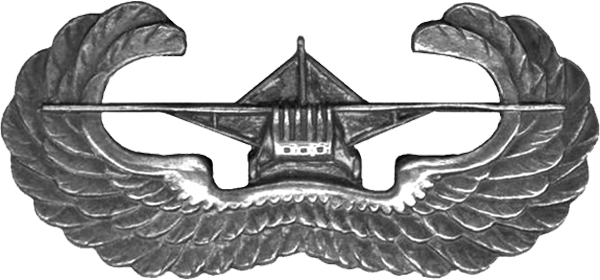
Glider Badge
Army Staff Identification Badge

| Army Distinguished Service Medal |
| Silver Star |
| Legion of Merit with oak leaf cluster |
| Bronze Star with V Device and oak leaf cluster |
| Purple Heart |
| Air Medal with 2 oak leaf clusters |
| Army Commendation Medal with 2 oak leaf clusters |
| American Defense Medal |
| American Campaign Medal |
| European-African-Middle Eastern Campaign Medal with arrowhead and 5 campaign stars |
| World War II Victory Medal |
| Army of Occupation Medal |
| National Defense Service Medal (Korea) |
| Korean Service Medal with arrowhead and 5 campaign stars |
| Vietnam Service Medal |
| Order of the Legion of Honor, class of Officer (France) |
| Order of St. George (Third Class) (Russia) |
| Croix de Guerre (France) |
| Gallantry Cross with palm (Republic of Vietnam) |
| Republic of Korea Presidential Unit Citation |
| United Nations Korea Medal |
| Vietnam Campaign Medal |

== Personal ==
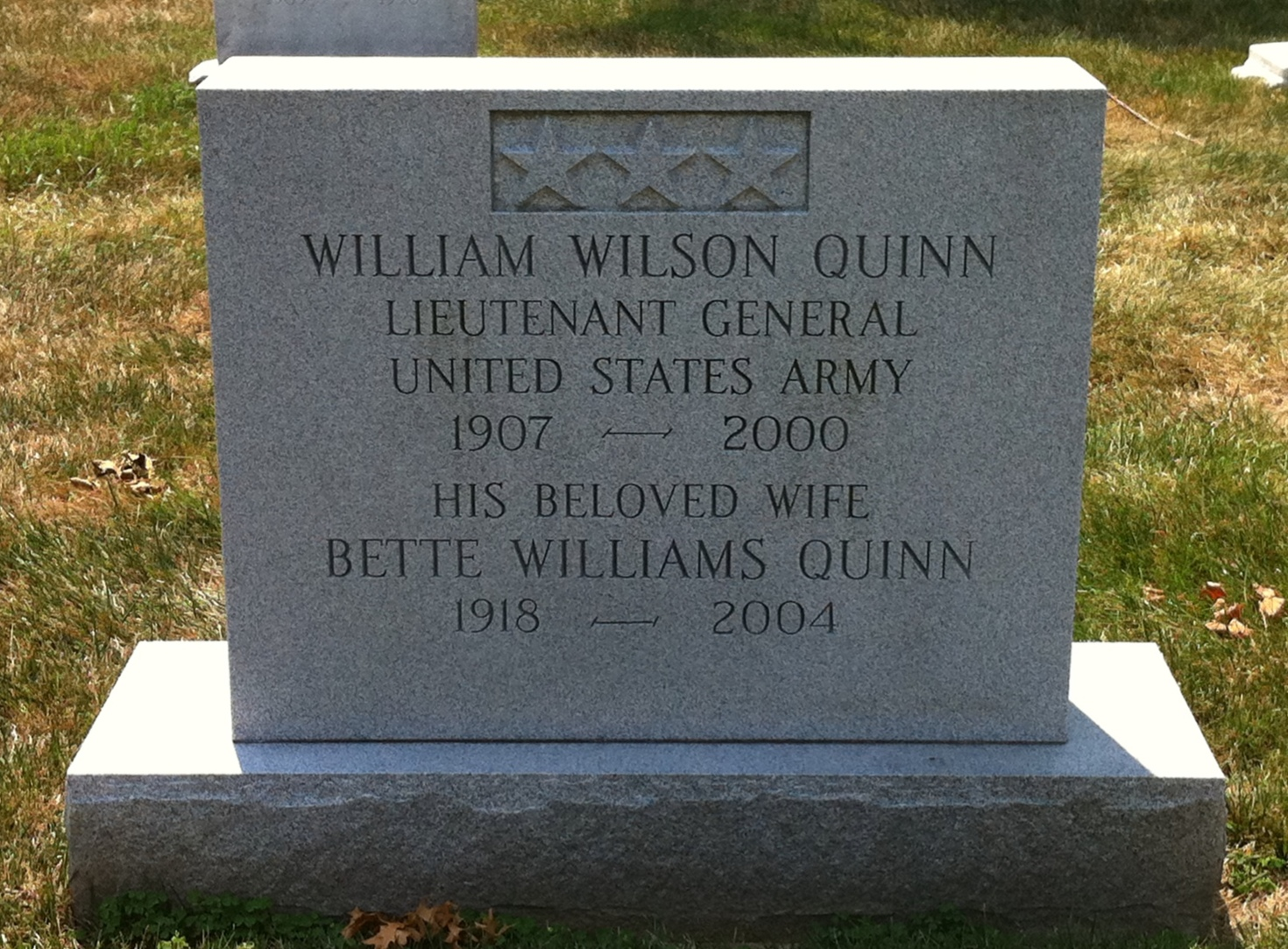
Grave at Arlington National Cemetery

Quinn was married to Sara Bette (née Williams), who is buried next to him at Arlington National Cemetery. Together they had three children: Donna, William W. Jr., and Sally Quinn.

He died in Washington, DC at Walter Reed Army Hospital at 92 years old.

Government offices
| Preceded by John Magruder | Director of the Strategic Services Unit; 1946–1947 | Donald Henry Galloway |
