= Strategic Services Unit =

US Intelligence Agency in the 1940s

Agency overview
- Formed: October 1, 1945
- Preceding agency: Office of Strategic Services
- Dissolved: October 19, 1946
- Superseding agencies: Central Intelligence Agency; Central Intelligence Group
- Agency executives: John L. Magruder (1945–1946); William Wilson Quinn (1946); Donald Henry Galloway (1946)

Overview: Office of Strategic Services
CIA film describing OSS recruitment, training, and missions during WWII

The Strategic Services Unit was an intelligence agency of the United States government that existed in the immediate post–World War II period. It was created from the Secret Intelligence and Counter-Espionage branches of the wartime Office of Strategic Services (OSS).

Assistant Secretary of War John J. McCloy was instrumental in preserving and maintaining the two branches of the OSS with a view to forming a permanent peace-time intelligence agency. The unit was established on October 1, 1945, through Executive Order 9621, which simultaneously abolished the OSS. The SSU was headed by Brigadier General John L. Magruder.

In January 1946, a new National Intelligence Authority (NIA) was established along with a small Central Intelligence Group (CIG).

On April 2, 1946, the Strategic Services Unit was transferred to the new group as the Office of Special Operations (OSO) and a transfer of personnel began immediately.

On October 19, 1946 the Strategic Services Unit was Dissolved and all its personnel and functions were moved to the Office of Special Operations (OSO).

In 1947, the Central Intelligence Agency was established under the 1947 National Security Act, incorporating the Central Intelligence Group. In August 1952, the Office of Special Operations was combined with the Office of Policy Coordination to form the Directorate of Plans.
