= Kingman Douglass =

American investment banker, deputy director of the CIA

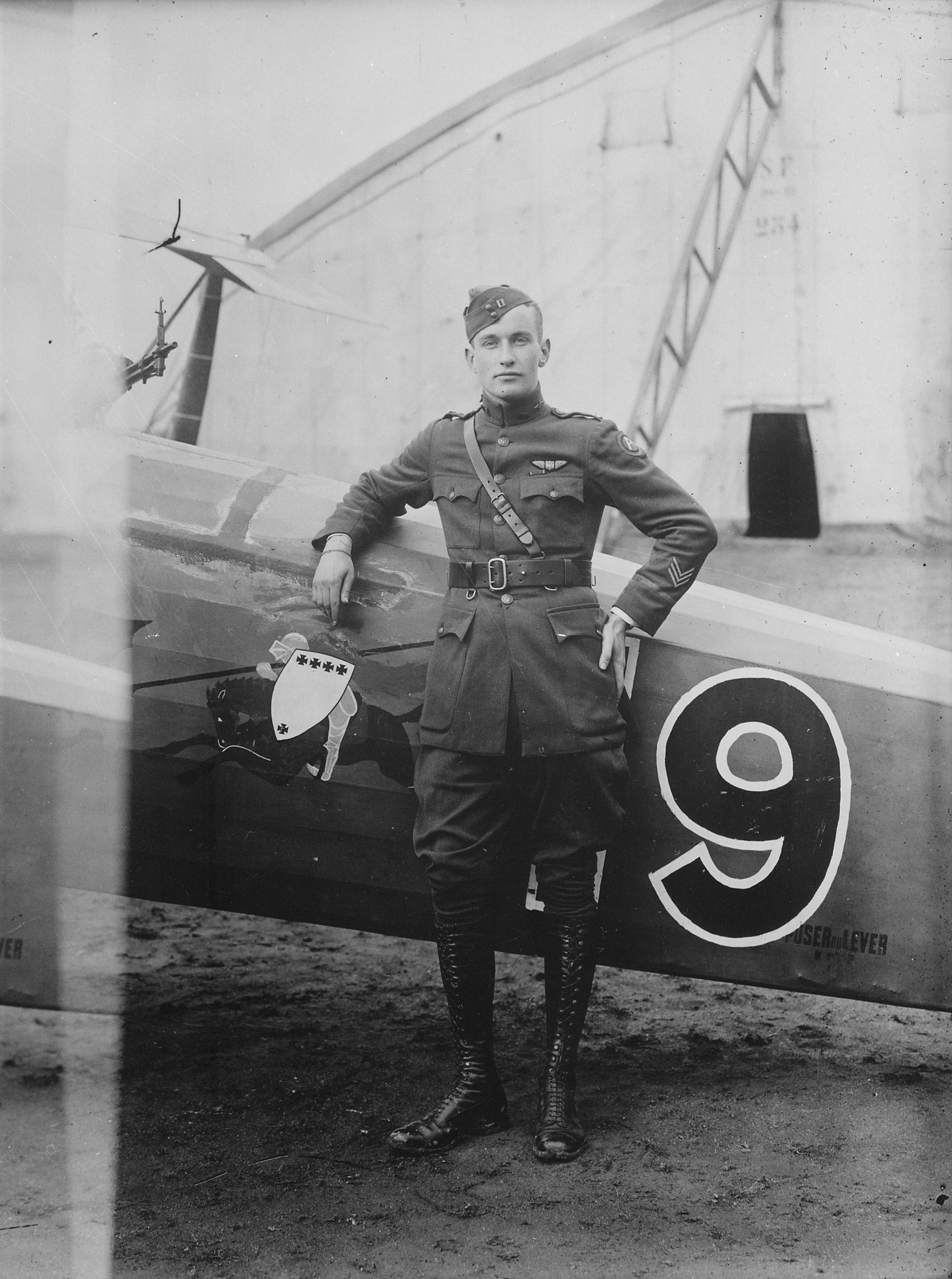
- Douglass in March 1918

Acting Assistant Director of Central Intelligence Group and Deputy Director of Central Intelligence
- In office March 2, 1946 – July 11, 1946
- President: Harry S. Truman
- Preceded by: Position established
- Succeeded by: Edwin Kennedy Wright (1947)

Personal details
- Born: April 16, 1896 Oak Park, Illinois, U.S.
- Died: October 8, 1971 (aged 75) New York City, U.S.
- Spouses: Helen Field James (divorced) Adele Astaire (m. 1947)
- Education: Yale University
- Occupation: Banker

Military service
- Allegiance: United States
- Branch/service: United States Army
- Years of service: 1917-18; 1941-45
- Rank: Colonel
- Unit: 91st Aero Squadron; Eighth Air Force
- Battles/wars: World War I World War II
- Awards: Distinguished Service Cross

Kingman Douglass (April 16, 1896 – October 8, 1971) was an American investment banker and a leading member of the United States intelligence community. He was a deputy director of Central Intelligence from March 1946 to July 1946.

Douglass was born April 16, 1896, in Oak Park, Illinois, the son of William Angus Douglass and Eliza Kingman. He was educated at The Hill School in Pottstown, Pennsylvania (class of 1914) and Yale University (class of 1918).

During World War I, Douglass served as a captain and pilot with the 91st Aero Squadron, the "Demon Chasers," engaged in aerial observation and photographic intelligence. Credited with three aerial victories, he was awarded the Distinguished Service Cross (United States) and commended for bravery in action.

On December 16, 1922, Douglass married Helen Field James, the daughter of Howard James and Sophie Ayers. The couple had three sons: Abner Kingman Douglass, Howard James Douglass and William Angus Douglass. They were later divorced.

Douglass was an investment banker for many years, a managing partner of Dillon Read.

Douglass returned to military service in World War II: as a member of the Eighth Air Force, he served as the senior United States Army Air Corps intelligence liaison officer assigned to the British Air Ministry and in the Allied Intelligence Group in the Pacific Theater. After the war, Douglass established the new Central Intelligence Agency, serving as its deputy director for a few months before returning to finance. Still, he returned to intelligence after a while: Douglass later served as assistant director of the CIA, from 1950 through July 1952.

Douglass married Adele Astaire, daughter of Frederick E. Astaire, and sister of the celebrated Broadway and Hollywood actor and dancer Fred Astaire, on April 29, 1947. For a time the Douglasses lived at Mount Gordon Farm in Middleburg, Virginia, where Adele was photographed for Life magazine in March 1961 (Life, 3/10/1961, p. 85).

Douglass died at the Roosevelt Hospital in New York City on October 8, 1971, at the age of 75.
