= Director of Central Intelligence =

1946–2004 Central Intelligence Agency head

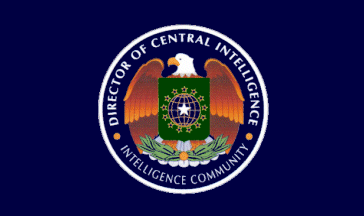
- Flag of the Director of Central Intelligence

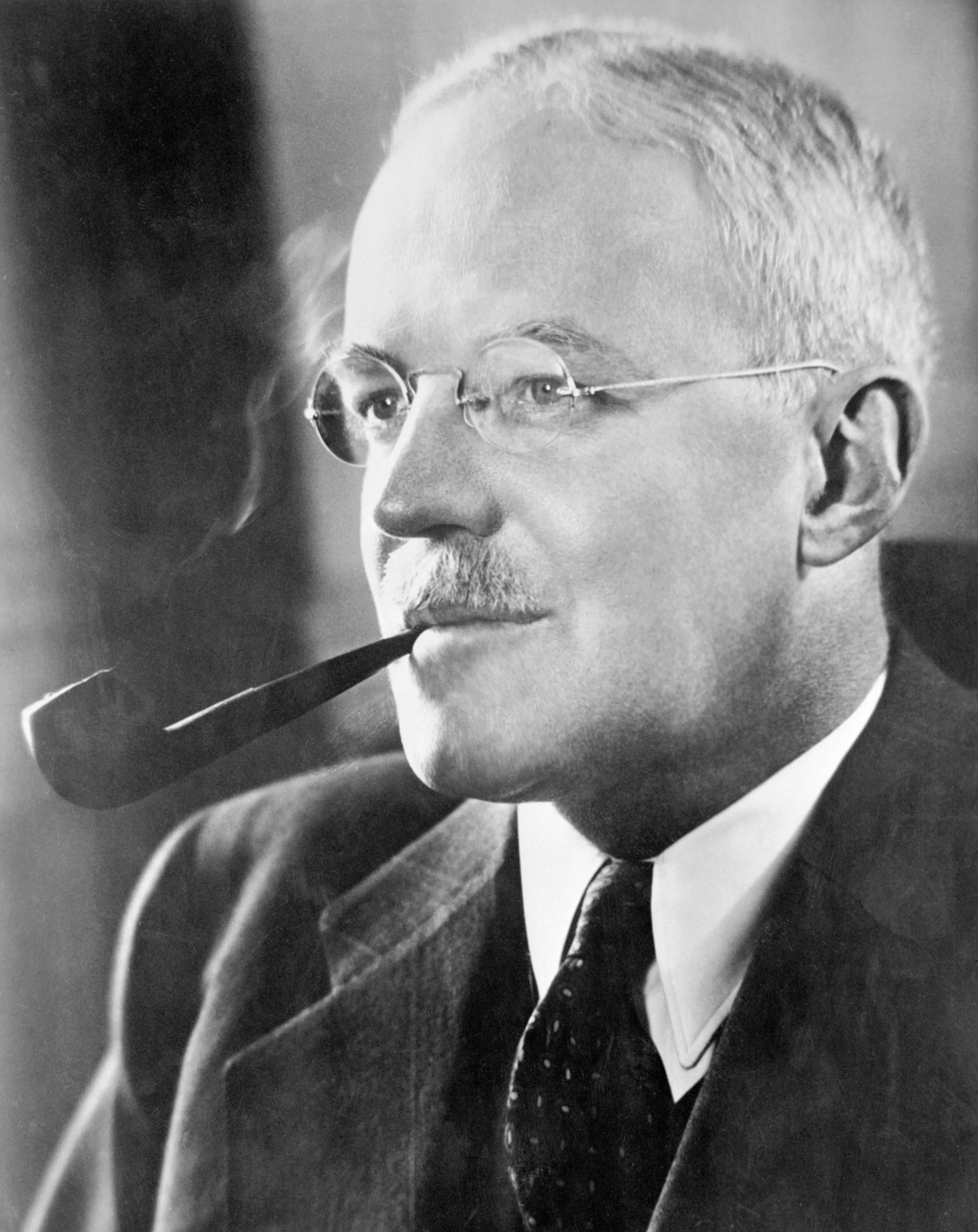
- Longest serving Allen Dulles; February 26, 1953 – November 29, 1961
- Central Intelligence Agency
- Abbreviation: DCI
- Member of: United States National Security Council
- Appointer: President of the United States with US Senate advice and consent
- Term length: No fixed term
- Formation: January 22, 1946
- First holder: Sidney Souers
- Final holder: Porter Goss
- Abolished: December 17, 2004
- Superseded by: Director of National Intelligence; Director of the Central Intelligence Agency
- Deputy: Deputy Director of Central Intelligence

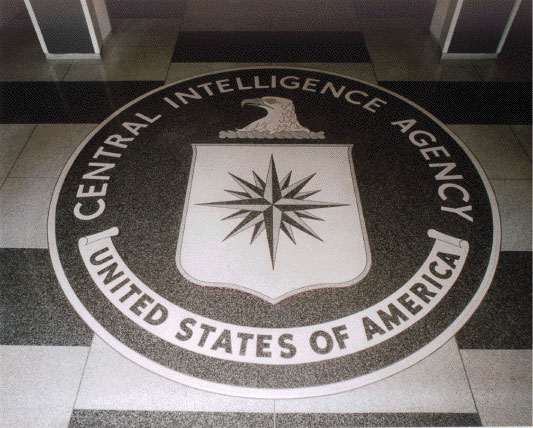
The 16-foot (5 m) diameter granite CIA seal in the lobby of the original headquarters building.

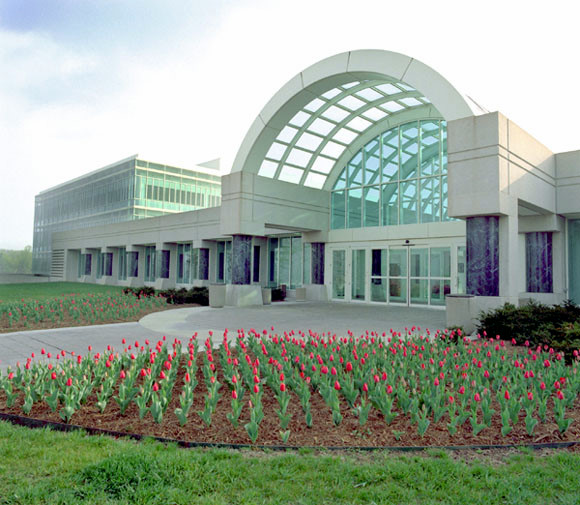
The entrance of the CIA headquarters

The director of central intelligence (DCI) was the head of the United States Central Intelligence Agency (CIA) from 1946 to 2004, acting as the principal intelligence advisor to the president of the United States and the United States National Security Council, as well as the coordinator of intelligence activities among and between the various United States intelligence agencies (collectively known as the United States Intelligence Community from 1981 onwards).

The office existed from January 1946 to December 17, 2004. After the Intelligence Reform and Terrorism Prevention Act it was replaced by the director of national intelligence (DNI) as head of the Intelligence Community and the director of the Central Intelligence Agency (D/CIA) as head of the CIA.

== History ==
The post of DCI was established by President Harry Truman on January 23, 1946, with Admiral Sidney Souers being the first DCI, followed by General Hoyt Vandenberg who served as DCI from June 1946 to May 1947. The DCI then ran the Central Intelligence Group (CIG), a predecessor of the CIA. The office of DCI thus predates the establishment of the Central Intelligence Agency. The CIA was created by the National Security Act of 1947, which formally defined the duties of the director of central intelligence. This 1947 Act also merged the prior National Intelligence Authority (NIA) into the newly established National Security Council (NSC).

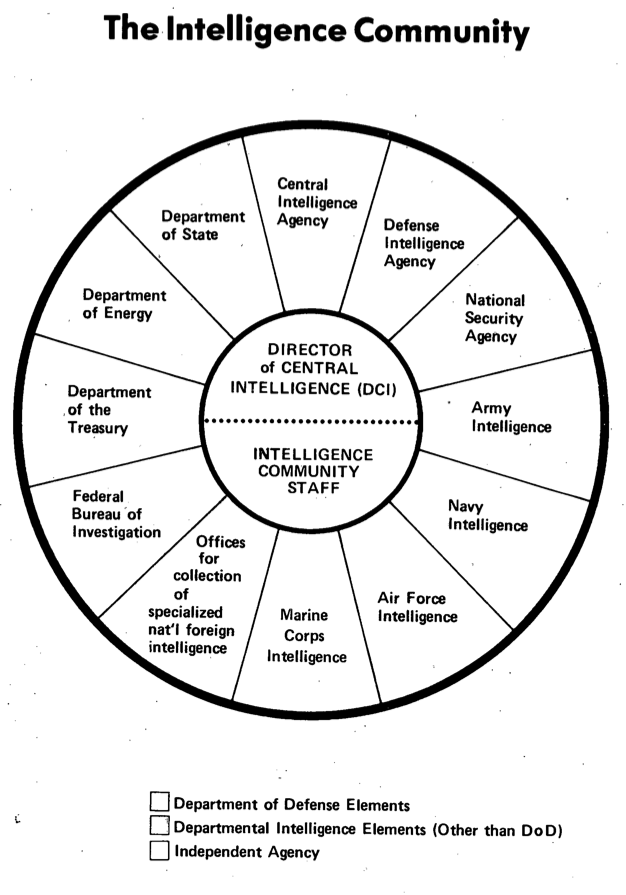
Before the year 2004, the Director of Central Intelligence was responsible for the entire Intelligence Community, and often sat alongside members of the President's Cabinet. This post was replaced by the Director of National Intelligence in 2004.

The Intelligence Advisory Board (IAB), which was the team of military intelligence chiefs from the Army, Air Force, Navy, and War Departments advising the DCI, was brought from CIG into the CIA, and lasted until the 1950's.

Until December 2004, the DCI was often referred to colloquially as the "CIA Director", even though he was head of both the CIA and the broader Intelligence Community. After the September 11, 2001, terrorist attacks on the United States and the subsequent investigation by the 9/11 Commission, a movement grew to re-organize the Intelligence Community. That movement prompted the passage of the Intelligence Reform and Terrorism Prevention Act in December 2004, which split the DCI's duties among two new offices. The Office of the director of national intelligence (DNI) would serve as head of the Intelligence Community and advise the NSC on intelligence matters. The director of the Central Intelligence Agency would serve as chief administrator of the CIA.

The reorganization took effect on December 17, 2004. The 19th and last DCI, Porter J. Goss, became the first director of the CIA while John Negroponte became the first DNI.

== List of directors of central intelligence ==
This position preceded the creation of the Central Intelligence Agency in 1947. The "Director of Central Intelligence" position was replaced by the director of the Central Intelligence Agency and director of national intelligence positions.

Status

Denotes an Acting Director of Central Intelligence

=== Office of the Coordinator of Information (1941 – 1942) / Office of Strategic Services (1942 – 1945) / Strategic Services Unit (1945 – 1946) ===
No.	Image	Name	Term of office			Ref.	President(s)
No.	Image	Name	Start	End	Duration	Ref.	President(s)
1		William J. Donovan	July 11, 1941	June 13, 1942	337 days	.	Franklin D. Roosevelt (1941–1945)
2		William J. Donovan	June 13, 1942	October 1, 1945	3 years, 110 days	.	Franklin D. Roosevelt (1941–1945)
3		John Magruder	October 1, 1945	January 22, 1946	113 days	.	Harry S. Truman (1945–1946)

=== Central Intelligence Group (1946 – 1947) / Central Intelligence Agency (1947 – 2004) ===
No.	Image	Name	Term of office			Ref.	President(s)
No.	Image	Name	Start	End	Duration	Ref.	President(s)
1		Sidney Souers	January 22, 1946	June 10, 1946	138 days		Harry S. Truman (1945–1953)
2		Hoyt Vandenberg	June 10, 1946	May 1, 1947	325 days		Harry S. Truman (1945–1953)
3		Roscoe Hillenkoetter	May 1, 1947	October 7, 1950	3 years, 159 days		Harry S. Truman (1945–1953)
4		Walter Smith	October 7, 1950	February 9, 1953	2 years, 125 days		Harry S. Truman (1945–1953)
4		Walter Smith	October 7, 1950	February 9, 1953	2 years, 125 days		Dwight D. Eisenhower (1953–1961)
–		Allen Dulles	February 9, 1953	February 26, 1953	17 days		Dwight D. Eisenhower (1953–1961)
5		Allen Dulles	February 26, 1953	November 29, 1961	8 years, 276 days		Dwight D. Eisenhower (1953–1961)
6		John McCone	November 29, 1961	April 28, 1965	3 years, 150 days		John F. Kennedy (1961–1963)
6		John McCone	November 29, 1961	April 28, 1965	3 years, 150 days		Lyndon B. Johnson (1963–1969)
7		William Raborn	April 28, 1965	June 30, 1966	1 year, 63 days		Lyndon B. Johnson (1963–1969)
8		Richard Helms	June 30, 1966	February 2, 1973	6 years, 217 days		Richard Nixon (1969–1974)
9		James Schlesinger	February 2, 1973	July 2, 1973	150 days		Richard Nixon (1969–1974)
–		Vernon Walters; Acting	July 2, 1973	September 4, 1973	64 days		Richard Nixon (1969–1974)
10		William Colby	September 4, 1973	January 30, 1976	2 years, 148 days		Richard Nixon (1969–1974)
10		William Colby	September 4, 1973	January 30, 1976	2 years, 148 days		Gerald Ford (1974–1977)
11		George H. W. Bush	January 30, 1976	January 20, 1977	356 days		Gerald Ford (1974–1977)
–		Henry Knoche; Acting	January 20, 1977	March 9, 1977	48 days		Jimmy Carter (1977–1981)
12		Stansfield Turner	March 9, 1977	January 20, 1981	3 years, 317 days		Jimmy Carter (1977–1981)
13		William Casey	January 20, 1981	January 29, 1987; On leave: December 18, 1986 – January 29, 1987	6 years, 9 days		Ronald Reagan (1981–1989)
–		Bob Gates; Acting	December 18, 1986	May 26, 1987	159 days		Ronald Reagan (1981–1989)
14		William Webster	May 26, 1987	August 31, 1991	4 years, 97 days		Ronald Reagan (1981–1989)
14		William Webster	May 26, 1987	August 31, 1991	4 years, 97 days		George H. W. Bush (1989–1993)
–		Richard Kerr; Acting	September 1, 1991	November 6, 1991	48 days		George H. W. Bush (1989–1993)
15		Bob Gates	November 6, 1991	January 20, 1993	1 year, 75 days		George H. W. Bush (1989–1993)
–		William Studeman; Acting	January 21, 1993	February 5, 1993	15 days		Bill Clinton (1993–2001)
16		Jim Woolsey	February 5, 1993	January 10, 1995	1 year, 339 days		Bill Clinton (1993–2001)
–		William Studeman; Acting	January 11, 1995	May 9, 1995	118 days		Bill Clinton (1993–2001)
17		John Deutch	May 10, 1995	December 15, 1996	1 year, 219 days		Bill Clinton (1993–2001)
–		George Tenet	December 16, 1996	July 11, 1997	207 days		Bill Clinton (1993–2001)
18		George Tenet	July 11, 1997	July 11, 2004	7 years, 0 days		George W. Bush (2001–2009)
–		John McLaughlin; Acting	July 12, 2004	September 24, 2004	74 days		George W. Bush (2001–2009)
19		Porter Goss	September 24, 2004	April 21, 2005	209 days		George W. Bush (2001–2009)

== Directors' management styles and effect on operations ==
=== Roscoe H. Hillenkoetter, 1947–1950 ===
Rear Admiral Roscoe H. Hillenkoetter was the third director of central intelligence, but the first who served as the Director of the Central Intelligence Agency. During his tenure, a National Security Council Directive on Office of Special Projects, June 18, 1948, (NSC 10/2) further gave the CIA the authority to carry out covert operations "against hostile foreign states or groups or in support of friendly foreign states or groups but which are so planned and conducted that any US Government responsibility for them is not evident to unauthorized persons." Those operations, however, were initially conducted by other agencies such as the Office of Policy Coordination. See Approval of Clandestine and Covert Operations and Clandestine HUMINT and Covert Action for details of the eventual merger of these operations with the CIA, as well as how the equivalent functions were done in other countries.

=== Walter Bedell Smith, 1950–1953 ===
During the first years of its existence, other branches of the US federal government did not exercise very much supervision over the Central Intelligence Agency. Supposedly justified by the desire to match and defeat Soviet actions throughout the Eastern Hemisphere, it undertook a task that many believed could be accomplished only through an approach similar to the Soviet intelligence agencies, under names including NKVD, MVD, NKGB, MGB, and KGB. Those Soviet organizations also had domestic responsibilities.

=== Allen W. Dulles, 1953–1961 ===
The rapid expansion of the CIA, and a developed sense of independence under the DCI Allen Dulles exacerbated the problem of the US Intelligence Community's freedom from independent review. After the armed landing of Cuban exiles in the Bay of Pigs Invasion of Cuba in 1961, President John F. Kennedy discharged Dulles and replaced him. Dulles was an OSS veteran from World War II. His autobiography is more noteworthy for giving insight into the mindset of key people in the field than it is in giving a detailed description of the CIA and its operations.

=== John McCone, 1961–1965 ===
President John F. Kennedy exercised greater supervision, and he appointed a Republican with a general engineering background, John McCone. McCone, despite a lack of intelligence agency background, is often considered one of the most competent DCIs, and an excellent manager. The agency stepped up its activity in Southeast Asia under President Lyndon Johnson. McCone resigned from his position of DCI in April 1965, believing himself to have been unappreciated by Johnson. McCone's final policy memorandum to Johnson argued that expansion of the War in Vietnam would arouse national and world discontent over the war, before it defeated the North Vietnamese regime.

=== William Raborn, 1965–1966 ===
Raborn, a distinguished naval officer who directed the design and development of the entire Polaris ballistic missile submarine system, had a somewhat short and unhappy tenure as the DCI. His background included no foreign relations experience, and intelligence experience only concerning naval operations. CIA historians have said "Raborn did not 'take' to the DCI job", in their opinion. Raborn resigned as the DCI on June 30, 1966, having served for only fourteen months. He was then replaced by his deputy, Richard Helms.

=== Richard M. Helms, 1966–1973 ===
Helms was an OSS and CIA veteran, and the first DCI to have risen through the ranks at CIA. Helms became the director of the Office of Special Operations (OSO) after the CIA's disastrous role in the attempted Bay of Pigs Invasion of Cuba in 1961. Helms was made the deputy director of central intelligence under Admiral William Raborn. A year later, in 1966, he was appointed as the director.

In the early 1970s, partially as a result of the Watergate affair break-ins under President Richard Nixon, the United States Congress took a more active role in intelligence agencies, as did independent commissions such as the 1975 United States President's Commission on CIA activities within the United States, also called the Rockefeller Commission after its chairman. Revelations about past CIA activities, such as assassinations and attempted assassinations of foreign leaders, illegal domestic spying on American citizens, drew considerable congressional oversight that had not been previously exercised.

Certain individuals involved in the Watergate break-ins had worked, in the past, for the CIA. In an audio tape provoking Nixon's resignation as president, Nixon ordered his chief of staff, H. R. Haldeman, to tell the CIA that further investigation of the Watergate affair would "open the whole can of worms" about the Bay of Pigs Invasion of Cuba, and, therefore, that the CIA should tell the FBI to cease investigating the Watergate burglary, due to reasons of "national security". Helms refused.

The ease of Helms's role under President Lyndon Johnson changed with the arrival of President Richard Nixon and Nixon's national security advisor Henry Kissinger. After the debacle of Watergate, from which Helms succeeded in distancing the CIA as far as possible, the agency came under much tighter congressional control. Nixon, however, considered Helms to be disloyal, and fired him as DCI in 1973. Helms was the only DCI convicted for irregularities in office; his autobiography describes his reaction to the charges.

=== James R. Schlesinger, 1973 ===
Schlesinger became the director of central intelligence on 2 February 1973, after the previous director, Richard Helms, had been fired for his refusal to block the Watergate Affair's investigation. Although Schlesinger's service at the CIA was short, barely six months, it was a stormy one as he continued to undertake comprehensive organizational and personnel changes. He became so unpopular at CIA headquarters in Langley, Virginia, that a security camera was installed opposite his official portrait for fear it would be vandalized. By this time he had a reputation as a tough, forthright, and outspoken administrator. Schlesinger's appointment as Secretary of Defense cut short his service as DCI. He commissioned reports—known as the "Family Jewels"—on illegal activities by the agency.

=== William Colby, 1973–1976 ===
William Colby was another intelligence professional who was promoted to the top job. His autobiography was entitled "Honorable Men", and he believed that a nation had to believe such people made up its intelligence service. In December 1974, investigative journalist Seymour Hersh broke the news of the "Family Jewels" (leaked to him by Colby) in a front-page article in The New York Times, revealing that the CIA had assassinated foreign leaders, and had conducted surveillance on some seven thousand American citizens involved in the antiwar movement (Operation CHAOS).

Congress responded to the "Family Jewels" in 1975, investigating the CIA in the Senate via the Church Committee, chaired by Senator Frank Church (D-Idaho), and in the House of Representatives via the Pike Committee, chaired by Congressman Otis Pike (D-NY). President Gerald Ford created the aforementioned Rockefeller Commission, and issued an Executive Order prohibiting the assassination of foreign leaders.

Colby's tenure as DCI congressional investigations into alleged US intelligence malfeasance over the preceding twenty-five years. Colby cooperated, not out of a desire for major reforms, but in the belief that the actual scope of such misdeeds was not great enough to cause lasting damage to the CIA's reputation. He believed that cooperating with Congress was the only way to save the agency from dissolution. Colby also believed that the CIA had a moral obligation to cooperate with the Congress and demonstrate that the CIA was accountable to the Constitution. This caused a major rift within the CIA ranks, with many old-line officers such as former DCI Richard Helms believing that the CIA should have resisted congressional intrusion.

Colby's time as DCI was also eventful on the world stage. Shortly after he assumed leadership, the Yom Kippur War broke out, an event that surprised not only the American intelligence agencies but also the Israelis. This intelligence surprise reportedly affected Colby's credibility with the Nixon administration. Meanwhile, after many years of involvement, South Vietnam fell to Communist forces in April 1975, a particularly difficult blow for Colby, who had dedicated so much of his life and career to the American effort there. Events in the arms control field, Angola, the Middle East, and elsewhere also demanded attention.

=== George H. W. Bush, 1976–1977 ===
George H. W. Bush's confirmation as the director of central intelligence was opposed by many politicians and citizens who were still reeling from the Watergate scandal (when Bush was the head of the Republican National Committee, and a steadfast defender of Nixon) and the Church Committee investigations. Many arguments against Bush's initial confirmation were that he was too partisan for the office. The Washington Post, George Will, and Senator Frank Church were some notable figures opposed to Bush's nomination. After a pledge by Bush not to run for either president or vice president in 1976, opposition to his nomination died down.

Bush served as the DCI for 355 days, from January 30, 1976, to January 20, 1977. The CIA had been rocked by a series of revelations, including disclosures based on investigations by the Senate's Church Committee, about the CIA's illegal and unauthorized activities, and Bush was credited with helping to restore the agency's morale. On February 18, 1976, President Gerald Ford issued Executive Order 11905, which established policy guidelines and restrictions for individual intelligence agencies, and clarified intelligence authorities and responsibilities. Bush was given 90 days to implement the new order, which called for a major reorganization of the American Intelligence Community and firmly stated that intelligence activities could not be directed against American citizens. In his capacity as DCI, Bush gave national security briefings to Jimmy Carter both as a presidential candidate and as president-elect, and discussed the possibility of remaining in that position in a Carter administration.

George H. W. Bush eventually became the 43rd US vice president in 1981 and the 41st US president in 1989 and is the only CIA director to serve in either office.

=== Stansfield Turner, 1977–1981 ===
A US Naval Academy classmate of Jimmy Carter's, Turner enjoyed the confidence of the White House, but his emphasis on technical methods of intelligence collection, such as SIGINT and IMINT, and his apparent dislike for, and firing of, HUMINT specialists made him quite unpopular within the CIA. Turner eliminated more than 800 operational positions in what was called the "Halloween Massacre", invoking a moniker previously used in conjunction with President Ford's 1975 staff reorganization. This organizational direction is notable because his successor William J. Casey was seen to have a completely opposite approach, focusing much of his attention on HUMINT. Turner gave notable testimony to Congress revealing much of the extent of the MKULTRA program, which the CIA ran from the early 1950s to late 1960s. Reform and simplification of the intelligence community's multilayered secrecy system was one of Turner's significant initiatives, but produced no results by the time he left office. He also wrote a book on his experience at CIA.

During Turner's term as head of the CIA, he became outraged when former agent Frank Snepp published a book called Decent Interval which exposed incompetence among senior American government personnel during the fall of Saigon. accused Snepp of breaking the secrecy agreement required of all CIA agents, and then later was forced to admit under cross-examination that he had never read the agreement signed by Snepp. Regardless, the CIA ultimately won its case against Snepp at the US Supreme Court. The court forced Snepp to turn over all his profits from Decent Interval and to seek preclearance of any future writings about intelligence work for the rest of his life. The CIA would later rely on the Snepp legal precedent in forcing Turner to seek preclearance of his own memoirs, which were highly critical of President Ronald Reagan's policies.

=== William J. Casey, 1981–1987 ===
During his tenure at the CIA, Casey played a large part in the shaping of Reagan's foreign policy, particularly its approach to Soviet international activity. Based on a book, The Terror Network, Casey believed that the Soviet Union was the source of most terrorist activity in the world, in spite of CIA analysts providing evidence that this was in fact black propaganda by the CIA itself. Casey obtained a report from a professor that agreed with his view, which convinced Ronald Reagan that there was a threat.

Casey oversaw the re-expansion of the Intelligence Community, in particular the CIA, to funding and human resource levels greater than those before resource cuts during the Carter administration. During his tenure restrictions were lifted on the use of the CIA to directly, covertly influence the internal and foreign affairs of countries relevant to American policy.

This period of the Cold War saw an increase of the agency's anti-Soviet activities around the world. Notably he oversaw covert assistance to the mujahadeen resistance in Afghanistan, with a budget of over $1 billion, working closely with Akhtar Abdur Rahman (the director general of Pakistan's Inter-Services Intelligence directorate). The agency aided Solidarity movement in Poland, and a number of coups and attempted coups in South and Central America.

Casey was also the principal architect of the arms-for-hostages deal that became known as the Iran–Contra affair.

Hours before Casey was scheduled to testify before Congress about his knowledge of Iran–Contra, he was reported to have been rendered incapable of speech, and was later hospitalized. In his 1987 book, The Washington Post reporter Bob Woodward, who had interviewed Casey on numerous occasions, said that he had gained entry to Casey's hospital room for a final, four-minute-long encounter—a claim that was met with disbelief in many quarters, and adamant denial by Casey's wife, Sofia. According to Woodward, when he asked Casey if he knew about the diversion of funds to the Nicaraguan Contras, "His head jerked up hard. He stared, and finally nodded yes."

=== William H. Webster, 1987–1991 ===
William H. Webster came from a legal background, including serving as a federal judge and as the director of the FBI. He was expected, with this background, to clear out all legal irregularities at CIA. Repercussions from the Iran–Contra arms smuggling scandal included the creation of the Intelligence Authorization Act in 1991. It defined covert operations as secret missions in geopolitical areas where the United States is neither openly nor apparently engaged. This also required an authorizing chain of command, including an official, presidential finding report, and the informing of the House and Senate Intelligence Committees, which, in emergencies, requires only "timely notification".

=== Robert M. Gates, 1991–1993 ===
Robert Gates was nominated to become the director of central intelligence in early 1987. He withdrew his name after it became clear the Senate would reject the nomination due to controversy about his role in the Iran–Contra affair.

Gates was nominated, for the second time, for the post of Director of Central Intelligence by President George H. W. Bush on May 14, 1991, confirmed by the United States Senate on November 5, and sworn in on November 6, becoming the only career officer in the CIA's history (as of 2009) to rise from an entry-level CIA employee to the director of the CIA.

The final report of the Independent Counsel for Iran/Contra Matters, issued on August 4, 1993, said that Gates "was close to many figures who played significant roles in the Iran/contra affair and was in a position to have known of their activities. The evidence developed by Independent Counsel did not warrant indictment..."

=== R. James Woolsey, 1993–1995 ===
As the director of central intelligence, Woolsey is notable for having a very limited relationship with President Bill Clinton. According to the journalist Richard Miniter:

Never once in his two-year tenure did CIA director James Woolsey ever have a one-on-one meeting with Clinton. Even semiprivate meetings were rare. They only happened twice. Woolsey told me: "It wasn't that I had a bad relationship with the President. It just didn't exist."

Another quotation about his relationship with Clinton, according to Paula Kaufman of Insight magazine:

Remember the guy who in 1994 crashed his plane onto the White House lawn? That was me trying to get an appointment to see President Clinton.

David Halberstam noted in his book War in a Time of Peace that Clinton chose Woolsey as the CIA director because the Clinton campaign had courted neo-conservatives leading up to the 1992 election, promising to be tougher on Taiwan, Bosnia, and on human rights in China, and it was decided that they ought to give at least one neo-conservative a job in the administration.

=== John M. Deutch, 1995–1996 ===
In 1995, President Bill Clinton appointed John Deutch as the director of central intelligence (cabinet rank in the Clinton administration). However, Deutch was initially reluctant to accept this appointment. As the head of the CIA, Deutch continued the policy of his predecessor R. James Woolsey to declassify records pertaining to American covert operations during the Cold War.

In 1996, the US House Permanent Select Committee on Intelligence issued a congressional report estimating that: "Hundreds of employees on a daily basis are directed to break extremely serious laws in countries around the world in the face of frequently sophisticated efforts by foreign governments to catch them. A safe estimate is that several hundred times every day (easily 100,000 times a year) DO officers engage in highly illegal activities (according to foreign law) that not only risk political embarrassment to the U.S. but also endanger the freedom if not lives of the participating foreign nationals and, more than occasionally, of the clandestine officer himself."

In this same document, the committee wrote, "Considering these facts and recent history, which has shown that the [Director of the Central Intelligence Agency], whether he wants to or not, is held accountable for overseeing the [Clandestine Service], the DCI must work closely with the Director of the CS and hold him fully and directly responsible to him."

Soon after Deutch's departure from the CIA in 1996 it was revealed that classified materials had been kept on several of Deutch's laptop computers designated as unclassified. In January 1997, the CIA began a formal security investigation of the matter. Senior management members at the CIA declined to fully pursue the security breach. More than two years after his departure, the matter was referred to the Department of Justice, where Attorney General Janet Reno declined to prosecute. She did, however, recommend an investigation to determine whether Deutch should retain his security clearance. Clinton issued a presidential pardon on his last day in office.

=== George J. Tenet, 1996–2004 ===
George Tenet was appointed the deputy director of central intelligence in July 1995. After John Deutch's abrupt resignation in December 1996, Tenet served as acting director until he was officially appointed the position on July 11, 1997, after a unanimous confirmation vote in the Senate. This had been followed by the withdrawal of Anthony Lake, whose nomination had been blocked by Republicans in the Senate. While the director of central intelligence has typically been replaced by an incoming administration ever since President Jimmy Carter replaced DCI George H. W. Bush, Tenet served past the end of the Clinton administration and through the first term of George W. Bush.

Tenet embarked on a mission to regenerate the CIA, which had fallen on hard times since the end of the Cold War. The number of new trainee agents recruited each year had fallen to an all-time low, a 25-percent decline from the Cold War peak. Tenet appealed to the original mission of the agency, which had been to "prevent another Pearl Harbor". The problem was to foresee where danger might come from in the post–Cold War world. Tenet focused on potential problems such as "the transformation of Russia and China", "rogue states" like North Korea, Iran, and Iraq, and terrorism.

In 1999, Tenet put forward a grand "Plan" for dealing with the al-Qaeda organization. This effort supposedly put the CIA in a better position to respond after the September 11, 2001, attacks. As Tenet expressed it in his book,

How could [an intelligence] community without a strategic plan tell the President of the United States just four days after 9/11 how to attack the Afghan sanctuary and operate against al-Qaeda in ninety-two countries around the world?

On September 15, 2001, Tenet presented the Worldwide Attack Matrix, a blueprint for what became known as the war on terror. He proposed firstly to send CIA teams into Afghanistan to collect intelligence on, and mount covert operations against, al-Qaeda and the Taliban. The teams would act jointly with military Special Operations units. "President Bush later praised this proposal, saying it had been a turning point in his thinking."

After the September 11, 2001, attacks, many observers criticized the American Intelligence Community for numerous "intelligence failures" as one of the major reasons why the attacks were not prevented. In August 2007, part of a secret report written by the CIA Inspector General was made public (originally written in 2005 but kept secret). Its 19-page summary states that Tenet knew the dangers of Al Qaeda well before September 2001, but that the leadership of the CIA did not do enough to prevent any attacks. Tenet reacted to the publication of this report by calling it "flat wrong".

Bob Woodward, in his book Plan of Attack, wrote that Tenet privately lent his personal authority to the intelligence reports about weapons of mass destruction (WMDs) in Iraq. At a meeting on December 12, 2002, he assured Bush that the evidence against Saddam Hussein amounted to a "slam dunk case". After several months of refusing to confirm this statement, Tenet later stated that this remark was taken out of context. (Tenet indicated that the comment was made pursuant to a discussion about how to convince the American people to support invading Iraq, and that, in his opinion, the best way to convince the people would be by explaining the dangers posed by Iraq's WMD i.e., the public relations sale of the war via the WMD, according to Tenet, would be a "slam dunk".) The search following the 2003 invasion of Iraq by American, British, and other international forces yielded no stockpiles of nuclear WMDs in Iraq, except for tens of thousands of chemical shells found stacked from floors to ceilings in every room of what was putatively a school building in the Anbar province. Tenet and his Director of Operations resigned at about this same time, and it has been suggested these resignations were in penance over the WMD issue in Iraq.

=== Porter J. Goss, 2004–2005 ===
During his junior year at Yale, Porter Goss was recruited by the CIA. He spent much of the 1960s—roughly from 1960 until 1971—working for the Directorate of Operations, the clandestine services of the CIA. There he first worked in Latin America and the Caribbean and later in Europe. The full details are not known due to the classified nature of the CIA, but Goss has said that he had worked in Haiti, Santo Domingo, and Mexico. Goss, who has said that he has recruited and trained foreign agents, worked in Miami for much of the time. Goss was involved in the Cuban Missile Crisis in 1962, telling The Washington Post in 2002 that he had done some "small-boat handling" and had "some very interesting moments in the Florida Straits."

He served in Congress for 16 years, as a Republican House member from Florida, until his appointment as director of central intelligence. While in the House, Goss consistently and emphatically defended the CIA and supported strong budget increases for the agency, even during a time of tight budgets and Clintonian slashes to other parts of the intelligence budgets. In mid-2004, Goss took a very strong position, during what had already been announced as his last congressional term, urging specific reforms and corrections in the way the CIA carried out its activities, lest it become "just another government bureaucracy."

After growing pressure, Congress established the Joint Inquiry into Intelligence Community Activities before and after the Terrorist Attacks of September 11, 2001, a joint inquiry of the two intelligence committees, led by Goss and Senator Bob Graham. Goss and Graham made it clear that their goal was not to identify specific wrongdoing: Graham said the inquiry would not play "the blame game about what went wrong from an intelligence perspective", and Goss said, "This is not a who-shall-we-hang type of investigation. It is about where are the gaps in America's defense and what do we do about it type of investigation." The inquiry's final report was released in December 2002 and focused entirely on the CIA and FBI's activities, including no information on the White House's activities. Ray McGovern, a 27-year veteran of the CIA and a frequent commentator on intelligence issues, believed the report showed that Goss gave "clear priority to providing political protection for the president" when conducting the inquiry. Goss chiefly blamed President Bill Clinton for the recent CIA failures. He confided in a reporter: "The one thing I lose sleep about is thinking what could I have done better, how could I have gotten more attention on this problem sooner." When asked whether he ever brought up his concerns with the administration, Goss claimed he had met three times with Clinton to discuss "certain problems". The upshot? "He was patient and we had an interesting conversation but it was quite clear he didn't value the intelligence community to the degree President Bush does."

Goss was nominated to become the new DCI on August 10, 2004. The appointment was challenged by some prominent Democrats. Sen. John D. Rockefeller IV (D-WV), vice chairman of the Senate Intelligence Committee, expressed concerns that Goss was too politically partisan, given his public remarks against Democrats while serving as chairman of the House Intelligence Committee. Another Democratic member of the committee, Ron Wyden (D-OR), expressed concerns that given Goss's history within and ties to the CIA, he would be too disinclined to push for institutional change. In an interview carried out by Michael Moore's production company on March 3, 2004, Goss described himself as "probably not qualified" for a job within the CIA, because the language skills the agency seeks are not languages he speaks and because the people applying for positions within the CIA's four directorates have such keen technical and analytic skills, which he did not have when he applied to the agency in the early 1960s.

He brought with him five personal staff, who were to implement change that became unpopular with CIA professionals. Steve Kappes—the Director of Operations—and his subordinates including Michael Sulick, Kappes's then-deputy, resigned early in Goss's tenure. Although Kappes came back to a responsible position, it has been reported that he quit the agency rather than carry out a request by Goss to reassign Michael Sulick. Following Goss's departure, both Kappes and Sulick have returned to positions of higher authority in the US Intelligence Community. Kappes is the Deputy Director of the CIA and Sulick was appointed Director of the National Clandestine Service on September 14, 2007.

Speculations on the reason for his departure include a desire to have military agency heads, or, perhaps more likely,

For many analysts, Goss' departure was inevitable, given the widespread perception that the White House had lost confidence in his ability to reorganise the CIA. Goss' departure appears to have been due, at least in part, to his repeated clashes with John Negroponte who was appointed in 2005 as the US Director of National Intelligence, a new post created to co-ordinate all 16 of the US intelligence agencies in the aftermath of the Al-Qaeda attacks.

== See also ==
- Air Force Office of Scientific Research
- DARPA
- Exceptional Collector Award
- National Geospatial-Intelligence Agency
- Office of Naval Research

== Explanatory notes ==
1.Clinton nominated Anthony Lake to become the director of central intelligence in December 1996. However, Lake withdrew in March 1997 after questioning by the United States Senate Intelligence Committee turned contentious. George Tenet was later nominated and confirmed for the position.
