= Central Intelligence Group =

United States security agency

Agency overview
- Formed: 22 January 1946
- Preceding agencies: Office of Strategic Services; Strategic Services Unit
- Dissolved: 18 September 1947
- Superseding agency: Central Intelligence Agency
- Agency executives: Sidney Souers, 1st Director of Central Intelligence; Hoyt Vandenberg, 2nd Director of Central Intelligence; Kingman Douglass, Assistant Director and Acting Deputy Director; Louis Joseph Fortier, Assistant Director and Acting Chief of Operational Services; William B. Goggins, Chief of the Central Planning Staff; James S. Lay, Jr., Secretary of the Intelligence Advisory Board; Ludwell Lee Montague, Chief of the Office of Reports and Estimates; Donald H. Galloway, Director of the Office of Special Operations
- Parent department: National Intelligence Authority
- Child agency: Intelligence Advisory Board

In the United States, the Central Intelligence Group (CIG) was the direct successor to the Office of Strategic Services (OSS), and the Strategic Services Unit (SSU), and the direct predecessor to the Central Intelligence Agency (CIA). The official duties of CIG as quoted by Assistant Executive Director Sheffield Edwards:

The Central Intelligence Group is a recently created interdepartmental organization in which the State, War, Navy, and sometimes other departments participate. It coordinates all activities of the Government involved in obtaining and analyzing information about foreign countries which this country needs for its national security. It also furnishes interdepartmental analyses of this type of information or use by Government officials.

The supervising authority of the CIG was the National Intelligence Authority.

== History ==
With the official end of World War II, President Harry S. Truman and members of the US Congress decided to officially dissolve the vast intelligence agency of the OSS. The OSS had been specifically a wartime organization, and the war was over. The assumption by many in the government during the war was that upon the conclusion of hostilities, the United States would immediately terminate any hegemony it had fostered in global intelligence gathering.

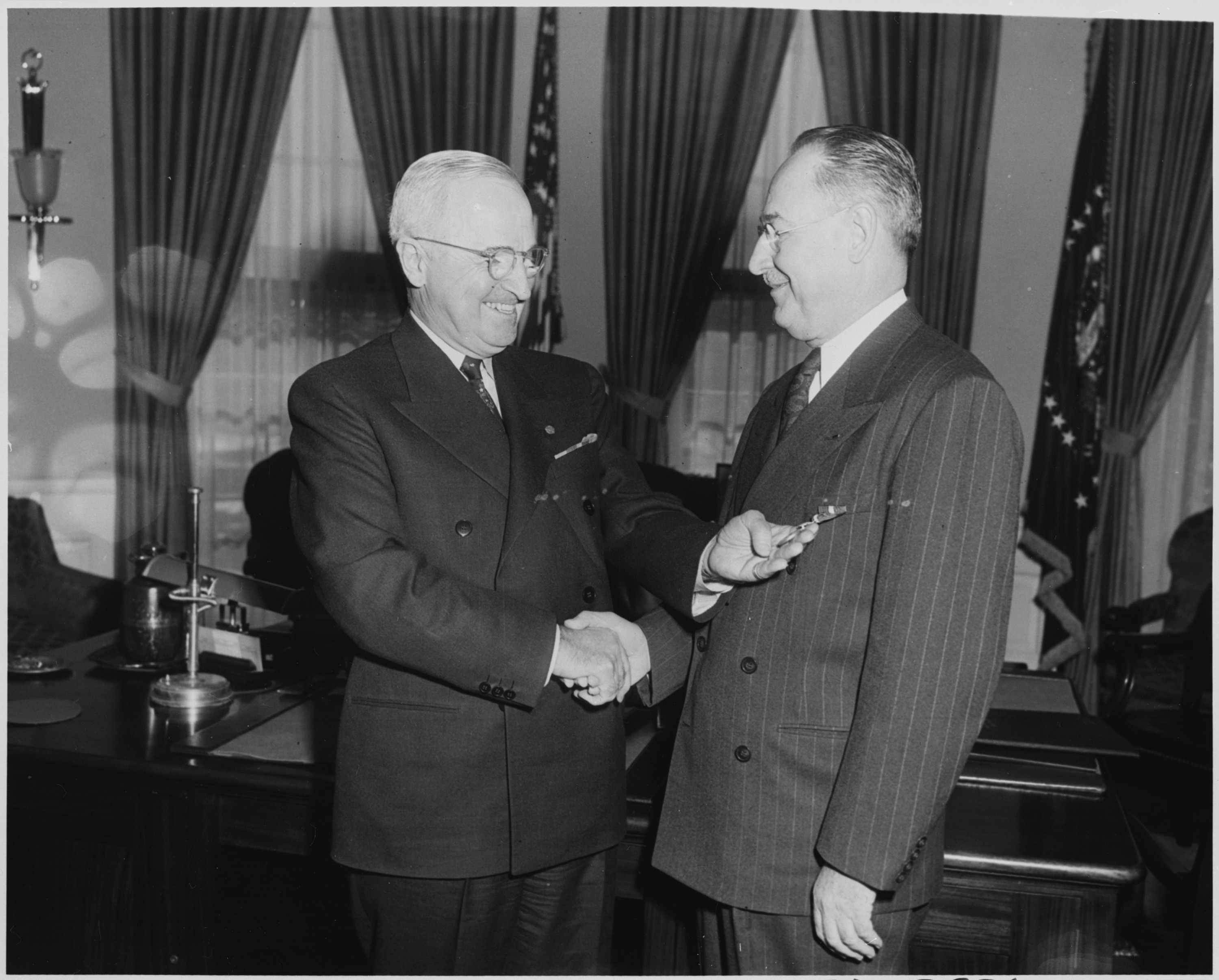
President Truman and Sidney Souers.

CIG formally came into being with Directive 1181/5, the president's directive of 22 January 1946, wherein the president authorized CIG to: "...perform for the benefit of said intelligence agencies, such services of common concern as the National Intelligence Authority determines can be more efficiently accomplished centrally."

Members of the Bureau of the Budget and the Department of Justice were not satisfied with the legality of a group being established by a presidential directive without any accompanying Executive Order, but following discussions resulted in satisfaction of all parties by 23 May 1946. For the entirety of its short existence, the CIG was enumerated in law only by the presidential directive, until such time that the United States Congress created the CIA.

The activation ceremony of this intelligence agency two days later, on 24 January 1946, involved the president of the United States, Harry Truman, calling Rear Admiral Sidney Souers and Fleet Admiral Willian D. Leahy to the White House, and presenting them both with black cloaks, black hats, and wooden daggers, before reading aloud the presidential directive outlining their new duties. The playful attitude of the president in standing up the CIG indicated the administration's desire that US intelligence remain small during peacetime, and not become again a behemoth agency like it had been during the war. Souers and Truman agreed at this stage that CIG should be a small group, composed of members assigned by the military Departments, and to be operated as a cooperative interdepartmental activity.

Admiral Souers immediately showed that his approach to running an intelligence community was different than the practice of his predecessor, Wild Bill Donovan. Donovan had believed that the director of central intelligence (DCI) should have as much power as a Cabinet secretary, but Souers believed that the DCI should be subservient to them. Souers believed that the CIG should be fostered under the leadership of the secretaries, under both the president and the National Intelligence Authority, and also understood that the military Chiefs were not comfortable with an intelligence community that could become more powerful than they were.

Souers understood that if the DCI were as powerful as a secretary, they would constantly have to battle with the Cabinet in order to gain the president's assent for memoranda and directives. Further, having such power would also mean that the DCI would constantly be battling a secret war of politics at home, in addition to the real wars they would have to wage abroad.

Souers' mandate was "that the CIG should bring all intelligence activities into cooperation and harmony..." This involved the creation of the Intelligence Advisory Board, which was to be composed of four permanent members (the intelligence chiefs of the Departments of State, War, Navy, and the Air Force), and representatives from other agencies at the director's invitation.

Souers initially wanted to create Ad Hoc committees for the study of specific areas, but organizing them proved difficult, so he instead assigned these duties to the Central Planning Staff, which was managed by William B. Goggins.

== Organizational structure ==
- Office of Collection and Dissemination
- Office of Security
- Office of Reports and Estimates
- Office of Operations
- Interdepartmental Coordinating and Planning Staff
- Executive Staff
- Office of Research and Evaluation

=== Office of Special Operations (OSO) ===
On September 20, 1945, President Truman signed Executive Order 9621, terminating the OSS. Potentially due to an administrative error, the order only allowed the agency ten days to close. William J. Donovan is noted as having "exploded" upon the news that he only had two weeks to dissolve the OSS, and pressured the government to maintain some of the organization's strategic structures.

The War Department took over the Secret Intelligence (SI) and Counter-Espionage (X-2) Branches, which were then housed in the new Strategic Services Unit (SSU). Brigadier General John Magruder (formerly Donovan's Deputy Director for Intelligence in OSS) became the new SSU director. He oversaw the liquidation of the OSS and managed the institutional preservation of its clandestine intelligence capability.

On July 11, 1946, at the behest of Louis Joseph Fortier and John L. Magruder, the National Intelligence Authority (NIA) authorized Souers to create within the structure of CIG a new office which would absorb personnel and functions from the Strategic Services Unit. The new office at CIG which would absorb those duties of the SSU, thereby consolidating U.S. clandestine intelligence activities under a unified command, would be called the Office of Special Operations (OSO). This reorganization aimed to create a professional and secure clandestine service, setting the foundation for future CIA operations.

The Assistant Director for the Office of Special Operations (ADSO) became Donald Henry Galloway.
