= John L. Magruder =

United States Army general

John Magruder
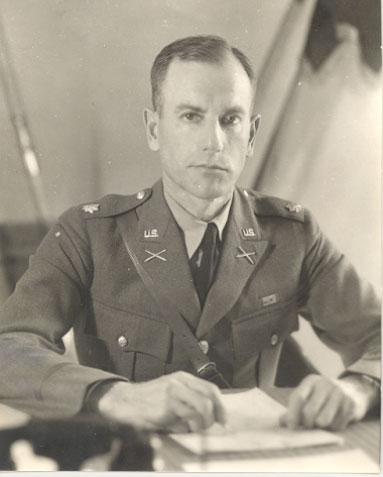

1st Director of the Strategic Services Unit
- In office October 1, 1945 – April 2, 1946
- President: Harry S. Truman
- Preceded by: William Donovan (Office of Strategic Services)
- Succeeded by: William W. Quinn (SSU); Sidney Souers (CIG)

Deputy Director of Secret Intelligence
- In office 1943–1945
- Preceded by: Office Established
- Succeeded by: Office Abolished

Personal details
- Born: June 3, 1887 Woodstock, Virginia, U.S.
- Died: April 30, 1958 (aged 70) Washington, D.C., U.S.
- Resting place: Arlington National Cemetery
- Education: Virginia Military Institute (BA)
- Awards: Army Distinguished Service Medal; Bronze Star; World War I Victory Medal (with four service stars); American Defense Service Medal; American Campaign Medal; Asiatic-Pacific Campaign Medal; European-African-Middle Eastern Campaign Medal; World War II Victory Medal

Military service
- Allegiance: United States
- Branch/service: United States Army
- Years of service: 1910–1946
- Rank: Brigadier General
- Battles/wars: World War I World War II

John Leslie Magruder (June 3, 1887 – April 30, 1958) was an American military and intelligence officer who was deputy director of the Office of Strategic Services and director of the Strategic Services Unit. He held the rank of brigadier general in the U.S. Army.

== Biography ==
John Magruder was born on June 3, 1887, in Woodstock, Virginia. He attended Virginia Military Institute and graduated in 1909. He was commissioned a second lieutenant in infantry in 1910. He was transferred to the field artillery branch of the army in the next year.

During World War I, Magruder served with the 112th Field Artillery within the American Expeditionary Forces in France.

After the war Magruder was transferred to China, where he was appointed an assistant military attaché in Beijing. He served in this capacity until 1924, when he was assigned for study at Command and General Staff College at Fort Leavenworth, Kansas. After his graduation, Magruder was transferred back to Beijing, now in the new capacity of military attaché.

During World War II Magruder served in the Office of Strategic Services (OSS), as deputy director under the leadership of General William J. Donovan. After the war, the OSS was disbanded. Core elements of it, however, were maintained in the new Strategic Services Unit (SSU), located in the then Department of War. This newly formed SSU was led by Magruder.

The SSU was absorbed by the newly created Central Intelligence Group (CIG) on July 1, 1946, where it remained until the CIG was transitioned into the CIA.

Magruder played a formative role in the creation of the civilian Central Intelligence Agency (CIA) in 1947.

== Decorations ==
Army Distinguished Service Medal
World War I Victory Medal with four service stars
American Defense Service Medal
American Campaign Medal
Asiatic-Pacific Campaign Medal
European-African-Middle Eastern Campaign Medal
World War II Victory Medal

== Notes ==
Government offices
Preceded by William Donovan as Director of the Office of Strategic Services	Director of the Strategic Services Unit; 1945–1946	Succeeded by William W. Quinn
