= National Intelligence Authority =

Former American intelligence agency (1946–47)

The National Intelligence Authority (NIA) was the United States government authority responsible for monitoring the Central Intelligence Group (CIG), the successor intelligence agency of the Office of Strategic Services established by President Harry S. Truman's presidential directive of 22 January 1946 in the aftermath of World War II. The National Intelligence Authority and Central Intelligence Group were both replaced respectively by the National Security Council and the Central Intelligence Agency under the National Security Act of 1947, which was implemented on 18 September 1947.

== History ==
Despite opposition from the military establishment, the United States Department of State, and the Federal Bureau of Investigation (FBI), President Truman established the National Intelligence Authority on 22 January 1946. The National Intelligence Authority and its operational extension, the Central Intelligence Group (CIG), was disestablished after twenty months. The disestablishment of the NIA and CIG came with the National Security Act of 1947, which established the Central Intelligence Agency and the National Security Council.

== Membership ==
The NIA was composed of the secretary of state (James F. Byrnes and George C. Marshall), the secretary of war (Robert P. Patterson), the secretary of the Navy (James Forrestal), and a personal representative of President Truman (William D. Leahy, the chief of staff to the commander in chief). The board oversaw the activities of the CIG, which was headed by the director of central intelligence (DCI), who was a nonvoting member of the NIA. The first DCI was Sidney Souers.

== See also ==
- History of the Central Intelligence Agency
