= Sidney Souers =

American admiral and intelligence expert

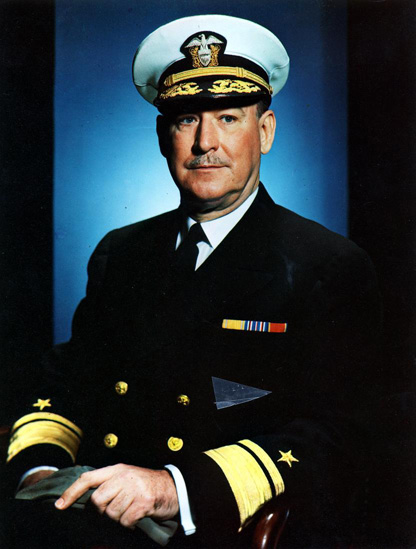

1st Director of Central Intelligence
- In office January 22, 1946 – June 10, 1946
- President: Harry S. Truman
- Deputy: Kingman Douglass
- Preceded by: Position established
- Succeeded by: Hoyt Vandenberg

Executive Secretary of the U.S. National Security Council
- In office July 26, 1947 – December 21, 1949
- President: Harry S. Truman
- Preceded by: William D. Leahy (President's Representative to the National Intelligence Authority)
- Succeeded by: James Lay

Personal details
- Born: March 30, 1892 Dayton, Ohio, U.S.
- Died: January 14, 1973 (aged 80) St. Louis, Missouri, U.S.
- Education: Purdue University, West Lafayette; Miami University (BA)
- Awards: Distinguished Service Medal

Military service
- Allegiance: United States
- Branch/service: United States Navy
- Years of service: 1929–1940 (reserve duty); 1940–1946 (active duty)
- Rank: Rear Admiral
- Commands: Sixth Naval District; Office of Naval Intelligence; Central Intelligence Group
- Battles/wars: World War II

Sidney William Souers (March 30, 1892 – January 14, 1973) was an American military intelligence officer who was the first person to hold the office of Director of Central Intelligence, being head of the Central Intelligence Group (CIG), the direct predecessor to the Central Intelligence Agency (CIA), and of the National Intelligence Authority (NIA), the direct predecessor to the National Security Council (NSC).

From 1947 to 1949, Souers also served as Executive Secretary of the U.S. National Security Council, and was a close and trusted advisor of President Harry S. Truman.

== Early life and education ==
Sidney Souers was born in Dayton, Ohio. He attended Purdue University and eventually Miami University, graduating from the latter in 1914 with a Bachelor of Arts. During his time at Miami, Souers was a member of the Kappa chapter of Delta Kappa Epsilon.

After completing his education, Souers was initially attracted to a business career. He was a founder and first president of the First Joint Stock Land Bank of Dayton, and also served as a high ranking business executive in New Orleans and later St. Louis for a number of notable companies, including Piggly Wiggly stores and Metropolitan Life Insurance. He was among the co-founders of American Airlines.

== Career ==
=== Navy career ===
Souers was called to active duty with the United States Navy on July 22, 1940, after serving eleven years in the naval reserves as an intelligence officer. Initially commissioned as a lieutenant commander, Souers was promoted to full commander in February 1942 when he was assigned to command the Sixth Naval District, headquartered at Naval Station Great Lakes in Chicago. In May 1943, after a German U-boat was sunk by the U.S. Coast Guard off the South Carolina coast, Souers, along with Royal Navy commander Patrick W. Stone, was tasked with the interrogation of the submarine's crew.

Souers was appointed assistant director of the Office of Naval Intelligence on July 24, 1944. He was promoted to rear admiral and deputy chief of Naval Intelligence on November 8, 1945. He was eventually relieved of active duty on July 22, 1946, after exactly six years of naval service.

=== Director of Central Intelligence ===
Sidney Souers was appointed member of a joint committee of State, War and Navy department employees in December 1944, chaired by Ferdinand Eberstadt and tasked with creating what would become known as the Eberstadt Report. In the report, Souers argued for the creation of a new central intelligence organization after the war that was to be under civilian as opposed to military control. By late 1945, Souers' proposal had come to the attention of president Harry S. Truman, who personally ordered Souers to send a memo to Secretary of the Navy James Forrestal on the president's approval of the proposition.

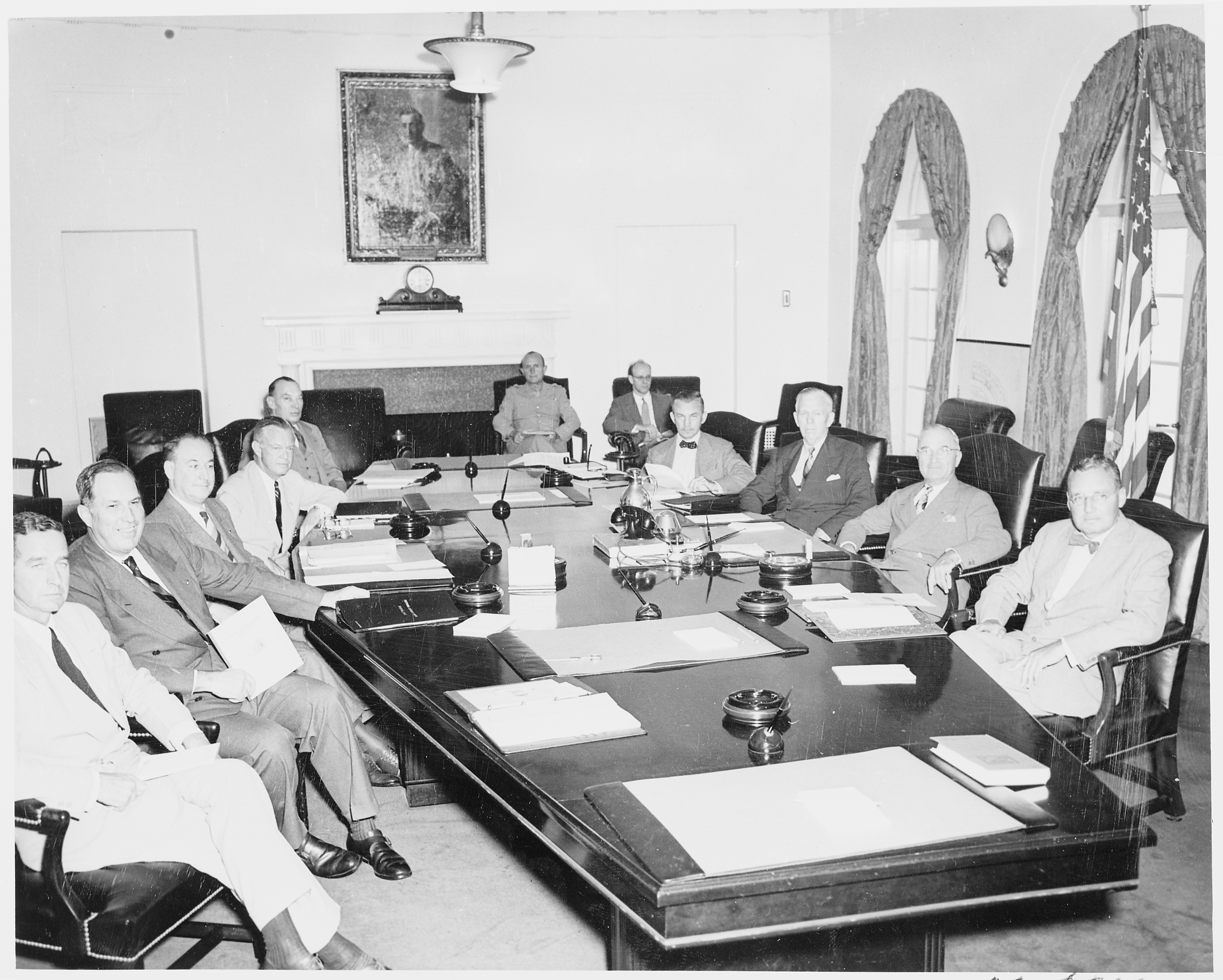
Souers (third from left) meeting with President Truman at a White House meeting of the National Security Council, August 19, 1948

On January 22, 1946, the National Intelligence Authority was officially established, with president Truman appointing Souers as director of its Central Intelligence Group (CIG). Souers agreed to serve as interim director until a permanent director could be appointed. Souers was initially tasked with giving daily intelligence briefings to president Truman on current developments in intelligence and national security. Despite being the inaugural holder of the office of Director of Central Intelligence, Souers was insistent on returning to his civilian business career, and was reluctantly relieved of his duties by president Truman on June 7, 1946 following the nomination of Hoyt Vandenberg as CIG director.

=== Later career ===
Souers was soon called back to Washington when president Truman appointed him to serve as Executive Secretary of the National Security Council following its creation on July 26, 1947. In this capacity as a non-voting member, he met with the president daily as a personal informant on national security issues and planning. He was the first to brief Truman on the possible existence of a thermonuclear weapon, and remained a key figure in its development, being a major proponent of the establishment of an intelligence division within the Atomic Energy Commission. In March 1949, following the retirement of Truman's Chief of Staff, Fleet Admiral William D. Leahy, Souers was selected to fill Leahy's duties of advising the president on national defense. Souers resigned from his position as Executive Secretary on December 21, 1949, though remained Truman's chief consultant on national security until the end of his presidency in 1953.

Souers was awarded the Distinguished Service Medal by president Truman on December 2, 1952, for "keen foresight and tireless efforts toward fulfillment of a strong and effective security program".

== Death and legacy ==
Souers died at his home in St. Louis on January 15, 1973, aged 80. Following his death, Miami University created the Admiral Sidney Souers Distinguished Alumni Award in 1977 at the bequest of his widow, Sylvia Nettle.

Government offices
New office	Director of Central Intelligence; 1946	Succeeded by Hoyt Vandenberg
