= Ryszard Kukliński =

Polish colonel and spy (1930–2004)

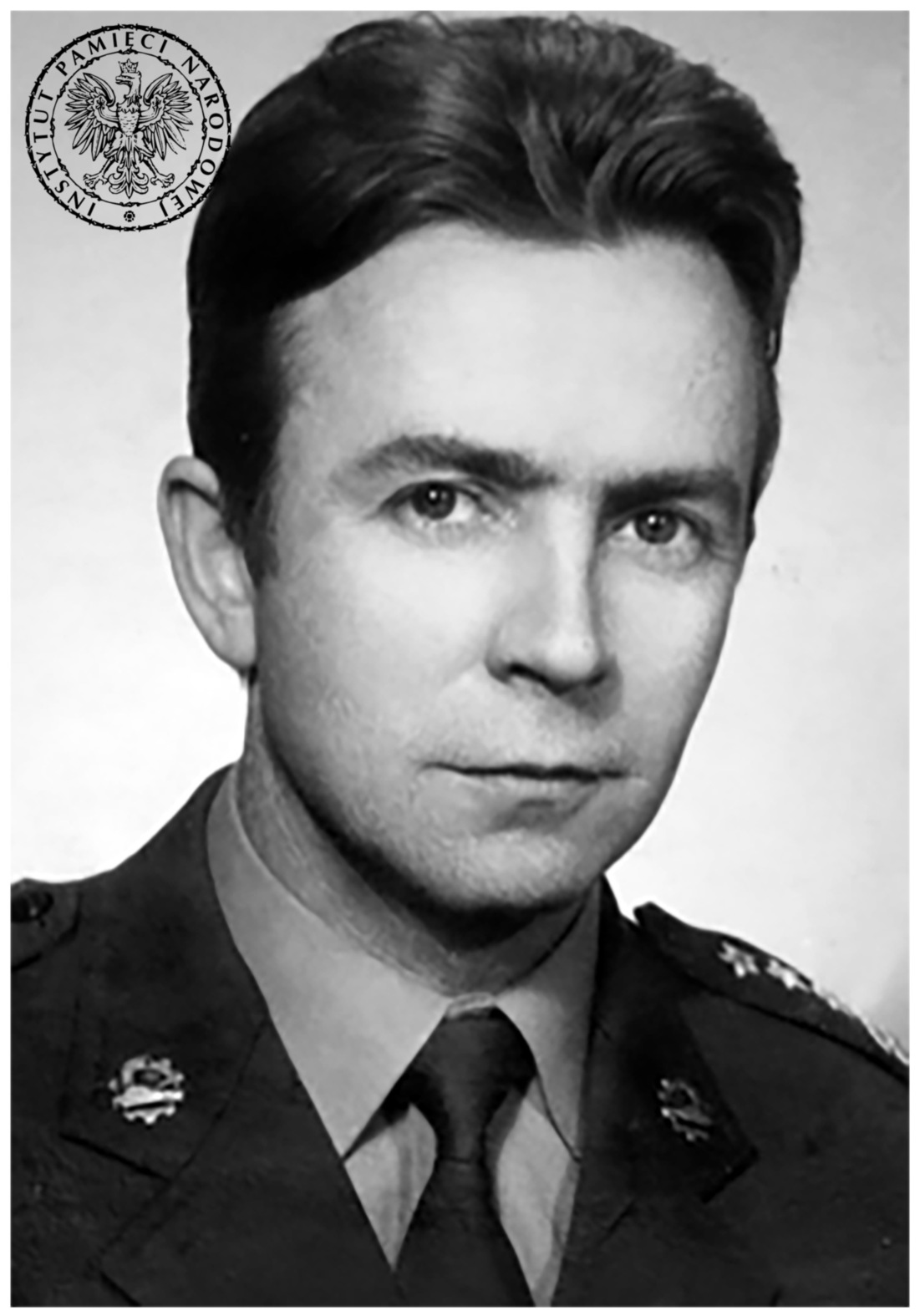
- Ryszard Kukliński, 1972 photograph
- Born: Ryszard Jerzy Kukliński; June 13, 1930; Warsaw, Poland
- Died: February 11, 2004 (aged 73); Tampa, Florida, U.S.
- Military career
- Allegiance: Poland
- Branch: Polish People's Army
- Rank: Colonel

Ryszard Jerzy Kukliński (June 13, 1930 – February 11, 2004) was a Polish Army colonel and Cold War spy for NATO (CIA codename Jack Strong). He was posthumously promoted to brigadier general by Polish President Andrzej Duda.

Between 1972 and 1981 Kukliński passed top-secret Soviet documents to the CIA, including Soviet plans for the invasion of Western Europe.

Former United States National Security Advisor Zbigniew Brzeziński described him as "the first Polish officer in NATO."

== Biography ==
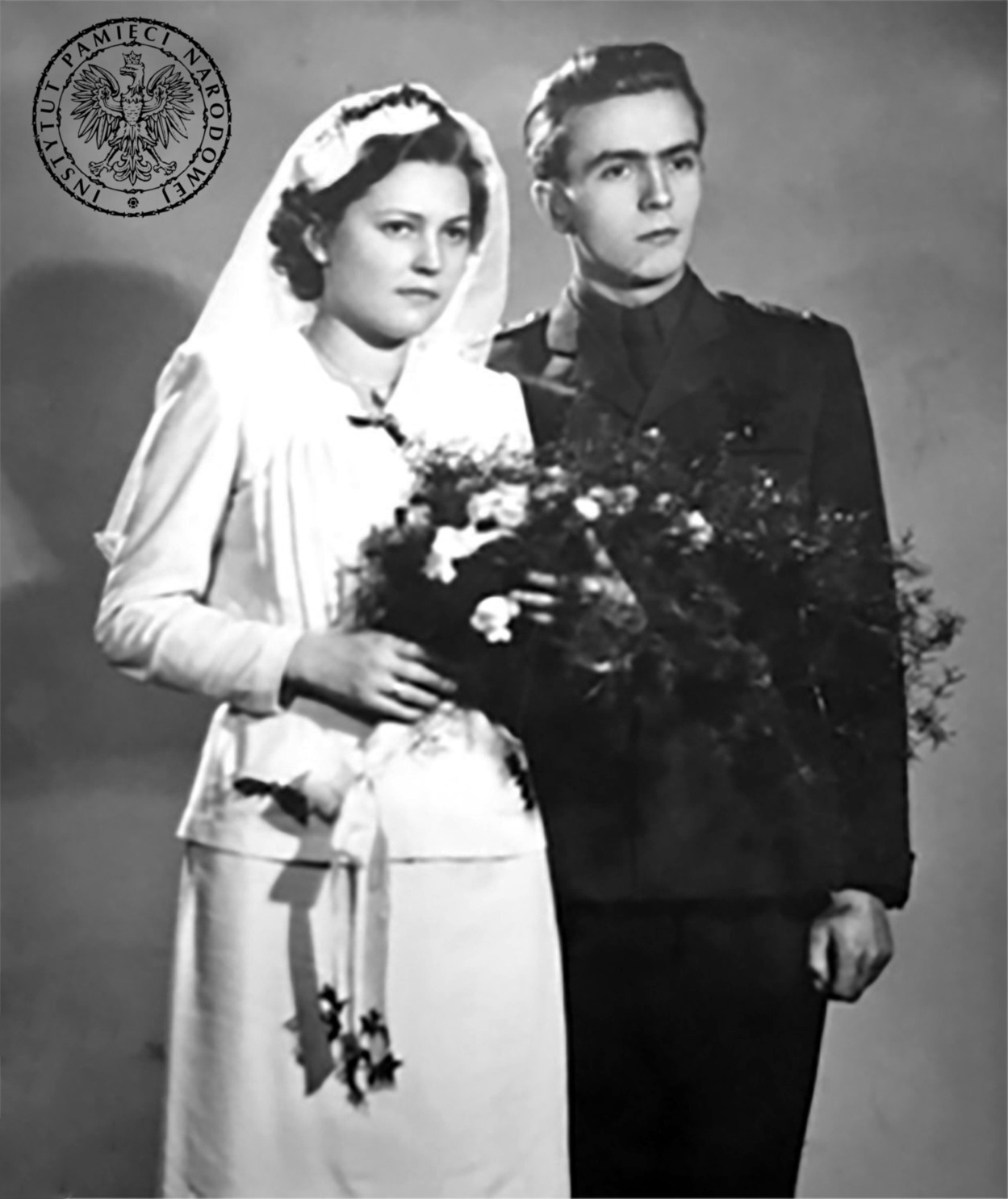
Ryszard Kukliński with his wife

Kukliński was born in Warsaw to a working-class family with strong Catholic and socialist traditions. During World War II, his father became a member of the Polish resistance movement; he was captured by the Gestapo, and subsequently died in the Sachsenhausen concentration camp. After the war, Kukliński began a successful career in the Polish People's Army. In 1964, he began work in Polish espionage and counterintelligence operations. In 1968, he took part in preparations for the Warsaw Pact's invasion of Czechoslovakia. Disturbed by the invasion, and by the brutal crushing of the parallel Polish 1970 protests, in 1972, Kukliński sent a letter to the US embassy in Bonn describing himself as an army officer from a Communist country and requesting a secret meeting.

In 1994, Kukliński said that his awareness of the "unambiguously offensive" nature of Soviet military plans was an important factor in his decision to communicate the details of those plans to the United States, adding that "Our front could only be a sacrifice of Polish blood at the altar of the Red Empire". Kukliński was also concerned that his homeland would be turned into a nuclear wasteland as the Warsaw Pact's superiority in conventional forces would mean NATO would respond to military action with tactical nuclear weapons.

Between 1972 and 1981, he passed 35,000 pages of mostly Soviet secret documents to the CIA. The documents described Moscow's strategic plans regarding the use of nuclear weapons, technical data about the T-72 tank and 9K31 Strela-1 missiles, the whereabouts of Soviet anti-aircraft bases in Poland and East Germany, the methods used by the Soviets to avoid spy satellite detection of their military hardware, plans for the imposition of martial law in Poland, and many other matters.

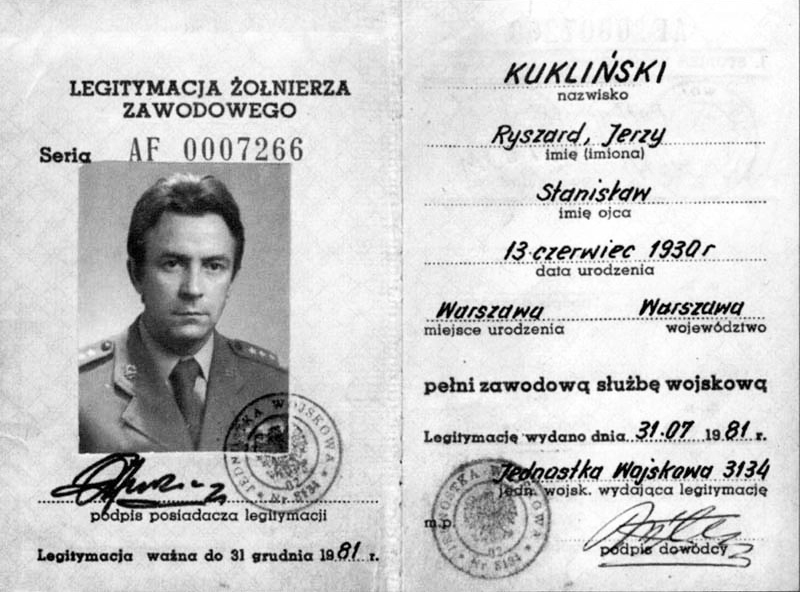
Last army ID of Colonel Kukliński

He was the first foreign recipient of the Distinguished Intelligence Medal.

=== Escape to the United States ===
Facing imminent danger of discovery from a denunciation by a secret Communist collaborator known only by his alias "Prorok", Kukliński, his wife and two sons were spirited out of Poland by the CIA shortly before the imposition of martial law in December 1981. Though Kukliński and his family successfully defected, his past may have followed him to the United States as both of his sons later died in separate incidents. The older, Waldemar, was run over by a truck without a licence plate in August 1994 on the grounds of an American university. It has been suggested that his younger son, Bogdan Kukliński, drowned on December 31, 1993, when his yacht capsized on a quiet sea. The weekly "Wprost" however suggests in a 2009 issue, citing three independent and undisclosed sources, that the younger son, Bogdan, is probably still alive under the witness protection program. According to the author of the article, Leszek Szymowski, he was not murdered by the KGB. Ryszard Kukliński did not claim that they were assassinated, but never rejected such a possibility either.

On May 23, 1984, Kukliński was sentenced to death, in absentia, by a military court in Warsaw. After the fall of communism, the sentence was changed to 25 years. In 1995, the court revoked the sentence and said that Kukliński was acting under special circumstances and Kukliński visited Poland again in April 1998.

=== Death ===
Kukliński died from a stroke at the age of 73 in Tampa, Florida, February 11, 2004. His funeral mass was held at Fort Myer with CIA honors on March 30, 2004. His remains were transported to Poland and on June 19, 2004, Kukliński was buried in the row of honour in the Powązki Military Cemetery in Warsaw, Poland, along with the remains of his son Waldemar.

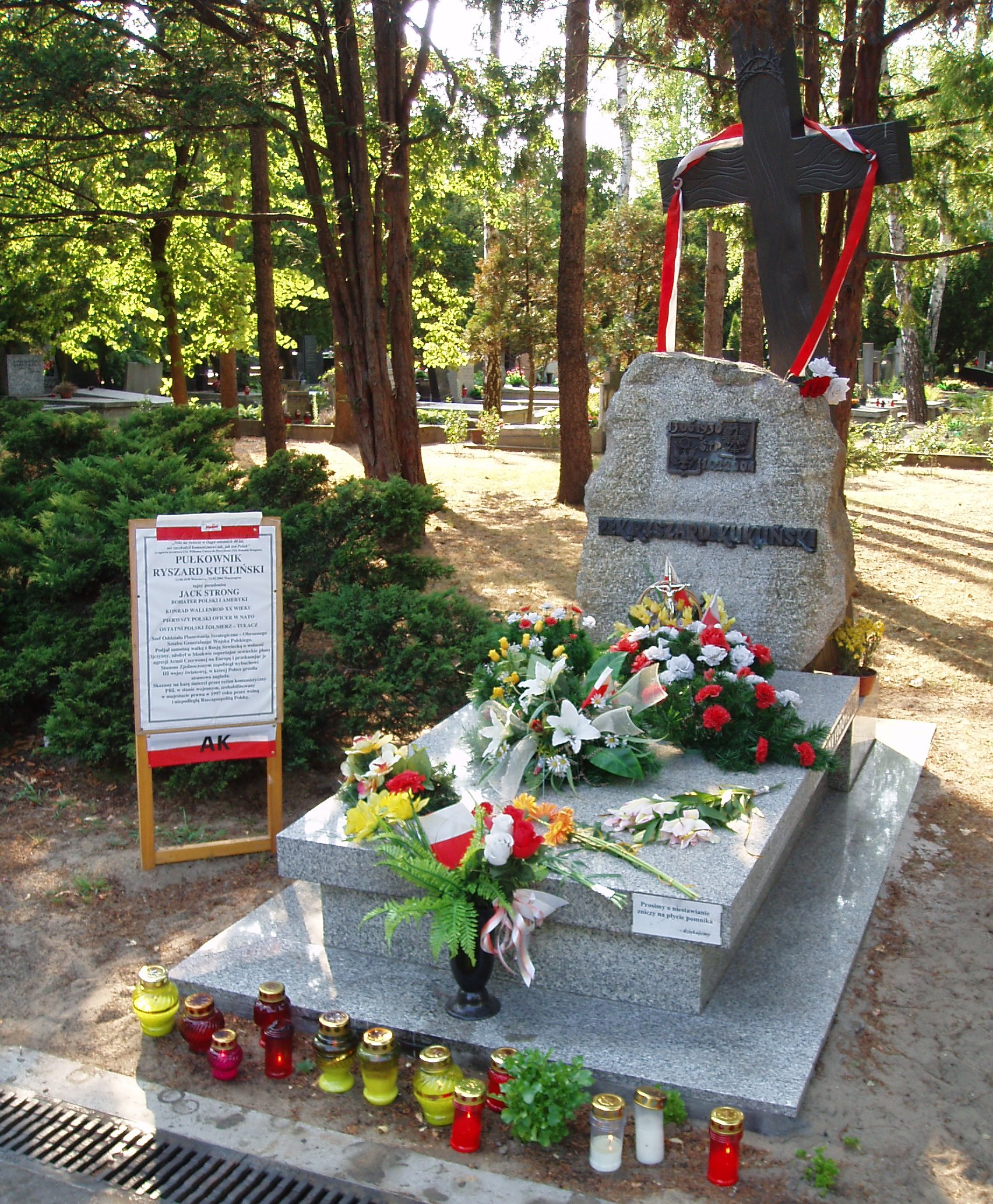
Colonel's Kukliński's grave at the honour row of the Powązki Military Cemetery in Warsaw

== Legacy ==
In June 1986, a spokesman for the Soviet-backed Jaruzelski regime, Jerzy Urban, revealed Kukliński's existence to the world in order to make the argument that the Reagan administration had been informed by Kukliński of the plans to install martial law but had betrayed the Solidarity movement by not passing that information on to its "friends" in Solidarity. When the journal Kultura interviewed Kukliński, he said that planning for martial law had begun in late 1980 and that the Jaruzelski group planned to crush Solidarity regardless of the outcome of negotiations with the trade union and the Polish church. He also rejected the regime's claim that declaring martial law was an internal decision by describing how the Soviets had applied pressure on Polish authorities to impose martial law. When asked whether Jaruzelski was a hero or a traitor, Kukliński replied:

My view has been consistently that in Poland there existed a real chance to avoid both Soviet intervention and martial law. Had he, together with Stanislaw Kania, proved capable of greater dignity and strength, had they honestly adhered to the existing social agreements, instead of knuckling under to Moscow, present-day Poland would undoubtedly look completely different.

Kukliński was the chief of a military strategic command planning division of the Polish army. He was very familiar with the layout of the Polish forces within the Warsaw Pact. While details of the general plans for the Warsaw Pact forces were known only in Moscow, Kukliński could infer much from his contacts at the Moscow high command headquarters.

According to President Carter's national security advisor, Zbigniew Brzeziński, "Kukliński's information permitted us to make counterplans to disrupt command-and-control facilities rather than only relying on a massive counterattack on forward positions, which would have hit Poland."

In January 2013, Władysław Pasikowski began shooting a movie about Ryszard Kukliński. With Marcin Dorociński in the lead role, the script for Jack Strong (title taken from Kukliński's CIA secret-agent pseudonym), written by director Pasikowski, is based on new material from the Polish Institute of National Remembrance archives, CIA operating documents and statements by eyewitnesses including David Forden, the former CIA operations officer who was the liaison with Colonel Kukliński.

== Opinions in Poland ==
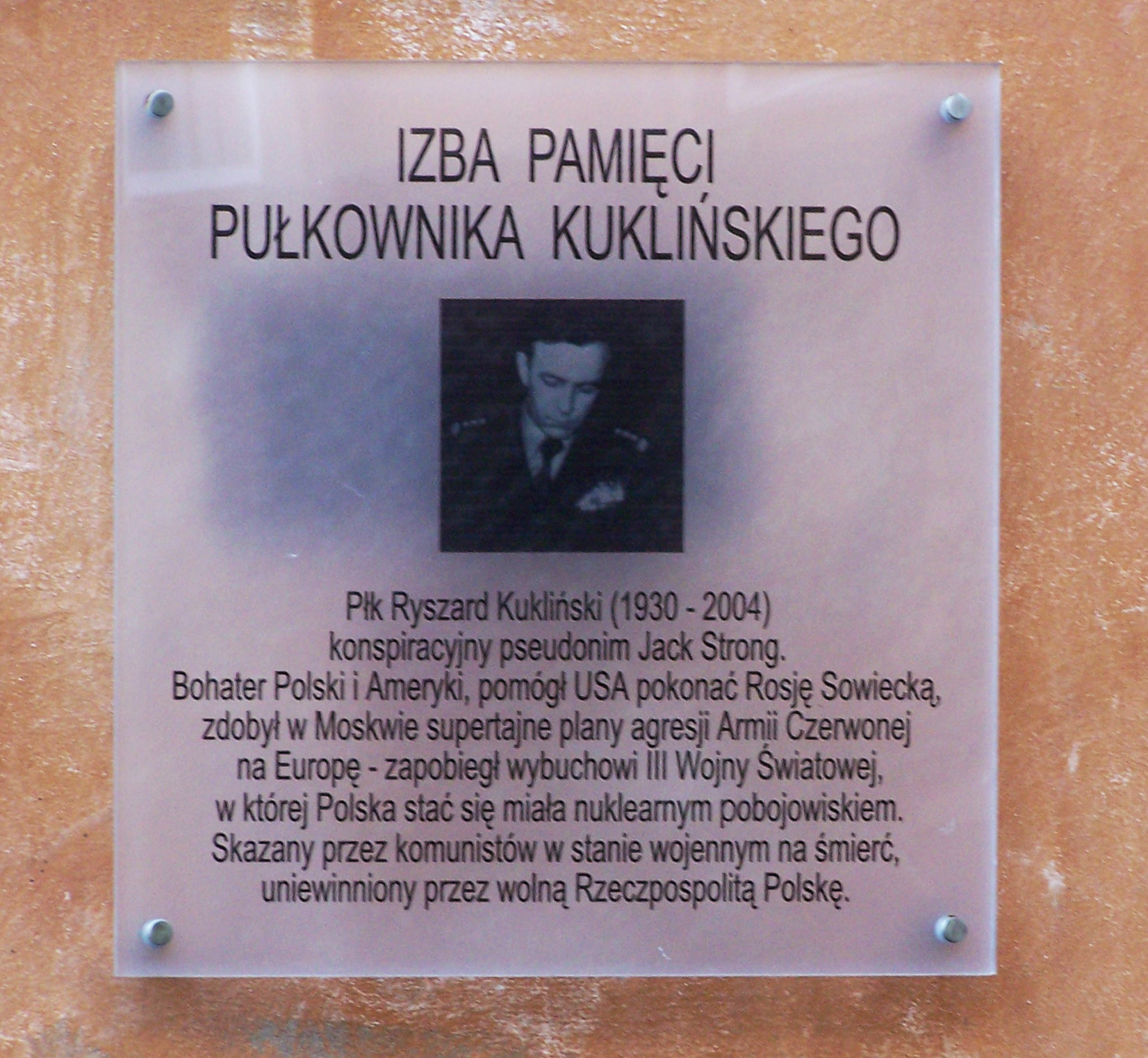
A placard with a dedication to Ryszard Kukliński in Warsaw.

During his term as Poland's first freely elected president, a Solidarity leader, Lech Wałęsa, refused to pardon Kukliński.

The administration of US President Clinton nonetheless took the stance that it would oppose Polish membership in NATO unless Kukliński were exonerated.

When all charges were dropped against Kukliński in 1997, the left-leaning Trybuna lamented that "Colonel Ryszard Kukliński—a spy, deserter, and traitor—has been turned into a model of virtue and a national hero of the rightists." In a 1997 survey conducted by the CBOS, 27 percent of Poles considered Kukliński a hero and 24 percent a traitor (compared to 12 and 24 percent, respectively, in 1992).

According to some historians, it was possible that Kukliński was a double agent, of the Soviet GRU, used in an operational game with the CIA. A Polish Minister of Internal Affairs during communist times, Czesław Kiszczak, revealed such a theory in a later interview, while a former Soviet military attaché, Yuriy Rylyov, claimed so directly in an interview. Historians like Paweł Wieczorkiewicz and Franciszek Puchała (a general in the Polish Army during communist times) suggest that the knowledge Kukliński had was exaggerated, and while he had a lot of information about the Polish Army and the organization of the Warsaw Pact in general, he could not have had detailed information on Soviet plans, since no one in Poland had it. Puchała supported his opinion in official hearings of Kukliński by Polish prosecutors during his revised trial. Revealing plans about the enforcement of martial law in Poland, which would make a Soviet invasion unnecessary, could have been profitable for the Soviet side, ensuring that the US would not be surprised by martial law and would not undertake unpredictable actions against the Soviets. It is noteworthy, that despite Kukliński's revelations, the US did not warn Solidarity about martial law. The Soviets took the escape of such an important spy nonchalantly and did not demand any consequences from the Polish politician responsible for intelligence, namely Czesław Kiszczak. Also, the matter of Kukliński's sons' deaths is unclear and they may have been part of a protection program; besides, according to Wieczorkiewicz, such revenge on a defector's family would be quite unusual for Soviet intelligence.

Kukliński is buried in the row of honour in the Powązki Military Cemetery in Warsaw, and he has been given honorary citizenship of several Polish cities, including Kraków and Gdańsk. The Polish political group Centrum (at the time headed by Zbigniew Religa) requested in 2004 that the President of Poland posthumously promote Kukliński to the rank of general.

Since its unveiling in 2006, his monument in Kraków had been vandalized three times. The first instance was on December 13, 2011 (the anniversary of martial law in Poland), and the second on February 11, 2012 (the anniversary of Kukliński's death); in both cases, terms such as "traitor", the CIA's name (crossed out) and "Death to the USA" were sprayed. On February 11, 2014, his statue was found splashed with brown paint or oil.

== See also ==
- List of Eastern Bloc defectors
- List of Poles
- Marian Zacharski
