= CA-95 =

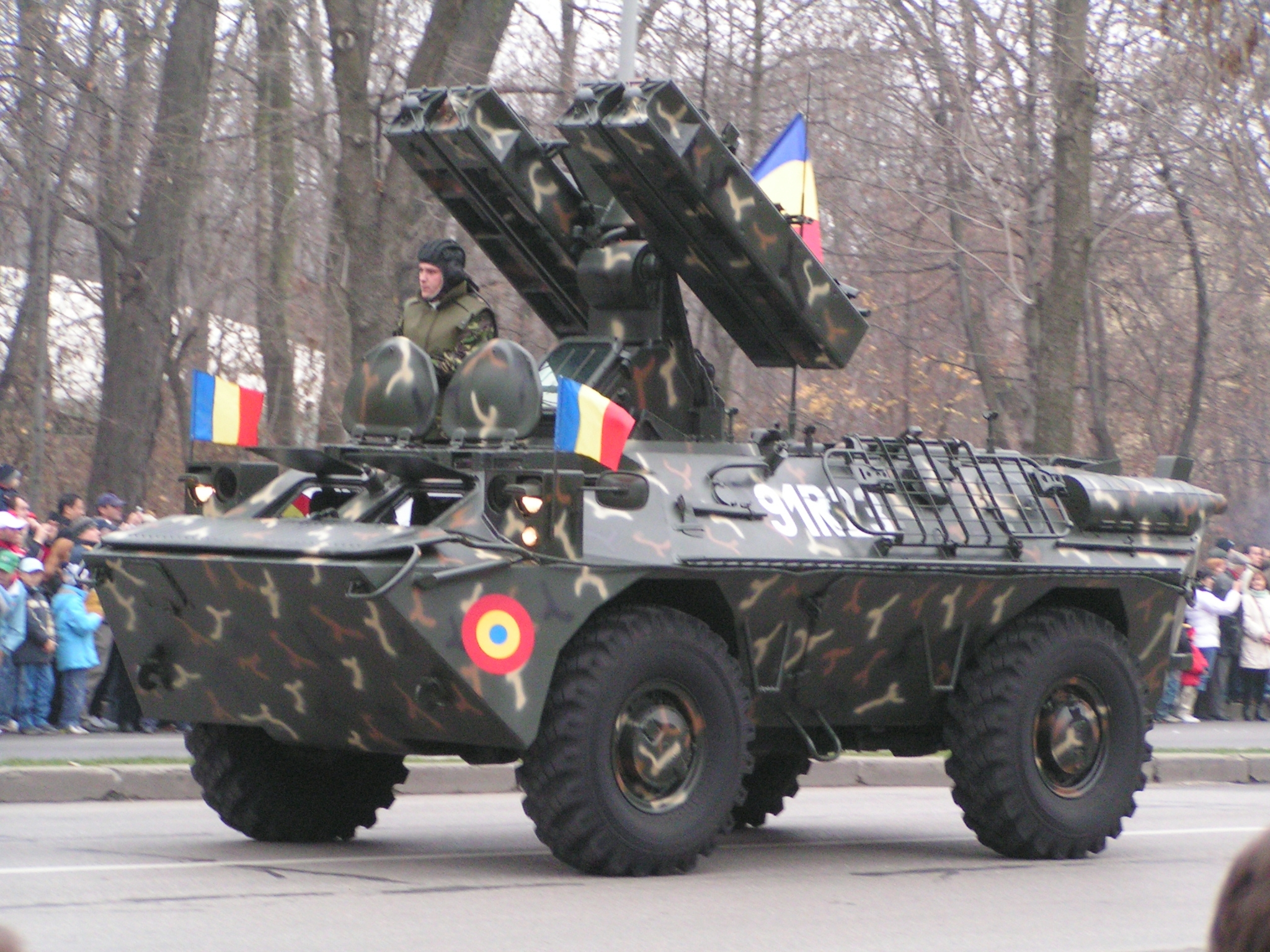
- CA-95M1
- Type: Vehicle-mounted SAM system
- Place of origin: Romania

Service history
- Used by: Romanian Land Forces; Armed Forces of Ukraine
- Wars: Russian invasion of Ukraine

Specifications
- Mass: 7 tonnes
- Length: 5,75 m
- Width: 2,35 m
- Height: 2,5 m
- Crew: 4
- Armor: against 7.62mm rounds & shrapnel
- Main armament: 4X surface to air missiles +2 spares
- Secondary armament: 7.62mm PKT machine gun
- Engine: gasoline 140 hp (104 kW)
- Power/weight: 20 hp/tonne
- Suspension: wheeled 4x4
- Operational range: 700 km
- Maximum speed: 90 km/h

The CA-95 is a highly mobile, short range, low altitude Romanian native-made amphibious, infra-red guided surface-to-air missile system, currently in service with the Romanian Land Forces. The CA-95 is the Romanian variant of the Soviet 9K31 Strela-1 system. It can carry four infrared-guided surface to air missiles and has a firing range of approximately 4.2 km. Each TEL consists of two pairs of ready-to-fire missiles, mounted in boxes on either side of a turret on a TAB-79 amphibious vehicle. It can engage targets flying between 50 and 3,500 meters.

In 2025, CA-95 systems have been seen in use with the Armed Forces of Ukraine.

== Gallery ==
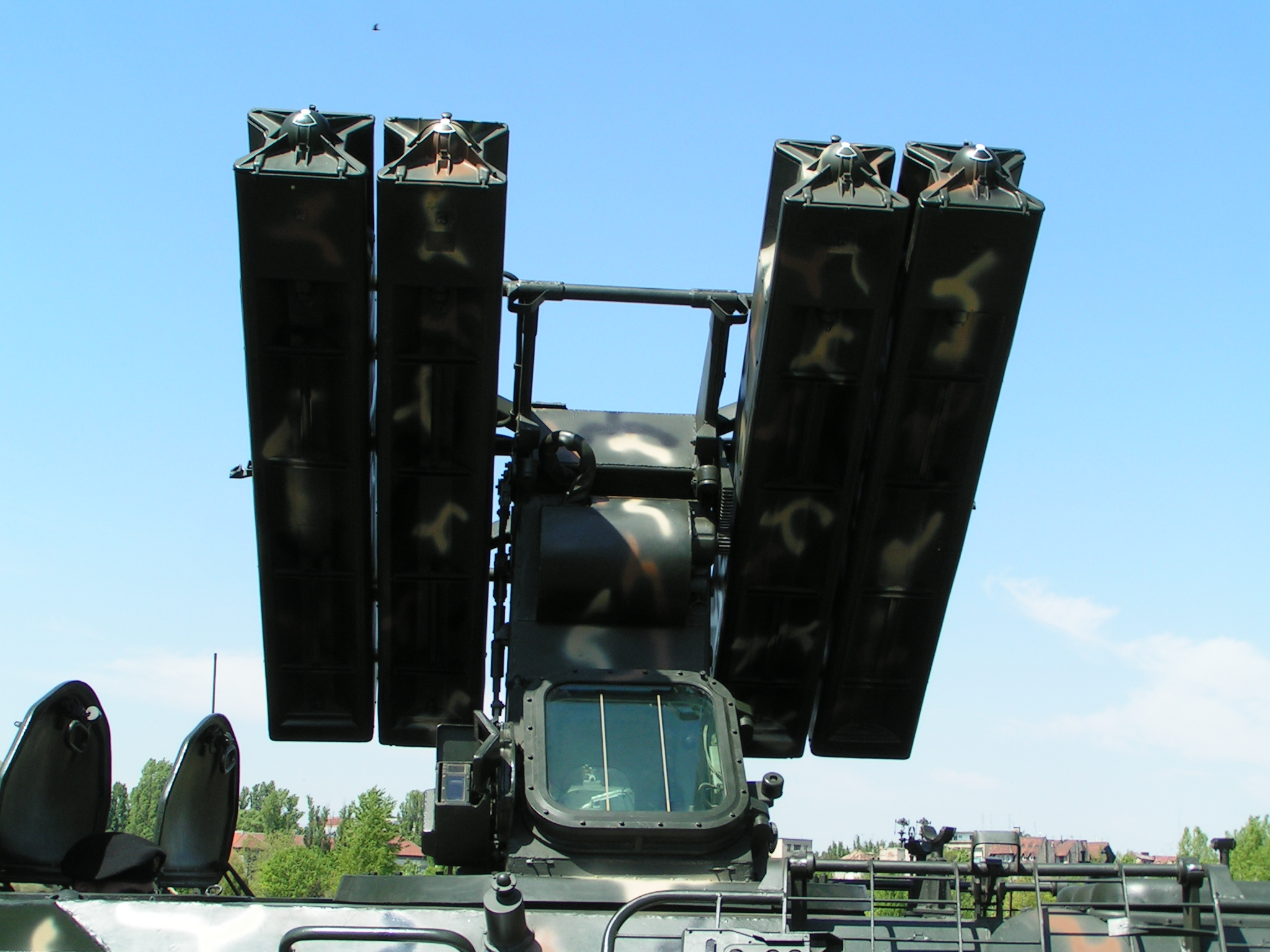
CA-95M1, The AA missiles pods

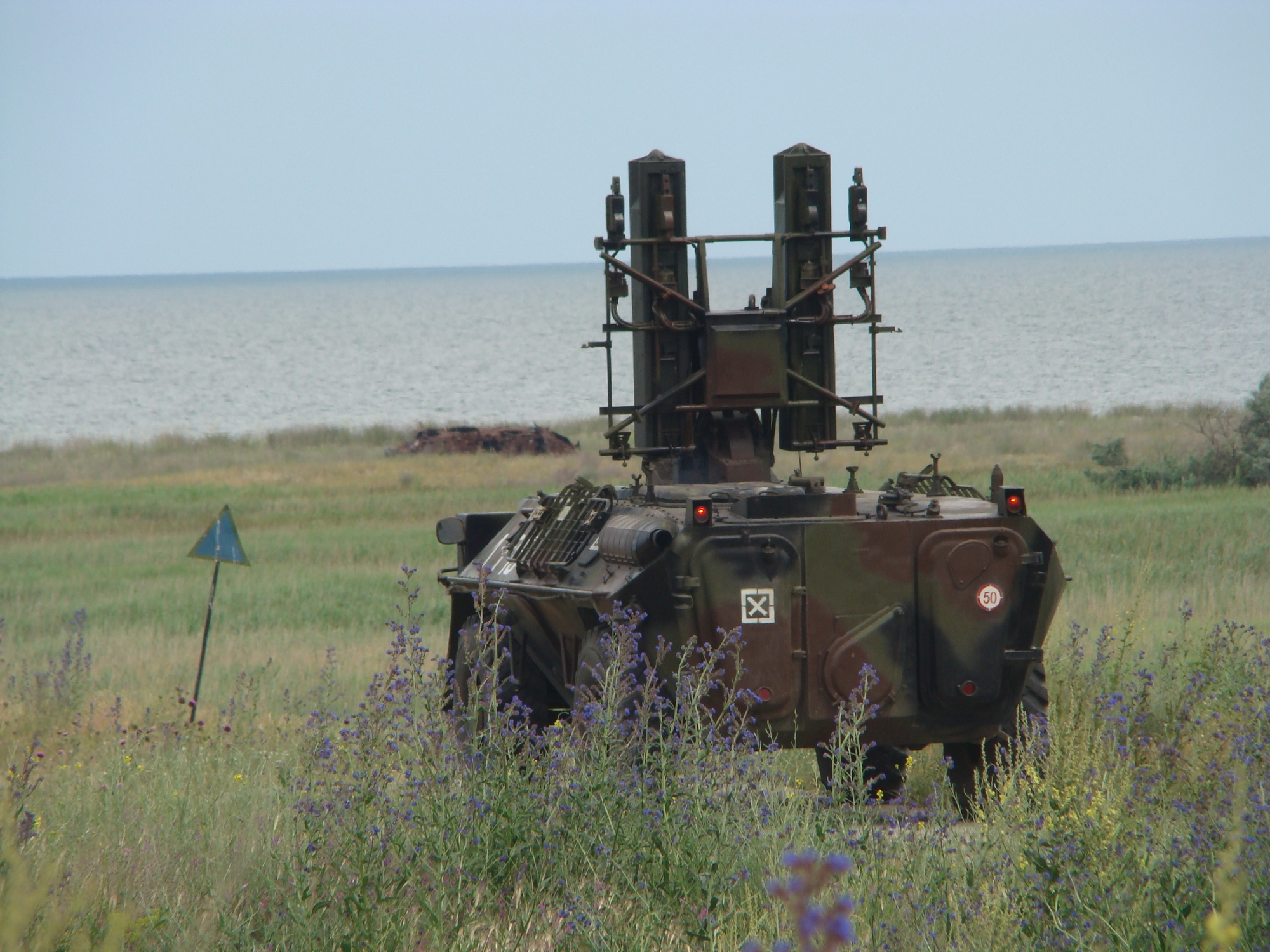
CA-95 at Capu Midia firing range

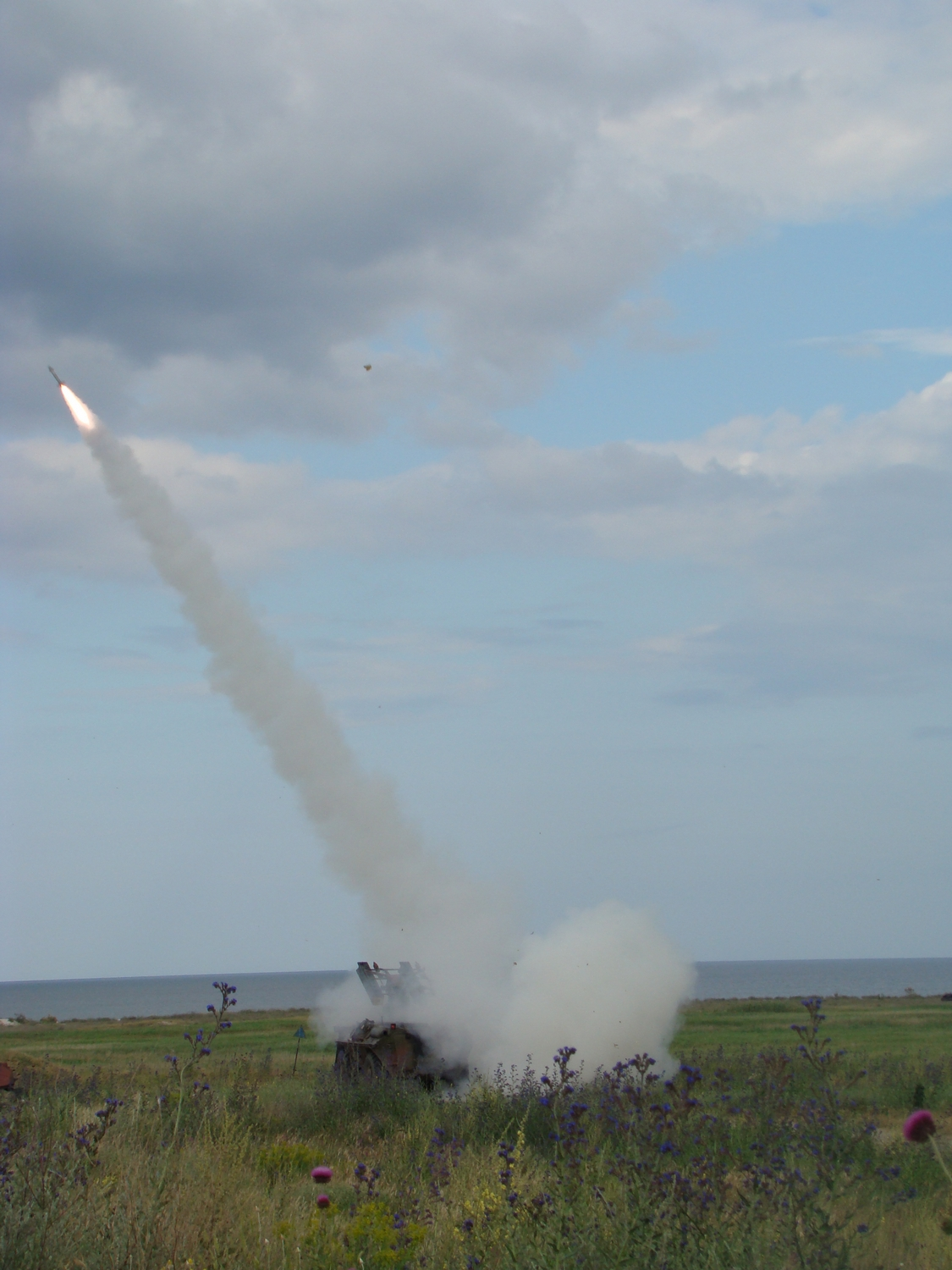
Military exercise with CA-95

== See also ==
- 9K31 Strela-1
- List of surface-to-air missiles
