= Jack Strong (film) =

- Theatrical release poster
- Directed by: Władysław Pasikowski
- Written by: Władysław Pasikowski
- Produced by: Sylwia Wilkos; Klaudiusz Frydrych; Roman Gutek
- Starring: Marcin Dorociński; Maja Ostaszewska; Dagmara Dominczyk; Patrick Wilson
- Cinematography: Magdalena Górka
- Edited by: Jarosław Kamiński
- Music by: Jan Duszynski
- Production company: Scorpio Studio
- Distributed by: ITI Cinema; Level 33 Entertainment
- Release date: 7 February 2014 (Poland)
- Country: Poland
- Languages: Polish; English; Russian
- Box office: $ 7 002 827

Jack Strong is a 2014 Polish political thriller film directed by Władysław Pasikowski, starring Marcin Dorociński, Maja Ostaszewska, Dagmara Dominczyk and Patrick Wilson. The film is based on the true story of Ryszard Kukliński, a Polish People's Army colonel who spied for the American Central Intelligence Agency during the height of the Cold War.

== Cast ==
- Marcin Dorociński as Ryszard Kukliński
- Maja Ostaszewska as Hania Kuklińska, Ryszard's wife
- Piotr Nerlewski as Bogdan Kukliński, son of Hanna and Ryszard
- Józef Pawłowski as Waldemar Kukliński, son of Hanna and Ryszard
- Patrick Wilson as David Forden, CIA Operations Officer
- Dagmara Domińczyk as Sue, CIA Operative
- Oleg Maslennikov as Viktor Kulikov, Marshal of the Soviet Union
- Ilja Zmiejew as general Szernienko
- Mirosław Baka as major Putek
- Krzysztof Globisz as General Florian Siwicki, Polish People's Army
- Paweł Małaszyński as Dariusz Ostaszewski
- Dimitri Bilov as Sasha Ivanov
- Krzysztof Pieczyński as Zbigniew Brzeziński, United States National Security Advisor
- Paweł Iwanicki as Walczak
- Zbigniew Zamachowski as colonel Gendera
- Ireneusz Czop as Marian Rakowiecki
- Piotr Grabowski (born 1972) as agent of counterintelligence
- Krzysztof Dracz as General Wojciech Jaruzelski, Polish People's Army
- Eduard Bezrodniy as Oleg Penkovsky
- Antoni Barłowski as Kowalik
- Michalina Olszańska as Iza

== Filming ==
Photography started in January 2013. The film was shot in the offices of the General Staff of the Polish Armed Forces and in Warsaw, Gdańsk, Legnica, Washington D.C. and Moscow.

== Release ==
The film was released in Poland on February 7, 2014. The film was released in the United Kingdom and in Ireland on February 14, 2014. The film was released in the United States on July 24, 2015, in a limited release and through video on demand by Level 33 Entertainment.
