= Ilja Zmiejew =

Ilja Zmiejev
- Илья Змеев
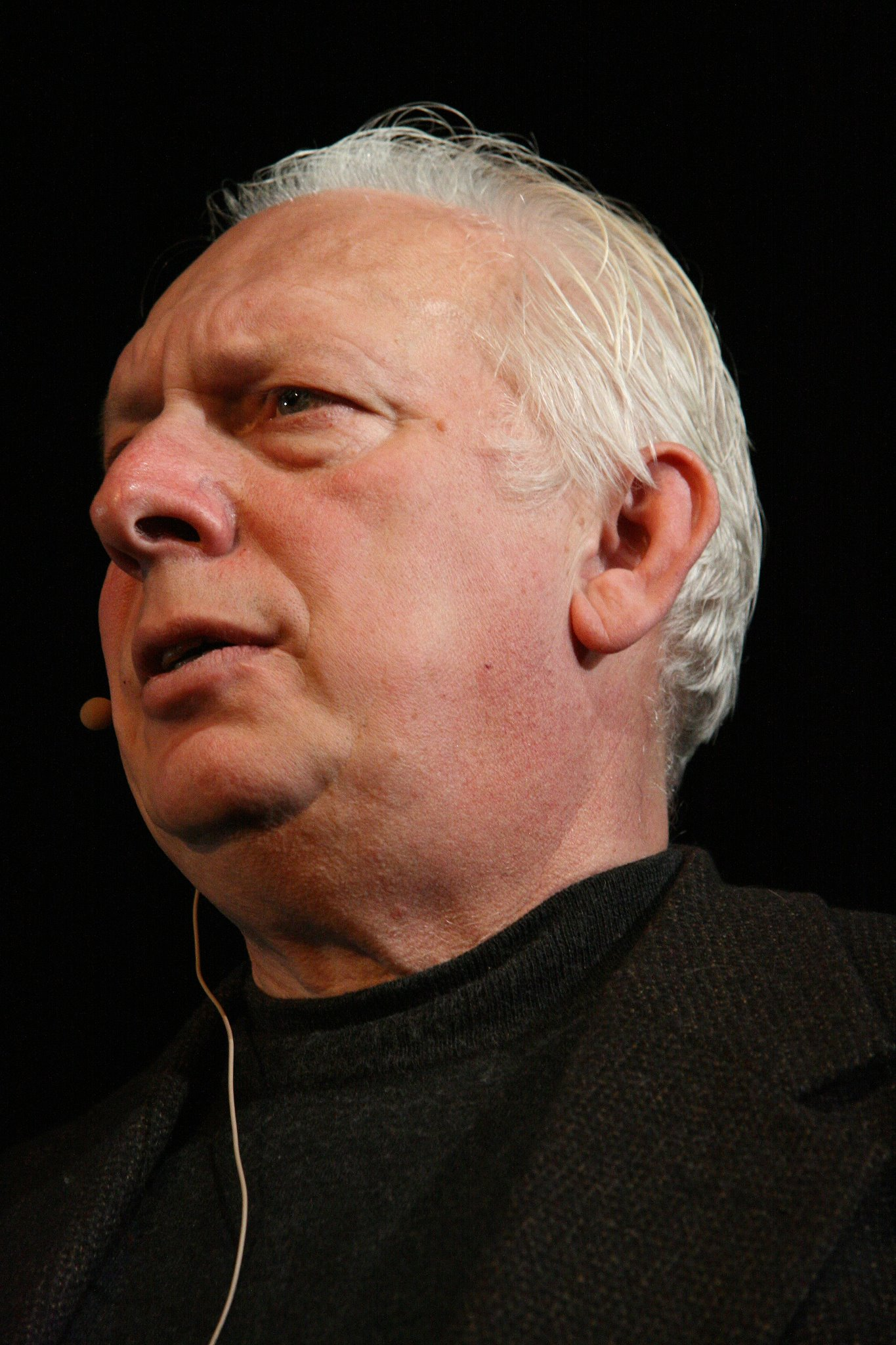
- Born: 5 April 1955 (age 71); Kazan, USSR
- Occupations: actor, voice-over artist
- Website: http://zmiejew.pl/

Ilja Zmiejev (Russian: Илья Змеев, Polish: Ilja Zmiejew; born 5 April 1955, Kazan, USSR) is a Russian and Polish actor, voice-over artist and a former radio host. He has appeared in more than 70 films, mostly by Polish film studios.

== Biography ==
Ilja Zmiejev started his career in show business as a master of ceremonies at Perm Philharmonia after graduating from the School of Performance in Moscow in 1983.

From 1989 until 1991 he worked as a radio host at Avtoradio in Perm. In 1991 he moved with his family to Warsaw, Poland, where he lives to this day.

In Poland Ilja started his acting career, having since appeared in more than 60 films and TV series, including Lapa (1991), Psy 2: Ostatnia krew (1994), Róża (2011), Katyń (2007) and Jack Strong (2014). He has also performed in theatres. Until 2013 Ilja Zmiejev worked as a radio host for the Polish Radio Russian service.

Apart from his acting Ilja Zmiejev is known for his voice-over work He recorded a number of TV and Internet commercials, including the Russian ads for IKEA and Mastercard. He also records audio books of Russian classics such as the Master and Margarita and Eugene Onegin.

== Filmography ==
Year	Title	Role	Notes				
2016	Smoleńsk						
2014	Fotograf	Father of Natasza					
2014	Jack Strong	Generał Szernienko					
2013	Syberiada polska	NKVD Officer					
2012	Igor i żurawie	Garin					
2011	1920 Bitwa Warszawska	Mówca na wiecu czerwonoarmistów					
2011	Ojciec Mateusz (TV Series)	Siergiej Selezniow	Powrót Piotra (2011) ... Siergiej Selezniow				
2011	Róża	NKWD Capitain					
2011	Zimowa córka	Kapitän					
2011	Weekend	Russian					
2010	Różyczka	Ambassador					
2008	Na dobre i na zle (TV Series)	Michail Tirtow	Chaos w Lesnej Górze (2008) ... Michail Tirtow				
2008	Jermołowy (Ермоловы)	Konoplicz					
2007	Katyń	Lt. Kozlov					
2000–2006	Plebania (TV Series)	Igor Borun	Odcinek 723 (2006) ... Igor Borun; Odcinek 720 (2006) ... Igor Borun; Odcinek 714 (2006) ... Igor Borun; Odcinek 713 (2006) ... Igor Borun; Odcinki 45-55 ... Igor Boruń; Odcinek 17 (2000) ... Igor Borun; Odcinek 3 (2000) ... Igor Borun	2005	Timewatch (TV Series documentary)	Bulganin	Who Killed Stalin? (2005) ... Bulganin
2003	Bao-bab, czyli zielono mi (TV Mini-Series)		Point G (2003)				
2002	Julia wraca do domu	Russian Priest					
2002	Yyyreek!!! Kosmiczna nominacja	Sierioza					
2000	Syzyfowe prace	Gubernator					
2000	Pozegnanie	Ruppi (uncredited)					
1999	Moja Angelika	Gangster					
1999	Na koniec swiata	Soldier					
1998	U Pana Boga za piecem	Bus Driver					
1998	Prostytutki	Caviar seller					
1997	Szczesliwego Nowego Jorku	Russian					
1997	Love Stories	Russian consulary clerk					
1996	Król olch	Russian Officer					
1996	Horror w Wesolych Bagniskach	Russian Soldier					
1995	Pułkownik Kwiatkowski	Karolev - Soviet officer in Hotel 'Polonia'					
1994	Psy 2: Ostatnia krew	Styopa					
1992	Pierscionek z orlem w koronie	Soviet guard					
1991	Lapa	Psychiatrist					

== Family ==
Ilja is married and has two daughters.
