= David Forden =

American intelligence officer (1930–2019)

David Warner Forden (September 11, 1930 – February 12, 2019) was an American spy and operations officer for the Central Intelligence Agency (CIA). He helped Ryszard Kukliński, a colonel in the Polish People's Army, pass along sensitive information on nations in the Warsaw Pact to the United States.

Forden had an ongoing three-year assignment in Mexico City, in 1973. He was assigned by the CIA to Warsaw as a station chief. He returned to CIA headquarters in Langley, Virginia as the chief of the Soviet-Eastern European division.

After Ryszard Kukliński, a colonel on the general staff of the Polish People's Army who also served as a liaison with the Soviet Union, reached out to the United States, Forden, who was fluent in Polish, was assigned from 1973 through 1981. As a result, the United States learned of the Soviet Union's intention to invade Poland and the Polish governments intention to declare martial law in order to end the Solidarity movement. Through diplomatic pressure and covert funding, the United States prevented these outcomes. In the 1980s, Forden was assigned to Athens as a station chief. Forden retired in 1988, and received the Distinguished Intelligence Medal.

His interactions with Kukliński were portrayed by Patrick Wilson in the 2015 Polish film Jack Strong.

Forden died on February 12, 2019, in Alexandria, Virginia, from Alzheimer's disease. It was not until 2021 that his remains were moved to Arlington National Cemetery.
