= ABC-79M =

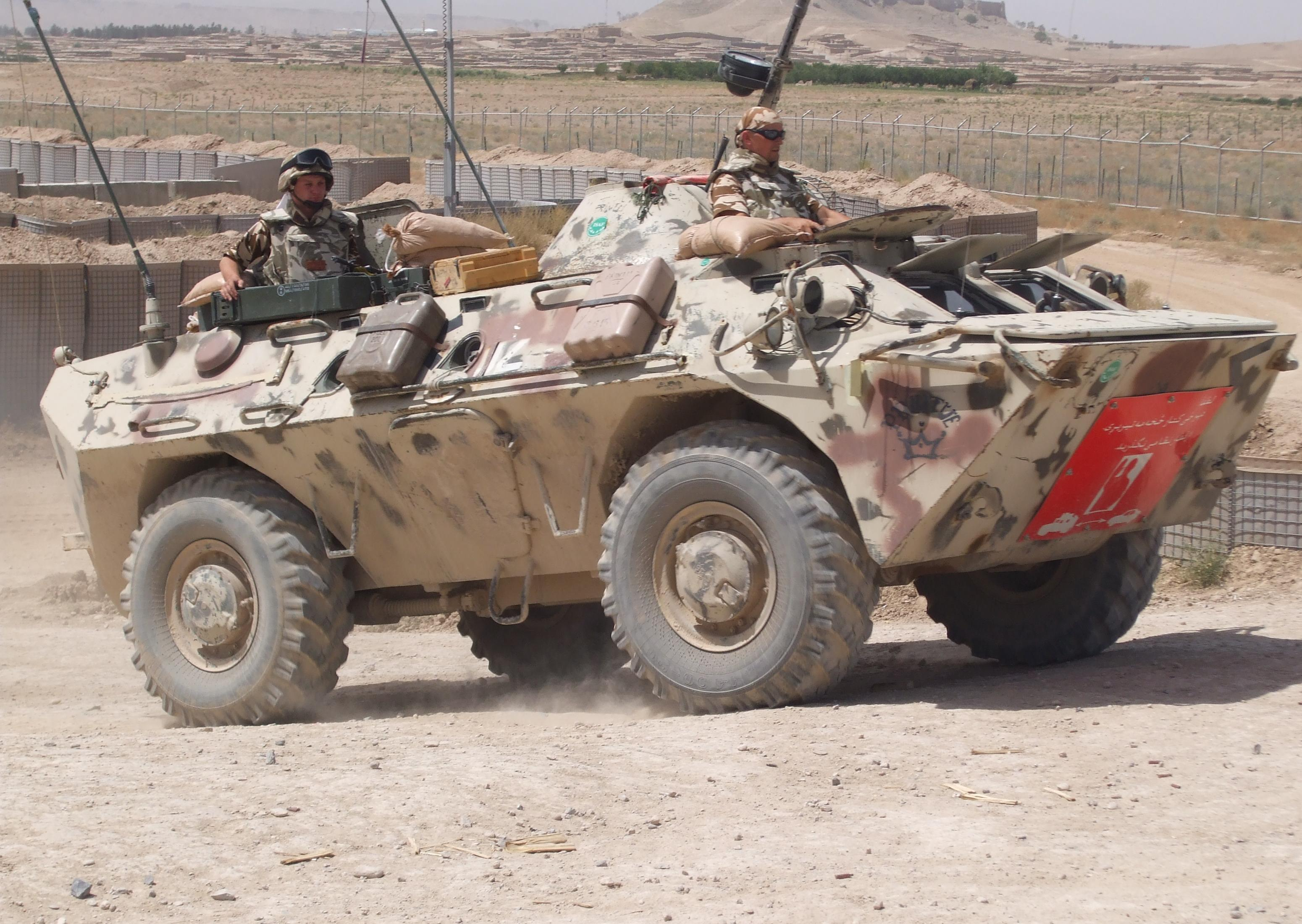
- TABC-79 in Afghanistan
- Type: Reconnaissance vehicle and armored personnel carrier
- Place of origin: Romania

Production history
- No. built: 430

Specifications
- Mass: 9,27 tonnes
- Length: 5,64 m
- Width: 2,80 m
- Height: 2,34 m
- Crew: 3+4
- Main armament: 1 × 14,5mm KPVT Machine gun 500 rounds
- Secondary armament: 1 × 7,62mm PKT Machine gun 2000 rounds
- Engine: Diesel Type 798.05N2
- Suspension: 4×4
- Operational range: 700 km
- Maximum speed: 80 km/h

The ABC-79M (4x4) (Romanian: amfibiu blindat pentru cercetare) armoured personnel carrier (APC) has been developed in Romania and uses some automotive components of the TAB-77 (8 × 8) APC. Although previously known as TABC-79 (transportorul blindat pentru cercetare), it is now known as the ABC-79M.

The ABC-79M is a simplified version of the earlier TAB-77 8x8 armored personnel carrier, which was itself a Romanian version of the BTR-70. Both vehicles share several common components.

The ABC-79M is fully amphibious, and is equipped with a single water-jet for propulsion. Other equipment includes infrared night-vision equipment, winch with 50m of cable and capacity of 5,500 kilograms, and central tire pressure regulation. It is also equipped with an engine preheater, to allow the engine to start in severe cold.

It is equipped for nuclear, chemical, and biological warfare and features a 14.5mm KPVT heavy machine gun with 500 rounds of ammunition as primary armament. This is supplemented by a lighter 7.62mm machine gun with 2,000 rounds of ammunition on board. Both weapons are located in a small one-man turret which is identical to the turret of the TAB-77 and the earlier TAB-71M.

Production is now complete, and the vehicle is no longer available for foreign or domestic sale. It is in used only by the second line units of the Romanian military, and there have been no export orders other than a single vehicle purchased by Israel in 1994. No Israeli order followed the trials.

== Variants ==
Variants include:

- TAB-C reconnaissance vehicle
- AM-425 armored personnel carrier
- TAB-79A PCOMA artillery observation vehicle
- TAB-79AR mortar carrier
- ML-A95M vehicle used for the CA-95M self-propelled anti-aircraft weapon

== Gallery ==
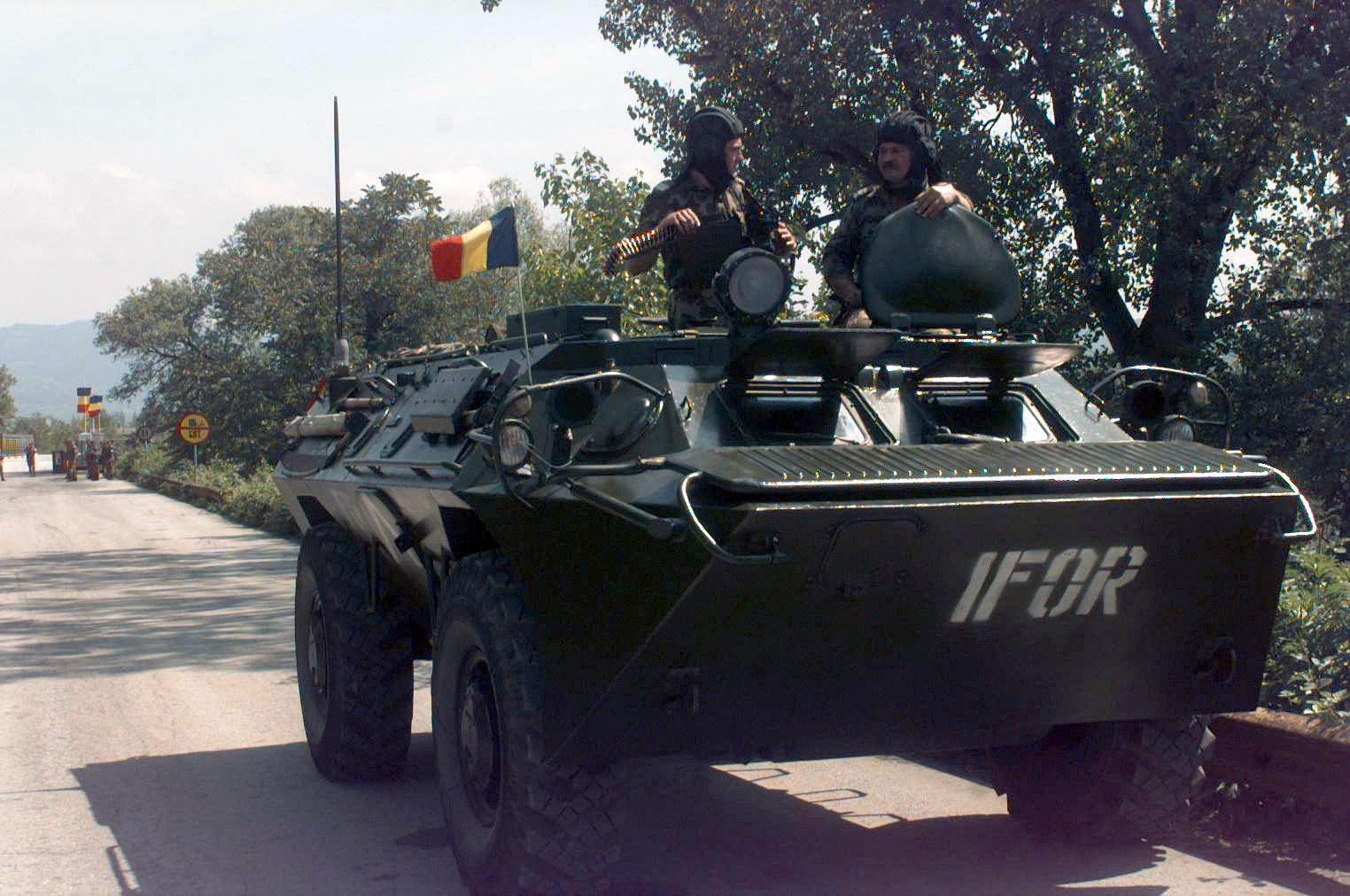
TABC-79 in Bosnia during the Operation Joint Endeavor.

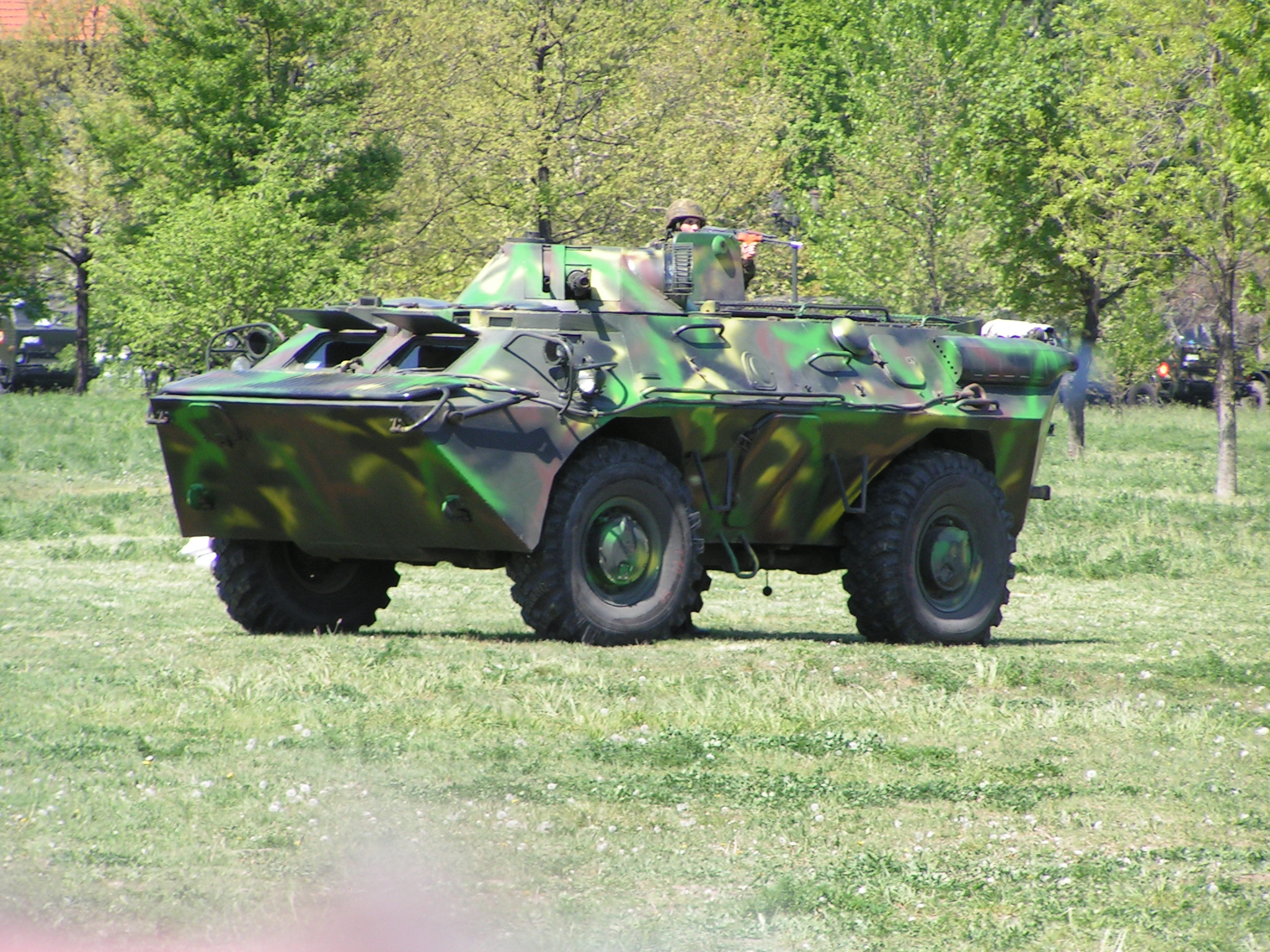
TABC-79 at the Land Forces Day 2007 military demonstration.

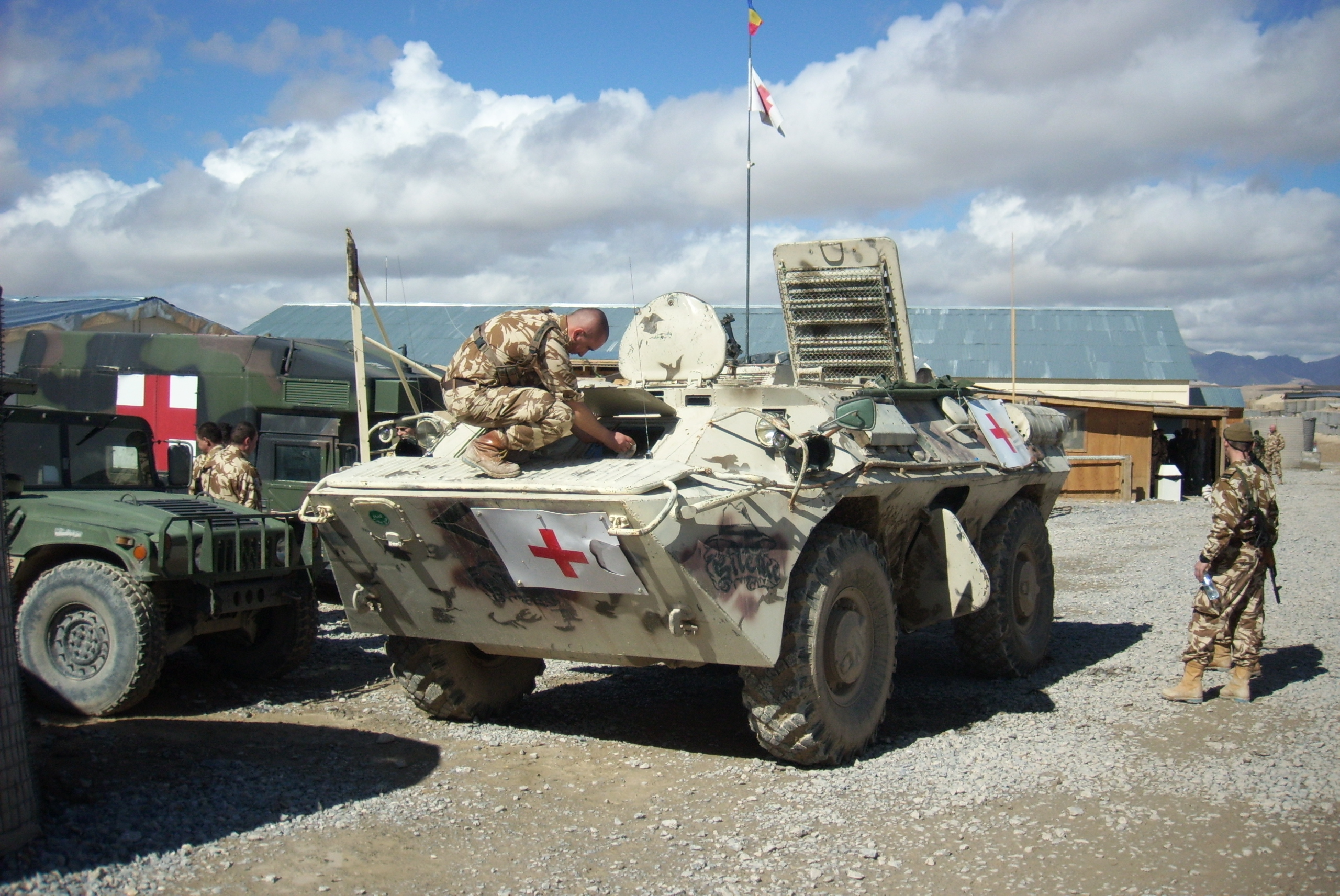
MEDEVAC version of the TABC-79 in Afghanistan.

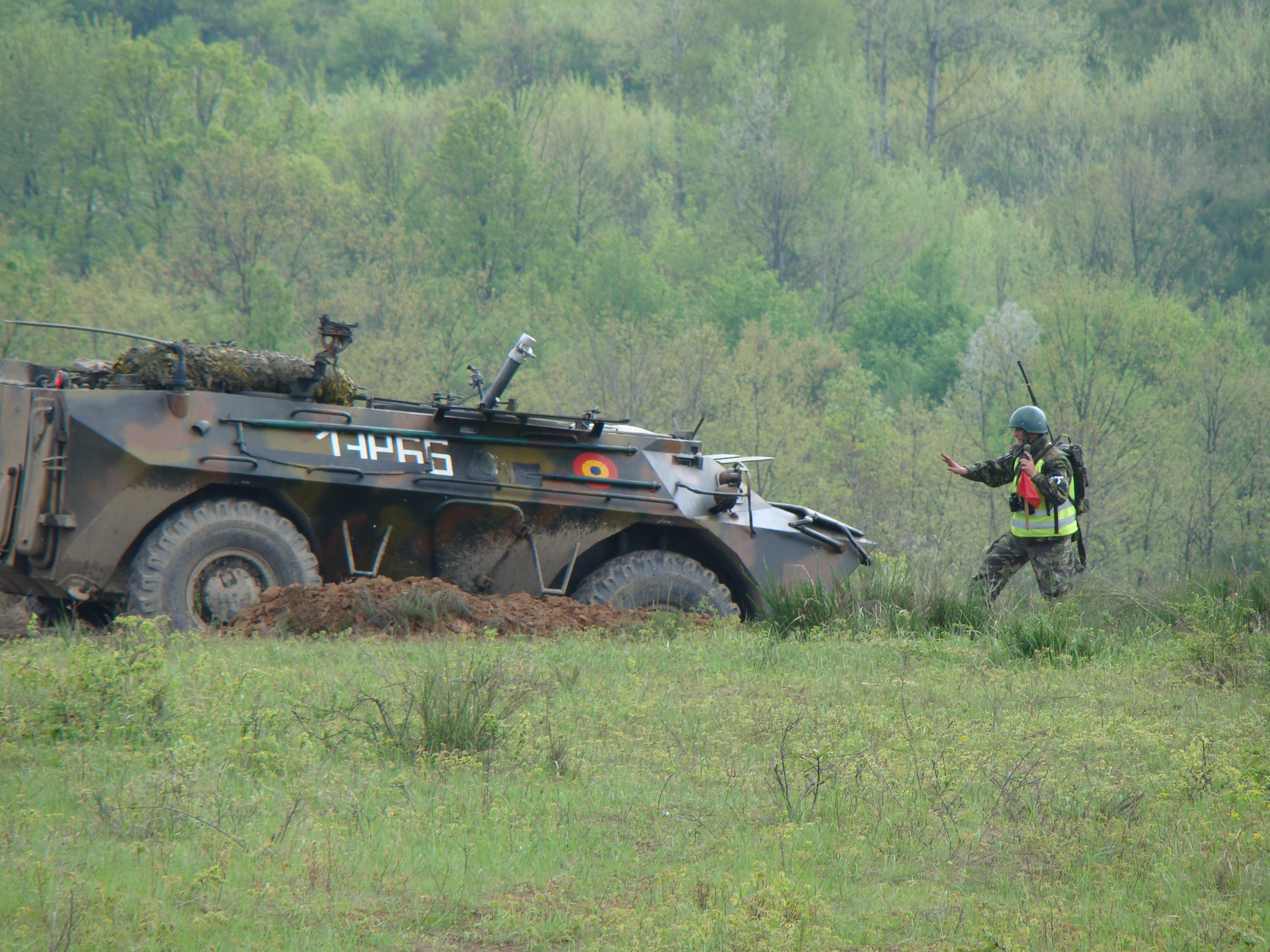
TABC-79AR mortar carrier during a military exercise.
