= 9K31 Strela-1 =

9K31 Strela-1 (NATO reporting name: SA-9 Gaskin)
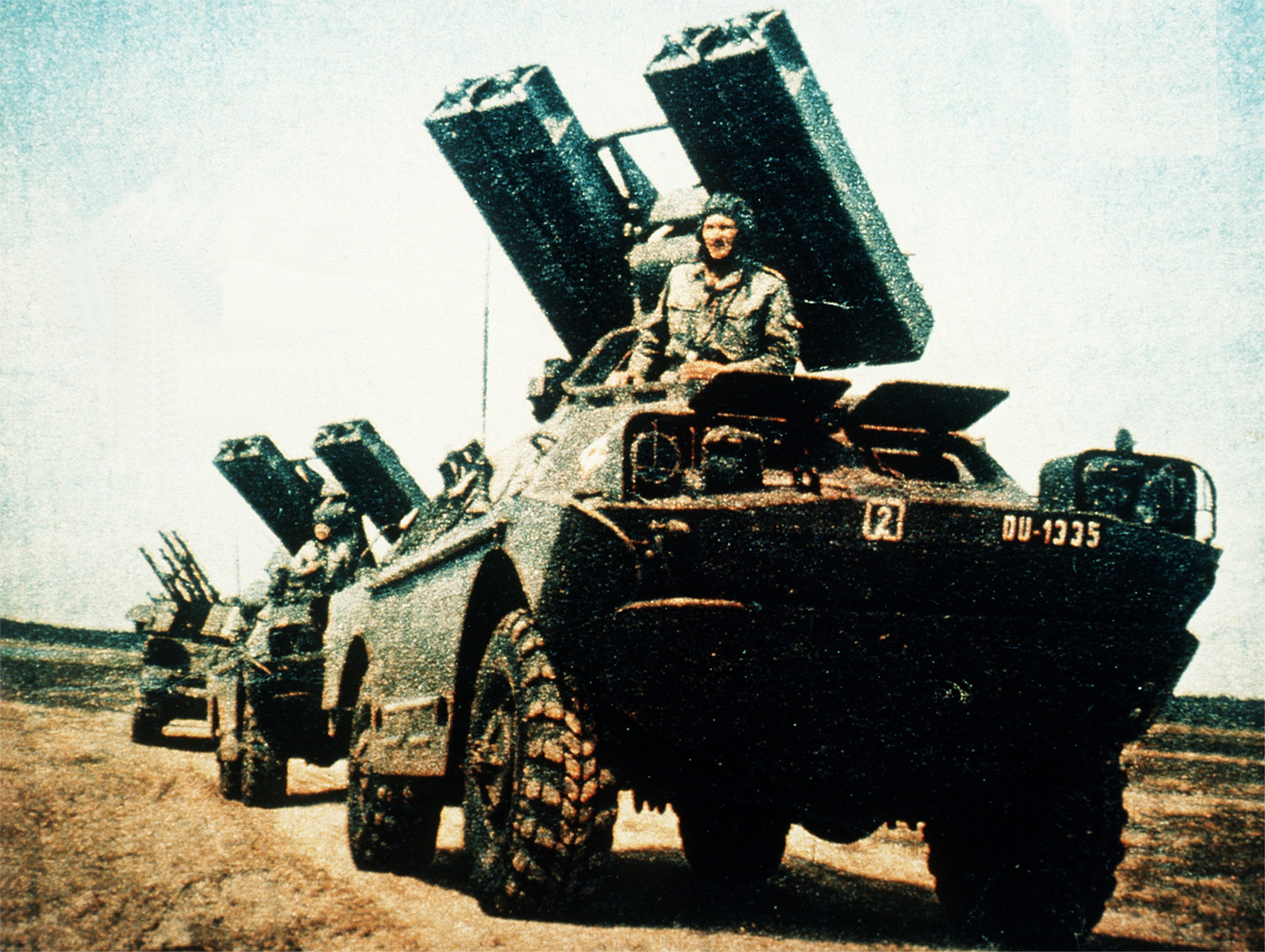
- 9K31 transporter erector launcher
- Type: Vehicle-mounted SAM system
- Place of origin: Soviet Union

Service history
- In service: 1968–present
- Used by: See list of operators
- Wars: Arab–Israeli wars Western Sahara War; South African Border War; Lebanon wars Iran–Iraq War; Gulf War; Yugoslav wars 2003 invasion of Iraq Russian invasion of Ukraine; Syrian Civil War; Yemeni Civil War (2014–present)

Production history
- Designer: OKB-16 design bureau (now the Moscow-based KB Tochmash Design Bureau of Precision Engineering)
- Manufacturer: Soviet state factories
- Produced: 1966
- Variants: 9K31, CA-95

Specifications (9K31 Strela-1)
- Mass: 7,000 kg (15,000 lb)
- Length: 5.8 m (19 ft)
- Width: 2.4 m (7.9 ft)
- Height: 2.3 m (7.5 ft) (travelling)
- Crew: 3 (commander, gunner and driver)
- Armour: 5–14 mm (0.20–0.55 in)
- Main armament: 4 × 9M31 (or 9M31M)
- Engine: GAZ 41 V-8 water-cooled petrol 140 hp at 3,400 rpm
- Power/weight: 20 hp/t (15 kW/t)
- Ground clearance: 0.43 m (1.4 ft)
- Fuel capacity: 290 litres (77 US gal)
- Operational range: 750 km (470 mi)
- Maximum speed: 100 km/h (62 mph) (road); 10 km/h (6.2 mph) (water)
- Guidance system: infrared homing

The 9K31 Strela-1 (Russian: 9К31 «Стрела-1»; English: arrow) is a highly mobile, short-range, low altitude infra-red guided surface-to-air missile system. Originally developed by the Soviet Union under the GRAU designation 9K31, it is commonly known by its NATO reporting name, SA-9 "Gaskin". The system consists of a BRDM-2 amphibious vehicle, mounting two pairs of ready-to-fire 9M31 missiles.

== Development history ==
The missiles used in this system were developed alongside the ubiquitous Soviet MANPADS 9K32M "Strela-2" (NATO designation SA-7 "Grail") in the 1960s. At first, both missiles were intended to be man-portable systems, but as it became obvious that the Strela-2 would be far more compact, the development goals of Strela-1 were changed. Instead of a battalion-level man-portable system the new criteria called for a regimental vehicle-mounted SAM to support the ZSU-23-4.

As a result of the change in role and more relaxed weight limits of a vehicle-mounted SAM, the design team made the 9M31 a much heavier missile, which permitted fewer design compromises than in the case of Strela-2 to achieve acceptable kinematic performance. The most notable difference is the much larger diameter of the missile and a blunt seeker head spanning the full width of the missile. With all else being equal, the ability of an optical seeker to detect a target is directly proportional to its diameter, but on the other hand aerodynamic drag increases proportionally to the square of the diameter.

The Strela-1 also had a warhead more than twice as heavy as the Strela-2, a proximity fuze, and more effective control surface configuration to provide better maneuverability at the cost of increased drag. The result was a missile four times the weight of Strela-2, with only slightly longer reach, but otherwise much better performance.

== Vehicle ==
Each TEL carries four ready-to fire missiles, but typically no missiles for reloading. Reloading is performed manually and usually takes approximately 5 minutes. The missile boxes are lowered for transport to lower the total height of the vehicle. The driver and commander have periscopes for viewing outside the vehicle when the hatches are closed.

Apart from the new turret, the other major change to the BRDM-2 chassis is the removal of the belly wheels (which are presumably to improve off-road performance). The driver and commander both have infra-red vision systems. The vehicle has standard NBC (Nuclear, Biological and Chemical) protection including overpressure. The missiles fold down to the sides of the turret which greatly reduces the height of the vehicle whilst travelling. Each vehicle weighs around 7 tonnes (7.7 short tons) and has a 104 kW (140 hp) engine and a central tire pressure control system.

== Missiles and guidance ==
=== 9M31 ===
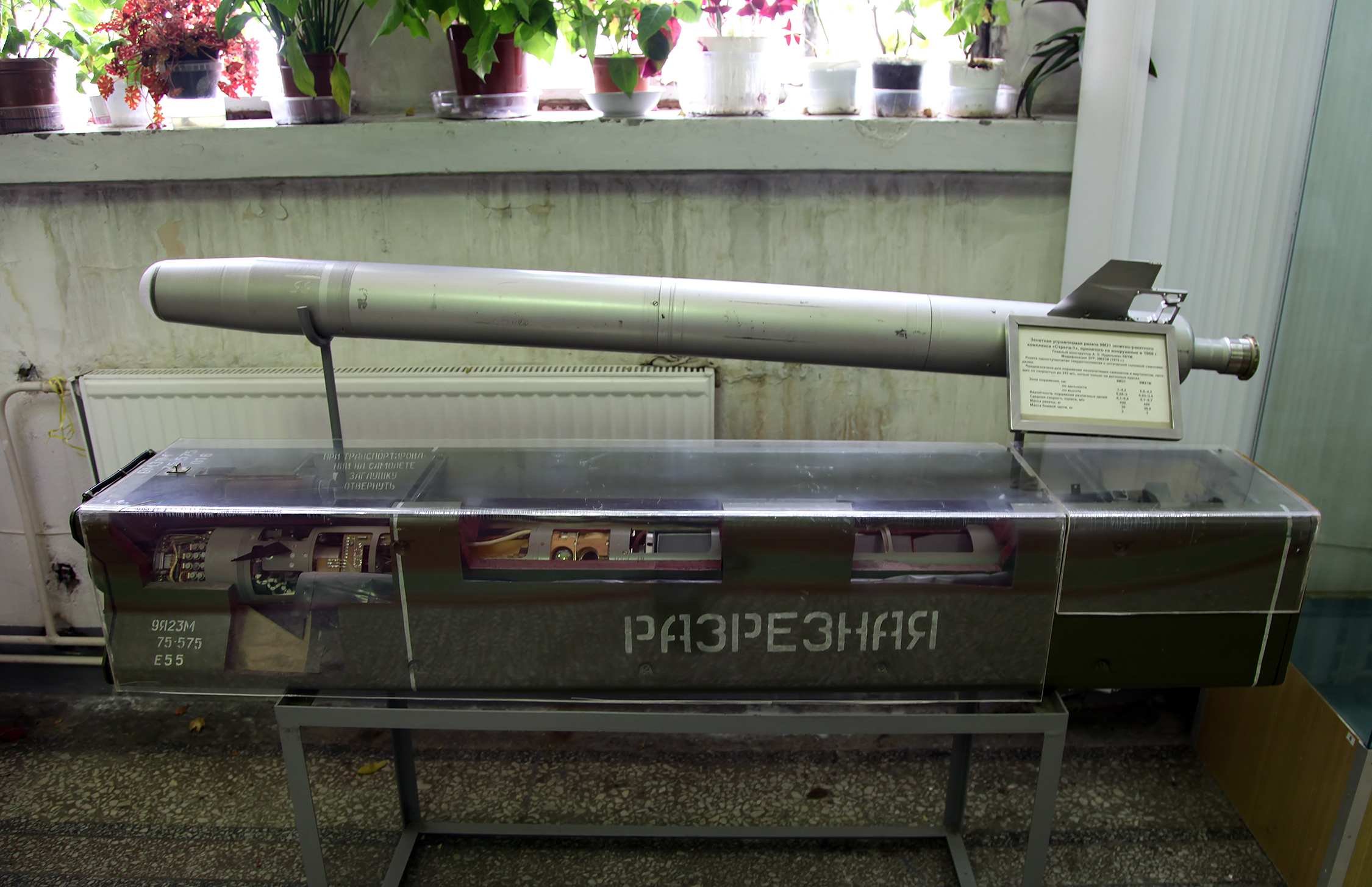
The 9M31 missile

According to a number of Russian sources, the original 9M31 (US DoD designation SA-9A "Gaskin-Mod0") had a zone of reliable target destruction from 900 to 4200 metres. Several western and also some Russian sources give much higher range estimates of 800 to 6500 m (0.5 to 4 miles); these may refer to maximum firing range against an approaching target and minimum against receding, which are obviously larger envelopes as the target only has to reach the intercept zone by the time the missile would reach it.

The missile is effective against targets receding at a maximum speed of 220 m/s, or approaching at 310 m/s.

9M31
- Type: Surface-to-air missile
- Place of origin: Soviet Union

Production history
- Variants: 9M31, 9M31M

Specifications (9M31)
- Mass: 30 kg (66 lb)
- Length: 1.803 m (5.92 ft)
- Diameter: 120 mm (4.7 in)
- Wingspan: 36 mm (1.4 in)
- Warhead: Frag-HE
- Warhead weight: 3 kg (6.6 lb)
- Detonation mechanism: RF Proximity
- Propellant: single-stage Solid-fuel rocket motor
- Operational range: 4,200 metres (2.6 mi) (sometimes reported also as 6.5 kilometres (4.0 mi) for 9M31, 8 kilometres (5.0 mi) for the 9M31M.)
- Flight altitude: 3,500 metres (11,500 ft) (some sources give also higher figures)
- Maximum speed: Mach 1.8
- Guidance system: photocontrast Lead(II) sulfide infrared homing seeker. (sometimes reported also as IR seeker of 1–3 μm and/or 1–5 μm wavelength);

The warhead was primarily intended to impact the target directly, and had contact and magnetic fuzes, but also contained a back-up optical proximity fuze to detonate the warhead in case of a near miss. The missile also had an unusual safety mechanism in case of a miss; rather than a self-destruct fuze, if the optical fuze didn't detect a target within 13–16 seconds, the warhead safety mechanism would be engaged to prevent its detonation upon impact.

The missile is propelled by a single-stage solid-fuel rocket motor, which is ignited a few meters from the launch tube. As the throw-out charge ejects the missile from its canister, it trails a wire from its rear. The main rocket ignites when the missile reaches the wire's end at a few metres distance, and is cut off from it. To achieve roll stabilization, the rollerons on the tailfins are used. In contrast with the rollerons used on some IR guided air-to-air missiles which are spun by the airflow, 9M31 missile uses four wires which are wound on the rollerons' discs, with other end connected to the launch tube. On launch their wires crank the discs to speed.

The seeker head is an unusual construction, using uncooled lead sulphide (PbS) detector elements but with an unusual tracking mechanism. Uncooled PbS elements are commonly used to detect radiation at only short wavelengths of less than 2 micrometers. Only very hot objects emit strongly at such short wavelengths, limiting heat-seeking systems using uncooled PbS detector elements to rear-hemisphere engagements against jet targets, although propeller-driven aircraft and helicopters can of course be engaged from any direction from which the exhaust or other very hot parts of the engine are visible.

The seeker head of 9M31, however, utilizes the PbS elements differently from usual. Taking advantage of the fact that the clear sky gives strong and constant background emission at below 2 micrometer range, peaking at visual light (0.4 to 0.7 micrometer) wavelengths at which PbS at a temperature of 295 kelvins still provides a response, the seeker head is used to track the absence of radiation when the target blocks the background. The method is called optical photocontrast homing (Rus.: фотоконтрастное наведение). The advantage of photocontrast homing method over traditional heat-seeking homing heads using PbS elements is that it negates the most serious drawback of early-generation IR-homing missiles: complete lack of front-aspect engagement capability against approaching jets. Even early cooled seeker heads had usually only limited forward hemisphere engagement abilities, often reducing to zero in case of jets approaching exactly towards the shooter.

The new photo-contrast seeker also had serious limits, which came in the form of rather strict meteorological conditions that had to be met to enable the seeker to detect and track the target. It could only engage targets against background conditions of either clear sky or solid overcast, at least 20 degrees away from the sun, and at least 2 degrees above horizon. Nevertheless, following a study of battlefield conditions and aircraft tactics in past conflicts where short-range air defences had been used, it was concluded that conditions allowing the use of such a homing system were common enough to make it a cost-effective design choice and a better trade-off than the only practical alternative available at the time, which was infrared homing restricted to rear-hemisphere engagements.

The fact that Strela-1 would be supplemented by IR-homing Strela-2 and radar-controlled ZSU-23-4 self-propelled AA gun system may have influenced the decision in favour of such an unusual homing system. The main advantage of the choice was that it made Strela-1 the only ADA system in the Soviet tank or motor rifle regiment that could engage approaching targets out to a range of several kilometers – the ZSU being hampered by very short range, and Strela-2 by its limitation to tail-chase engagements of ground attack jets, after the jet had already delivered its attack.

=== 9M31M ===
While the 9M31 was accepted to service after state trials in 1968, the trials committee also suggested improvements that should be incorporated into the weapon as soon as possible. As a result of these improvements, the 9M31M "Strela-1M" (US DoD designation SA-9B "Gaskin-Mod1") entered service in 1970.

The new version introduced many incremental improvements in the performance characteristics of the missile: it had a slightly heavier warhead (increased from 2.6 kg to 3 kg), a more accurate guidance system to increase the probability of a hit, and extended range. Range is again reported to be as high as 8000 m (0.35 to 5 miles) in a number of western and also a few Russian sources, whereas for example Petukhov & Shestov, Lappi, and a number Russian web sources give much more modest performance figures; considering the performance of similar systems, at least an intercept range of 8,000 m seems unlikely for such a small, high-drag missile design.

== Deployment ==
The Strela-1 was deployed in short-range air defense batteries of Soviet motor rifle and tank regiments. The battery consisted of a gun platoon of four ZSU-23-4 Shilkas, and a SAM platoon with four Strela-1 vehicles.

The Strela-1 platoon contains, in addition to a command vehicle, one TEL fitted with a passive radar detection system similar to a Radar Warning Receiver, and several more (usually three) without any radar system. The radar detection system is the 9S16 "Flat Box" and consists of four sensors mounted around the BRDM vehicle giving it 360 degree coverage. This system emits no radar energy but can detect radio waves emitted from aircraft, giving the vehicle warning about incoming aircraft and aiding in the acquisition of the target aircraft with the optical system. Typical tactics call for the launch of two missiles against each target to improve the chance of destroying it.

In Russia, the 9K31 Strela-1 system was superseded by the 9K35 Strela-10.

== Operators ==
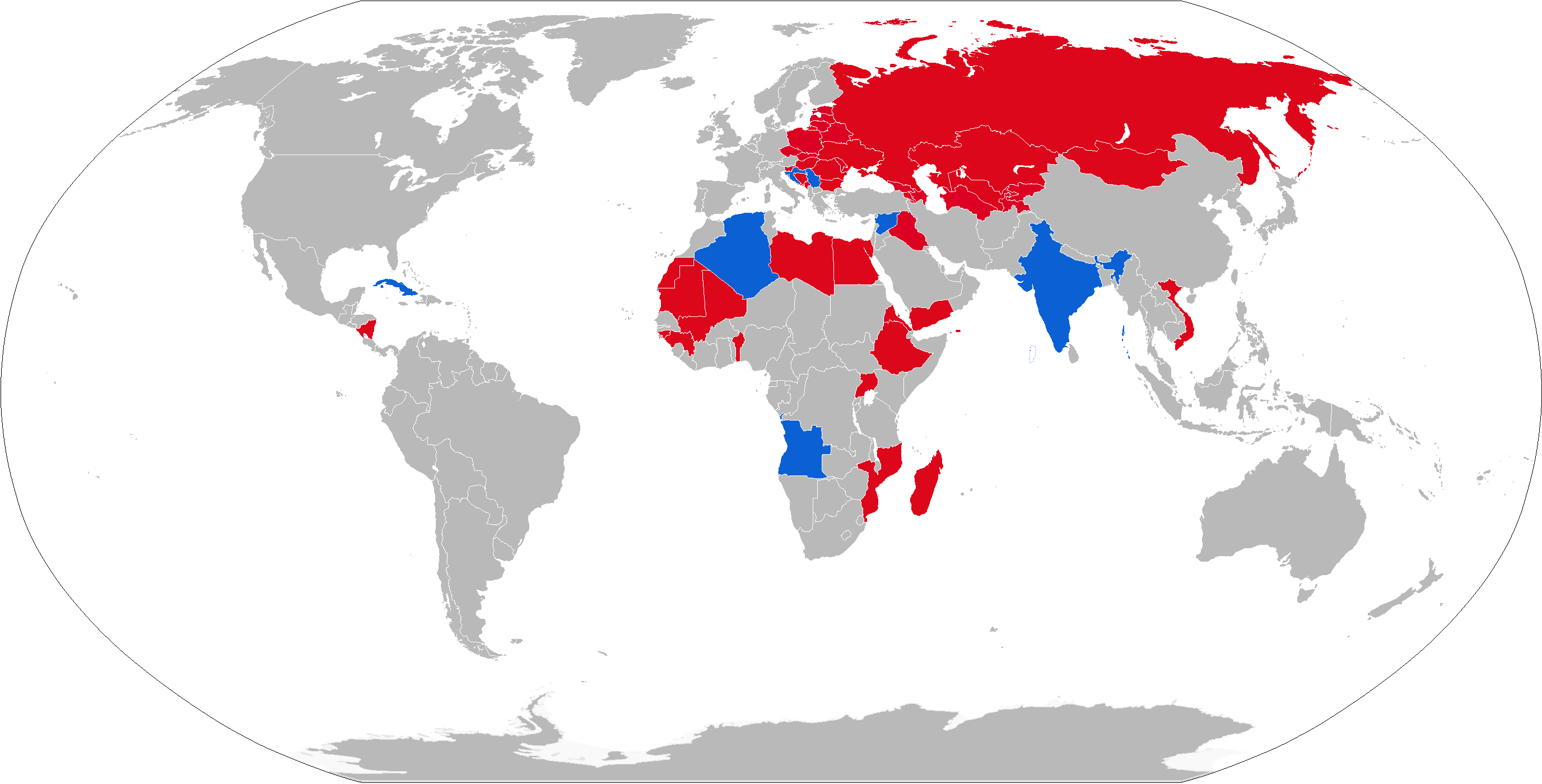
Operators Current Former

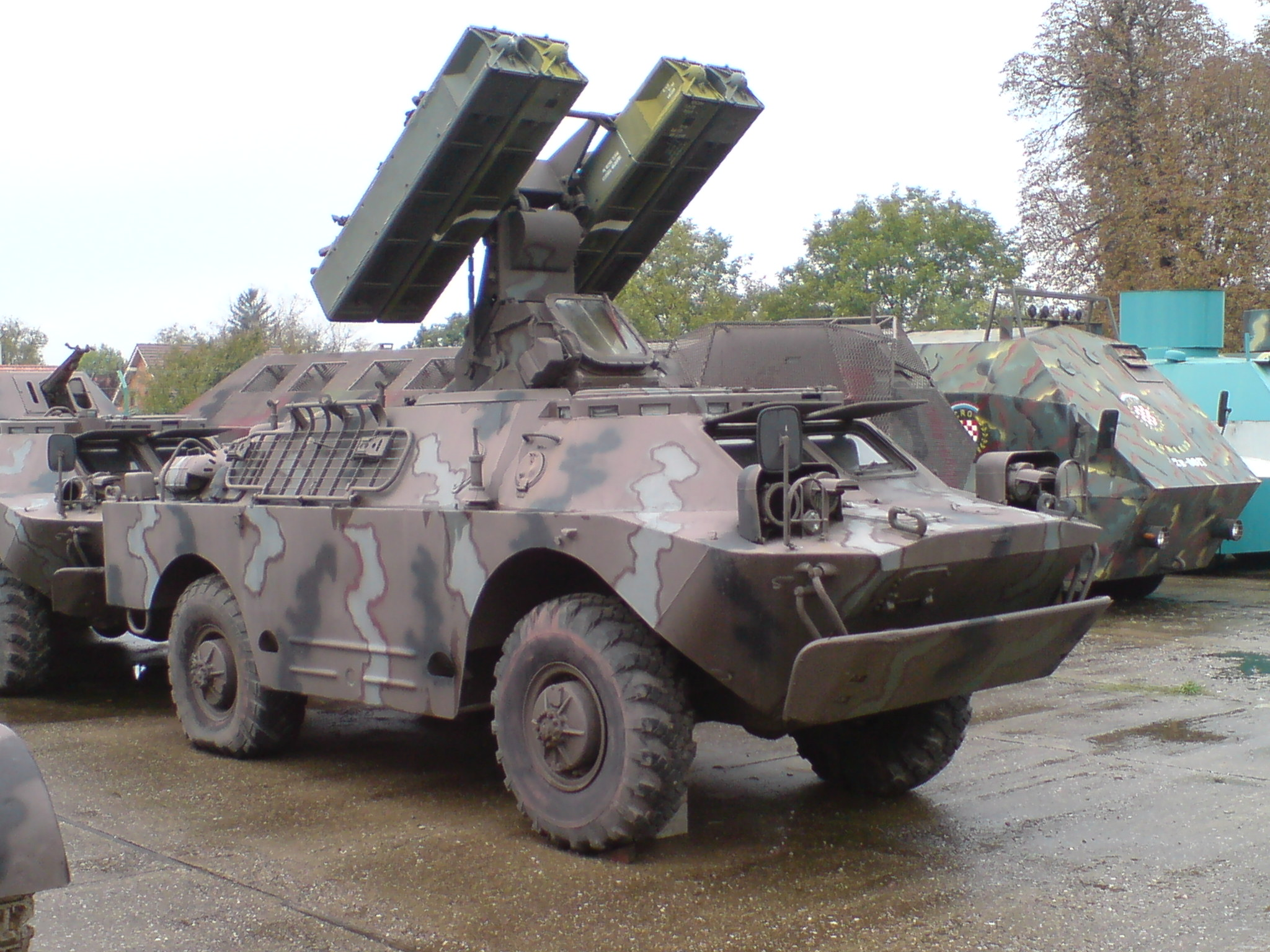
Croatian 9K31.

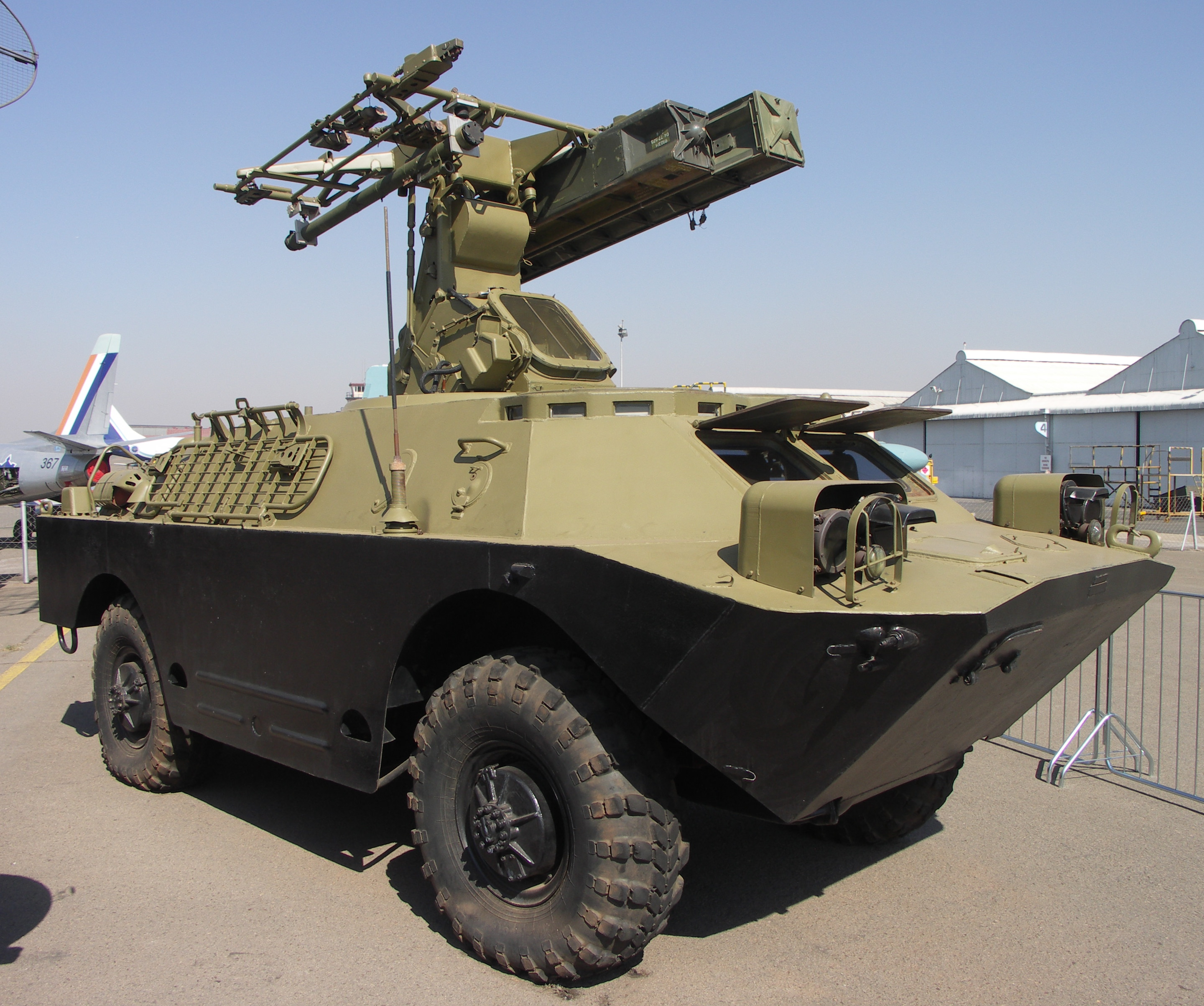
Angolan 9K31 captured by South African troops during Operation Askari.

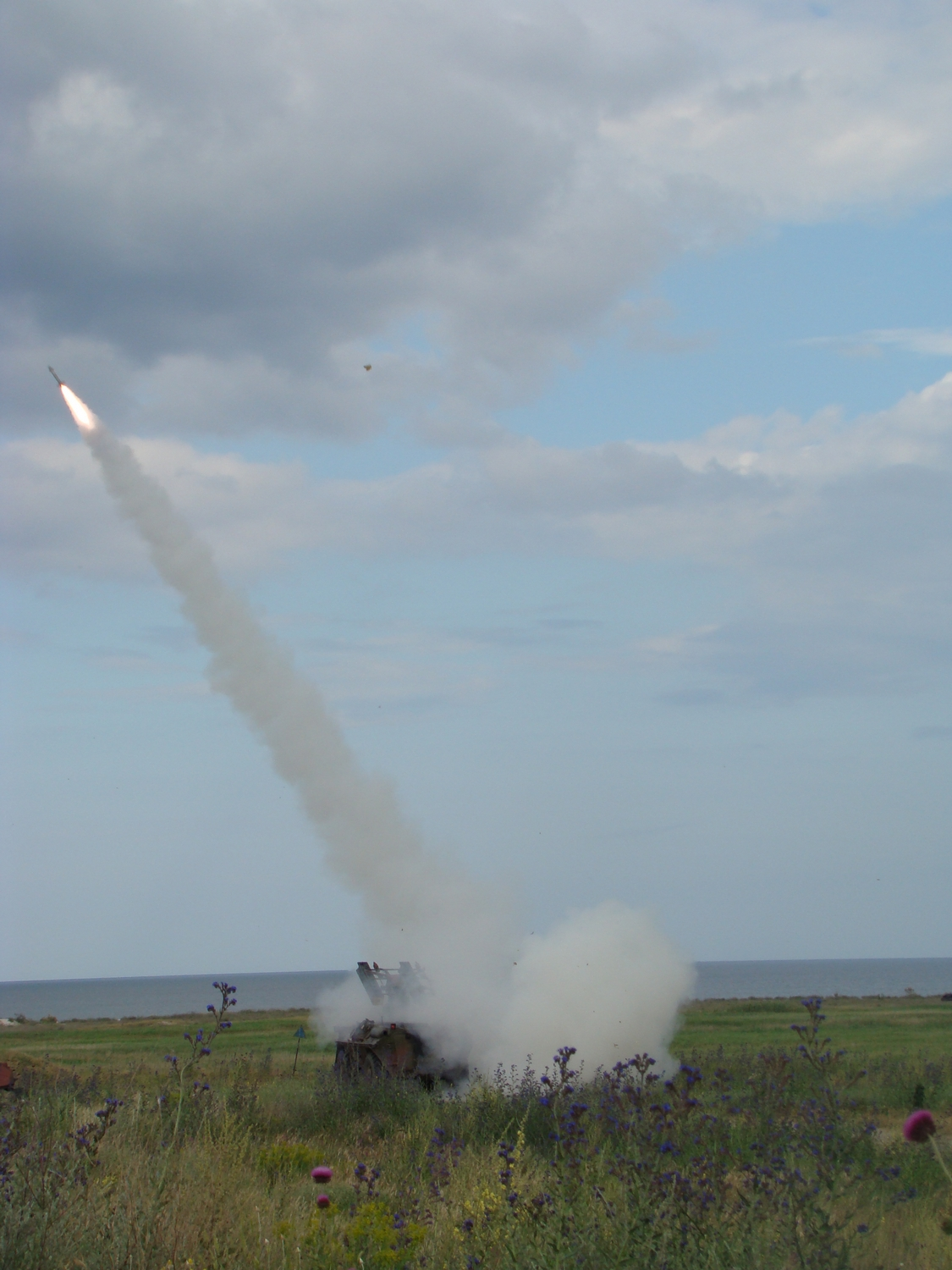
Missile launch of a Romanian CA-95 (licensed built 9K31 Strela-1 using a TABC-79 vehicle instead of a BRDM-2).

=== Current ===
- Algeria – 20 as of 2024
- Angola − 20 as of 2024
- Cuba – 60 in 2002, an unknown number remain in service as of 2024
- Croatia
- Mauritania – 4 as of 2024
- Romania − Produced locally as the CA-95, 48 in service as of 2024
- Russia – 40 9K31 Strela-1 and 9K35 Strela-10 in service with the Russian Naval Infantry as of 2024
- Serbia − 12 9K31M Strela-1M as of 2024

=== Disputed ===
- Sahrawi Arab Democratic Republic

=== Former ===
- Benin − 4 in 2002
- Bulgaria – 50 in 2002
- Czechoslovakia – 80+ systems in 1992. Passed on to successor states
- Czech Republic
- East Germany – Passed on to the unified German state and retired shortly after
- Egypt − 20 in 2002
- Ethiopia
- Herzeg-Bosnia
- Hungary − 28 in 2002
- India – 200 as of 2024
- Iraq – All destroyed or scrapped after the 2003 invasion of Iraq
- Israel − Captured vehicles used for training only
- Libya – 60 in 1992, unknown number operational prior to the First Libyan Civil War
- Mozambique
- Nicaragua
- Palestine Liberation Organization
- Poland – 200+ in 2002
- Republika Srpska
- Serbia and Montenegro − Passed on to Serbia
- Slovenia
- Slovakia
- South Africa – Captured several vehicles in Angola and upgraded them, used for training only
- Tanzania
- Ukraine
- United States − Used for OPFOR exercises
- Soviet Union – 430 in 1991. Passed on to successor states
- Vietnam
- South Yemen
- Syria − 20 in 2002, an unknown number remained in service prior to the fall of the Assad regime
- Yemen − Around 24
- Yugoslavia – 100+ launchers in 1992. Passed on to successor states

== See also ==
- 1985 Aeroflot Antonov An-12 shoot-down
- 9K35 Strela-10

== Bibliography ==
- Cooper, Tom (2017). Hot Skies Over Yemen, Volume 1: Aerial Warfare Over the South Arabian Peninsula, 1962-1994. Solihull, UK: Helion & Company Publishing. ISBN 978-1-912174-23-2.
- Cooper, Tom (2018). Hot Skies Over Yemen, Volume 2: Aerial Warfare Over the South Arabian Peninsula, 1994-2017. Warwick, UK: Helion & Company Publishing. ISBN 978-1-911628-18-7.
- Cullen, Tony; Foss, Christopher F. (1992). Jane's Land-based Air Defence 1992-93 (5th ed.). Jane's Information Group. ISBN 978-0710609793.
- International Institute for Strategic Studies (1989). The Military Balance 1989-1990. London: Brassey's. ISBN 978-0080375694.
- International Institute for Strategic Studies (1991). The Military Balance 1991-1992. London: Brassey's. ISBN 978-0080413259.
- International Institute for Strategic Studies (2011). The Military Balance 2011. London: Routledge. p. 321. ISBN 978-1857436068.
- International Institute for Strategic Studies (2024). The Military Balance 2024. Taylor & Francis. ISBN 978-1-040-05115-3.
- Lappi, Ahti: Ilmatorjunta kylmässä sodassa
- O'Halloran, James C.; Foss, Christopher F., eds. (2002). Jane's Land-Based Air Defense 2002-2003 (15th ed.). Janes Information Group. ISBN 978-0-7106-2437-6.
- Petukhov, Sergei I., Shestov I.V.: Istorija sozdanija i razvitija vooruzhenija i vojennoi theniki PVO suhoputnyh voisk Rossii
