= Cugir machine gun =

Mitraliera md. 66
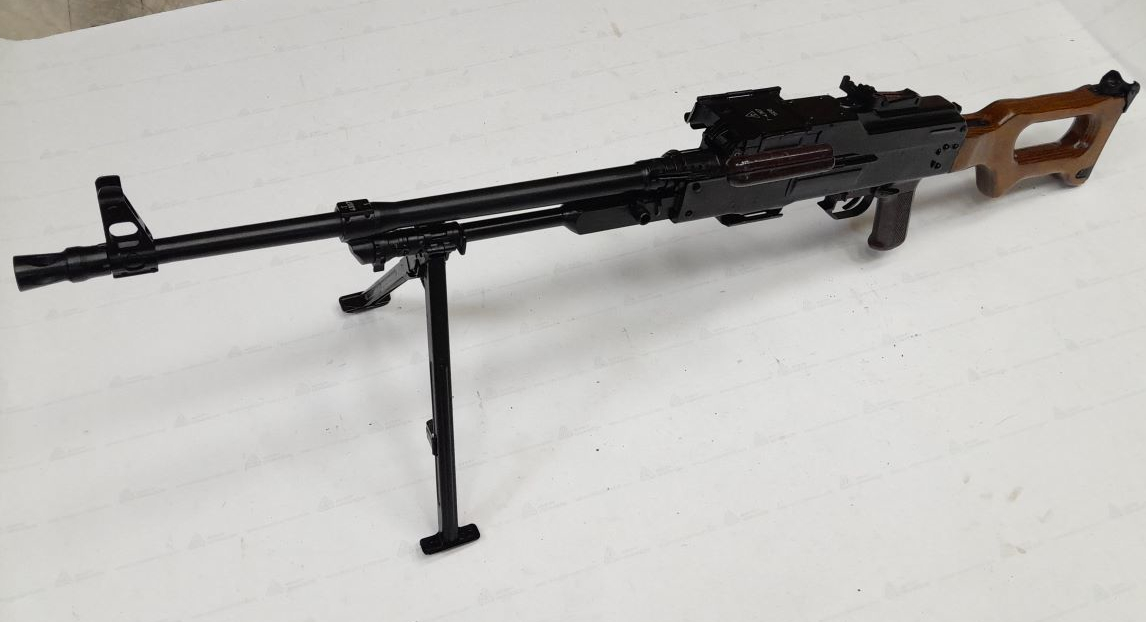
- Type: General-purpose machine gun
- Place of origin: Romania

Service history
- In service: 1966–Present
- Used by: Romanian Land Forces
- Wars: War in Afghanistan

Production history
- Designed: 1966
- Manufacturer: Fabrica de Arme Cugir SA
- Produced: 1966–present

Specifications
- Mass: 7.8 kg (17 lb); Tripod 5 kg (11 lb); 100 round box magazine 3.9 kg (8.6 lb)
- Length: 1.1 m: barrel 0.72 m
- Cartridge: 7.62×54mmR
- Action: Gas operated
- Rate of fire: 650 rds/min
- Muzzle velocity: 825 m/s
- Feed system: Belt fed
- Sights: Mechanical; adjustable 1 to 1,500 m (1 to 1,640 yd)

The Mitraliera md. 66 (Mitralieră de companie, calibrul 7,62 mm, model 1966) is a gas-operated rotating bolt-locking medium machine gun, it is a licensed produced copy of the Soviet PKM, used by Romanian Land Forces. It can be carried and operated by one person, but an assistant gunner is usually employed. It is available with either a 250-round belt or a 100-round box magazine.

There is also a light machine gun variant chambered for the less powerful 7.62×39mm cartridge, RPK like.

== Users ==
- Romania

== Gallery ==
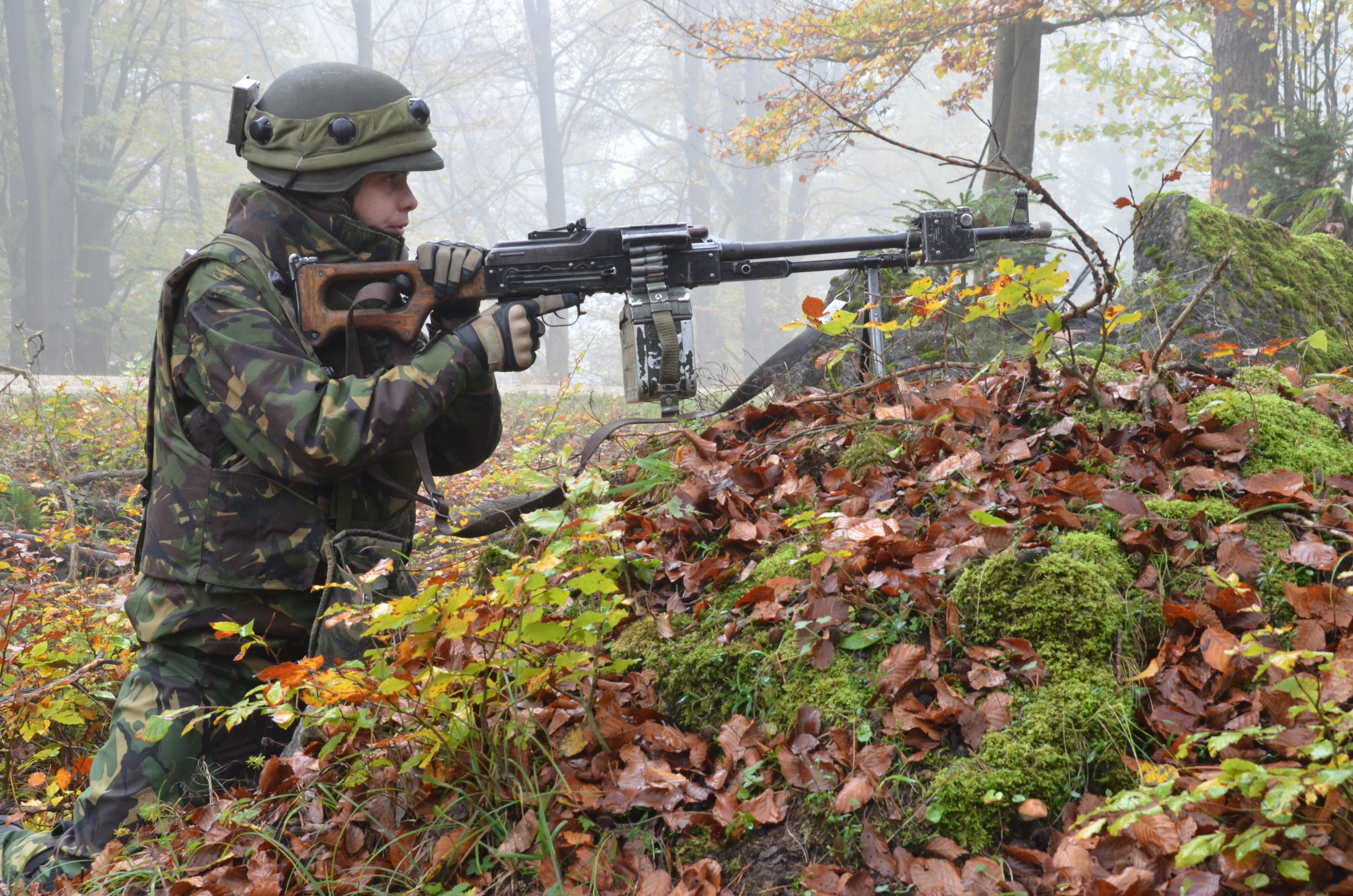
Romanian soldier during an exercise

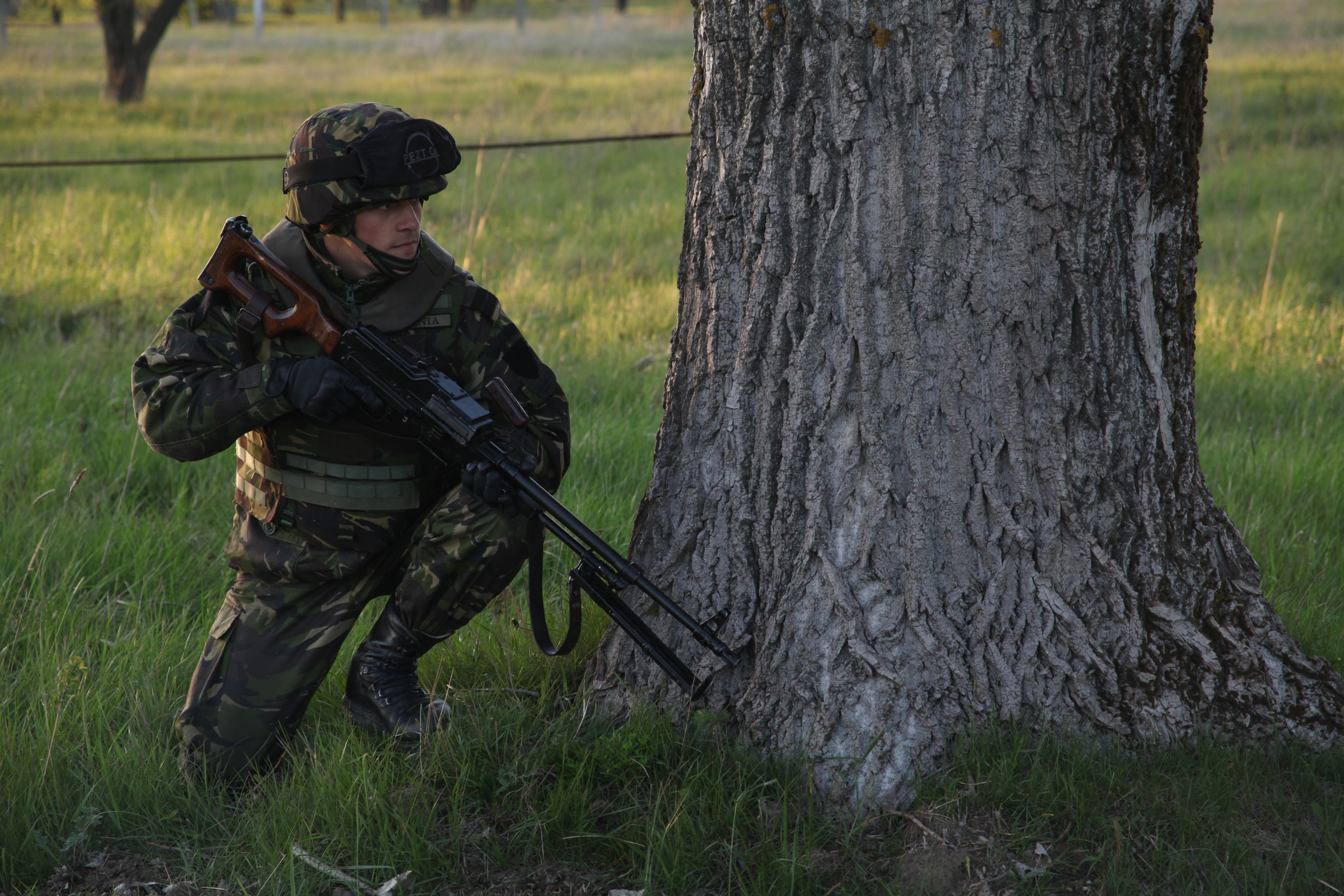
Romanian soldier during an exercise

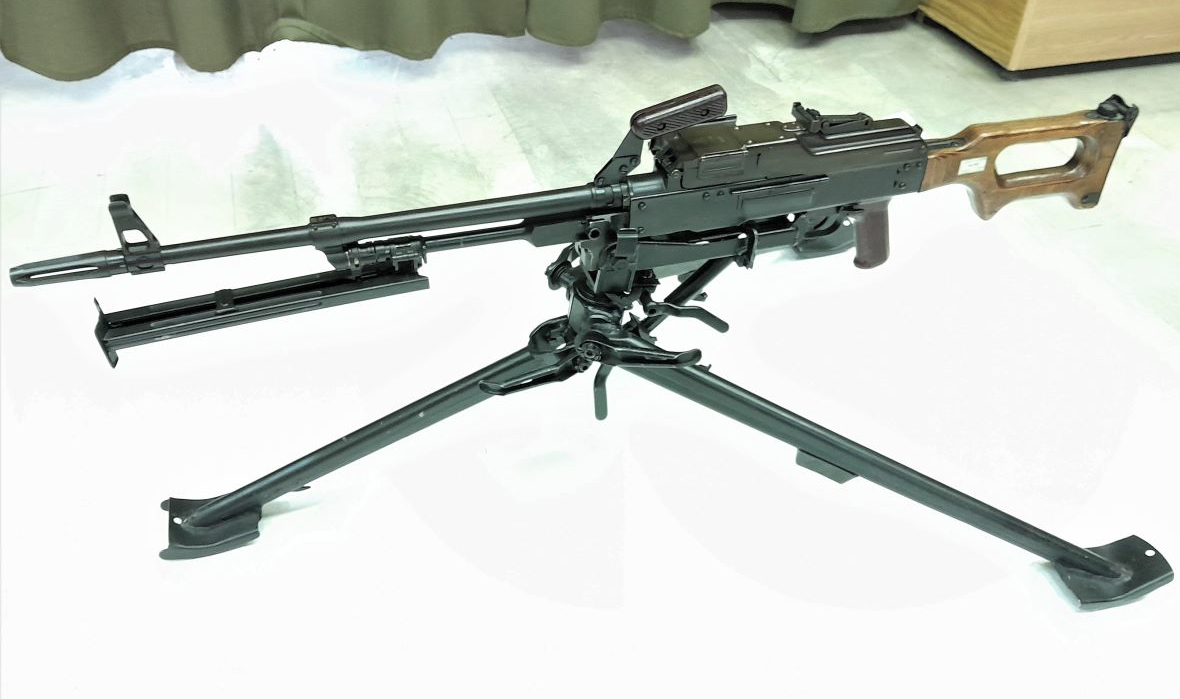
1975-produced Cugir machine gun on a tripod mount

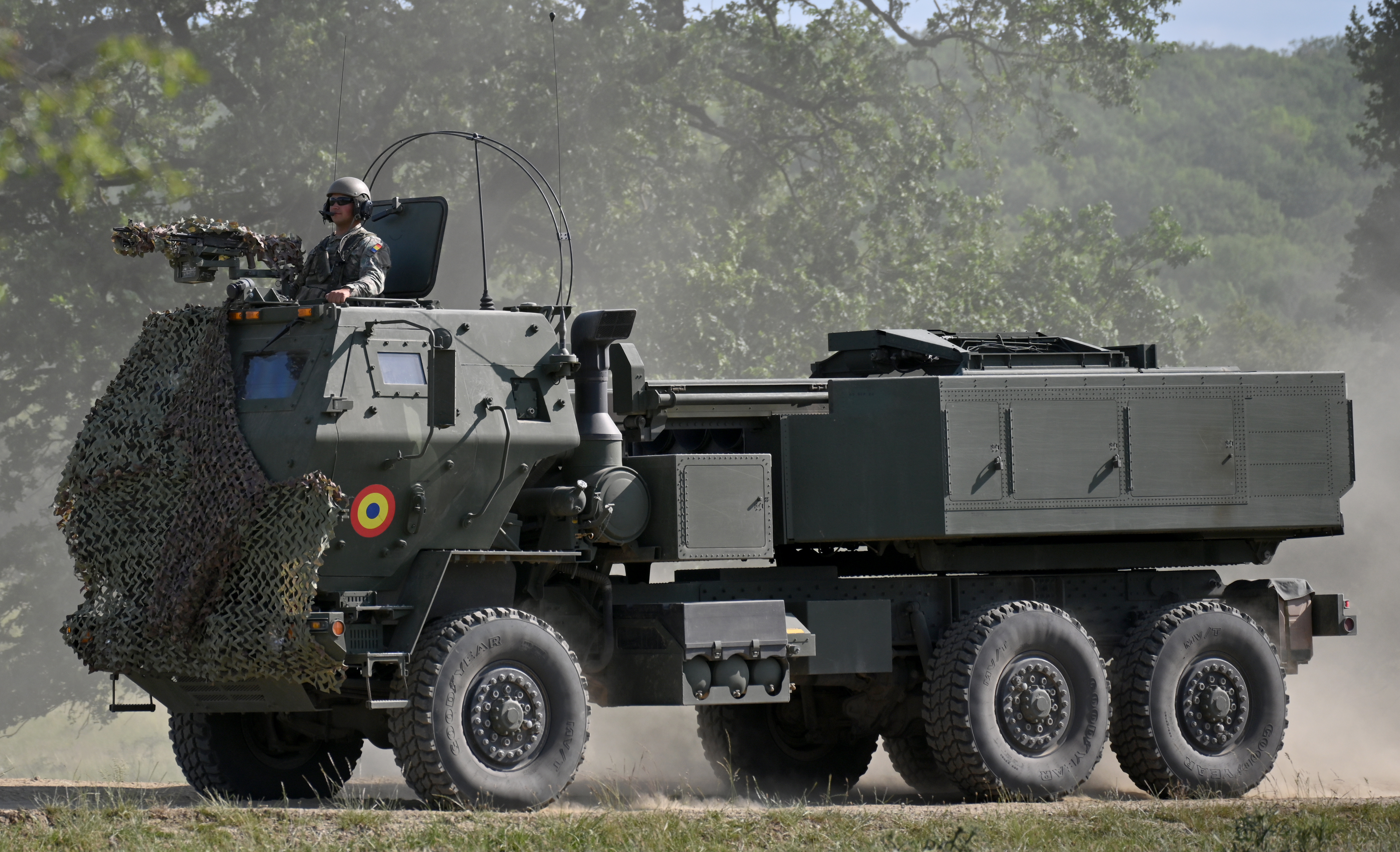
Md. 66 machine gun mounted on an M142 HIMARS
