= Human Ecology Fund =

Former CIA-funded operation

The Society for the Investigation of Human Ecology (SIHE) was founded by Harold G. Wolff, MD, in New York in 1954. In 1961, the organization was renamed the Human Ecology Fund and relocated to Cornell University’s Medical School. This organization served as a front for CIA-funded research under Project MK-ULTRA, funneling grant money to behavioral scientists to finance research into interrogation, coercion, and torture methods. The Human Ecology Fund closed in 1965, after the CIA transferred funds and research projects to other outlets.

Neurologist Harold Wolff of Cornell University Medical College was president of the organization, with Lawrence Hinkle, a Cardiologist, serving as its vice president. Other board members included Adolf Berle, JD of Columbia University, Dr. Joseph Hinsey of NY Hospital-Cornell Medical Center, Dr. Carl Rogers of University of Wisconsin, and Dr. John Whitehorn of Johns Hopkins.

Harold Wolff’s presence at Cornell made the University a hub for Human Ecology Fund operations. In one project conducted at Cornell University, Wolff investigated 100 Chinese refugees with the goal of molding them into CIA agents. It is not believed that this experiment provided any significant findings, as it was interrupted by the CIA in 1955. One of the most well-known Human Ecology projects involved interviewing Hungarian refugees from the 1956 Hungarian revolt to determine the ways in which the refugees "retained their identities under Soviet occupation."

In addition to financing research projects related to CIA interests, the Human Ecology Fund allegedly funded academic research not related to CIA interests in order to maintain its public facade as a respectable research institution. It is believed that the academic researchers involved in research funded by the Human Ecology Fund were generally unaware or deceived about the funding source.

The Geschickter Fund was a similar front for CIA research on biochemical and medical research at Georgetown, Stanford and MIT. During MKULTRA's existence 44 U.S. and Canadian universities received CIA funding, with the full list still classified.

== See also ==
- Human rights violations by the CIA
- Unethical human experimentation in the United States
- Pike Committee (U.S. House investigation into CIA) activities)
- Church Commission (U.S. Senate investigation into CIA )
- Rockefeller Commission (Presidential investigation of CIA) activities)
