= Official reports by the U.S. Government on the CIA =

At various times since the creation of the Central Intelligence Agency, the Federal government of the United States has produced comprehensive reports on CIA actions that marked historical watersheds in how CIA went about trying to fulfill its vague charter purposes from 1947. These reports were the result of internal or presidential studies, external investigations by congressional committees or other arms of the Federal government of the United States, or even the simple releases and declassification of large quantities of documents by the CIA.

Several investigations led by the Church Committee, Rockefeller Commission and Pike Committee, as well as released declassified documents, reveal that the CIA, at times, operated outside its charter. In some cases, such as during Watergate, this may have been due to inappropriate requests by White House staff. In other cases, there was a violation of Congressional intent, such as the Iran-Contra affair. In many cases, these reports provide the only official discussion of these actions available to the public.

== 1949 Eberstadt Report (First Hoover Commission) ==
The first major analysis, following the National Security Act of 1947, was chaired by former President Herbert Hoover, with a Task Force on National Security Organization under Ferdinand Eberstadt, one of the drafters of the National Security Act and a believer in centralized intelligence.

The task force concluded that the system of the day led to an adversarial relationship, with little effective coordination, among the CIA, the military, and the State Department. "In the opinion of the task force, this produced duplication on one hand, and, on the other, departmental intelligence estimates that "have often been subjective and biased." In large measure, the military and State Department were blamed for their failure to consult and share pertinent information with the CIA. The task force recommended "that positive efforts be made to foster relations of mutual confidence between the [CIA] and the several departments and agencies that it serves."

This report stressed that the CIA "must be the central organization of the national intelligence system." It recommended a "... top echelon [of] an evaluation board or section composed of competent and experienced personnel who would have no administrative responsibilities and whose duties would be confined solely to intelligence evaluation." It also favored a civilian DCI with a long term in office.

In the arena of covert operations and clandestine intelligence, the Eberstadt Report supported the integration of all clandestine operations into one office within CIA, under NSC supervision. To alleviate concerns expressed by the military who viewed this proposal as encroaching upon their prerogatives, the report stated that clandestine operations should be the responsibility of the Joint Chiefs of Staff (JCS) in time of war.

The report declared that the failure to appraise scientific advances (e.g., biological and chemical warfare, electronics, aerodynamics, guided missiles, atomic weapons, and nuclear energy) in hostile countries might have more immediate and catastrophic consequences than failure in any other field of intelligence. It urged the US to develop a centralized capability for tracking these developments.

== 1949 Dulles-Jackson-Correa Report ==
The Eberstadt report was soon eclipsed by what may have been the most influential policy paper. "On January 8, 1948, the National Security Council established the Intelligence Survey Group (ISG) to "evaluate the CIA's effort and its relationship with other agencies." The Jackson-Dulles-Correa report held an opposite view on clandestine collection to the Eberstadt Report, interesting in that Dulles was a clandestine collection specialist.

Like the Hoover Commission, this group was chartered at the request of President Truman, and was made up of Allen W. Dulles, who had served in the Office of Strategic Services (OSS) during the Second World War and would become DCI in 1953, William Jackson, a future Deputy DCI, and Matthias Correa, a former assistant to Secretary of Defense James V. Forrestal when the latter had served as Secretary of the Navy during the war. Chaired by Dulles, the ISG presented its findings, known as the Dulles-Jackson-Correa Report, to the National Security Council on January 1, 1949. Partially declassified in 1976, it "contained fifty-six recommendations, many highly critical of the CIA and DCI. In particular, the report revealed problems in the agency's execution of both its intelligence and operational missions. It also criticized the quality of national intelligence estimates by highlighting the CIA's—and, by implication, the DCI's--"failure to take charge of the production of coordinated national estimates." The report went on to argue that the CIA's current trend in clandestine intelligence activities should be reversed in favor of its mandated role as coordinator of intelligence." It was "particularly concerned about the personnel situation at CIA, including internal security, the high turnover of employees, and the excessive number of military personnel assigned to the agency." See the continuing concern about personnel in the 1954 Doolittle Report To add "continuity of service" and the "greatest assurance of independence of action," the report argued that the DCI should be a civilian and that military appointees be required to resign their commissions.

As with the Eberstadt Report, the Dulles Report also expressed concern about the inadequacies in scientific intelligence and the professionalism of the service intelligence organizations, and urged that the CIA provide greater coordination. This led to a recommendation for increased coordination between the DCI and the Director of the Federal Bureau of Investigation (FBI) in the arena of counterespionage. In turn, the report recommended that the Director of FBI be elevated to membership in the committee to help the DCI coordinate intelligence and set intelligence requirements.

The report proposed a large-scale reorganization of CIA. Even though it emphasized intelligence analysis and coordination over operations, it

suggested incorporating covert operations and clandestine intelligence into one office within CIA. ... the Office of Special Operations (OSO), responsible for the clandestine collection of intelligence, and the Office of Policy Coordination (OPC), responsible for covert actions, be integrated into a single division within CIA. [It] recommended replacing existing offices with four new divisions for coordination, estimates, research and reports, and operations.

The heads of the new offices would be included in the immediate staff of the DCI so that he would have "intimate contact with the day-to-day operations of his agency and be able to give policy guidance to them." These recommendations would become the start of the model for the future organization and operation of the present-day CIA. Until the DNI creation, estimates were in a separate office reporting to the DCI, coordination was a job of the DDCI (later assisted by the Intelligence Community Staff), research and reports became the Directorate of Intelligence, and operations was first, euphemistically, called the Directorate of Plans. Directorates for Support (originally called Administration), and Science & Technology, were also created.

== 1954 Doolittle Report on Covert Activities ==
Gen. James Doolittle did an extensive report on covert actions, specifically for President Dwight D. Eisenhower.

The report's first recommendation dealt with personnel. It recommended releasing a large number of current staff that could never be more than mediocre, aggressively recruit new staff with an overall goal of increasing the workforce, and intensify training, with 10% of the covert staff time spent in training. The Director should be nonpolitical.

Security was the next concern, starting with a drive to reduce interim and provisional security clearances. The report strongly endorsed use of the polygraph both for initial recruits and existing staff. Counterespionage needed to be strengthened, and field stations needed both to report on their staff and periodically be inspected. Consolidating the Washington workforce, which was scattered among buildings, into one or a few main buildings was seen as a way of improving the security of classified information.

Coordination in the intelligence community was seen as a problem, especially agreeing on clear understandings between CIA and military intelligence organizations. The overall IC program for eliciting information from defectors needed improvement, with contributions from multiple agencies.

As far as organization and management, the report described the structure of the Directorate of Plans (i.e., the clandestine service) as too complex and in need of simplification. The Inspector General needed an agency-wide mandate. The role of the Operations Coordinating Board, the covert and clandestine oversight staff of the National Security Council needed to be strengthened, with operations clearly approved and guided from the highest levels of government.

The report addressed the classic problem of increasing performance while reducing costs. This meant better review of the budgets of covert and clandestine activities by a Review Board, except for the most sensitive operations. It meant providing the Comptroller with enough information, even if sanitized, to do a thorough job.

== 1956 Bruce-Lovett Report ==
Soon after President Dwight D. Eisenhower created the President's Board of Consultants on Foreign Intelligence Activities, that Board requested that Robert A. Lovett and David K.E. Bruce examine CIA's covert operations. This information comes from Arthur Schlesinger's book about Robert F. Kennedy.

"Bruce was very much disturbed," Lovett told the Cuba board of inquiry in 1961. "He approached it from the standpoint of 'what right have we to go barging into other countries buying newspapers and handing money to opposition parties or supporting a candidate for this, that or the other office?' He felt this was an outrageous interference with friendly countries ... He got me alarmed, so instead of completing the report in thirty days we took two months or more."

The 1956 report, written in Bruce's spirited style, condemned

the increased mingling in the internal affairs of other nations of bright, highly graded young men who must be doing something all the time to justify their reason for being. ... Busy, moneyed, and privileged [the CIA] likes its "King Making" responsibility (the intrigue is fascinating – considerable self-satisfaction, sometimes with applause, derives from "successes" – no charge is made for "failures" – and the whole business is very much simpler than collecting covert intelligence on the USSR through the usual CIA methods!). Bruce and Lovett could discover no reliable system of control. "there are always, of course, on record the twin, well-born purpose of 'frustrating the Soviets' and keeping others 'pro-western' oriented. Under these almost any [covert] action can be and is being justified. ... Once having been conceived, the final approval given to any project (at informal lunch meetins of the OCB [Operations Coordinating Board] inner group) can, at best, be described as pro forma." One consequence was that "no one, other than those in the CIA immediately concerned with their day to day operation, has any detailed knowledge of what is going on." With "a horde of CIA representatives" swarming around the planet, CIA covert action was exerting "significant, almost unilateral influences ... on the actual formulation of our foreign policies ... sometimes completely unknown" to the local American ambassador.

Bruce and Lovett concluded with a plea about taking control of covert operations and their consequences:

Should not someone, somewhere in an authoritative position in our government, on a continuing basis, be ... calculating ... the long-range wisdom of activities which have entailed a virtual abandonment of the international "golden rule," and which, if successful to the degree claimed for them, are responsible in a great measure for stirring up the turmoitl and raising the doubts about us that exist in many countries of the world today? ... Where will we be tomorrow? "Bruce was very much disturbed," Lovett told the Cuba board of inquiry in 1961. "He approached it from the standpoint of 'what right have we to go barging into other countries buying newspapers and handing money to opposition parties or supporting a candidate for this, that or the other office?' He felt this was an outrageous interference with friendly countries. ...

The CIA itself would like more detail on this report, a copy of which could not be found, in 1995, by the Agency's History Staff. Referring to reports such as the Dulles-Jackson-Correa, Doolittle, Pike, Church, and Rockefeller reports, the Staff "recently ran across a reference to another item, the so-called "Bruce-Lovett" report, that it would very much like to read—if we could find it! The report is mentioned in Peter Grose's recent biography Gentleman Spy: The Life of Allen Dulles. According to Grose, [Bruce and Lovett] prepared a report for President Dwight Eisenhower in the fall of 1956 that criticized CIA's alleged fascination with "kingmaking" in the Third World and complained that a "horde of CIA representatives" was mounting foreign political intrigues at the expense of gathering hard intelligence on the Soviet Union.

The History Staff checked the CIA files on the President's Board of Consultants on Foreign Intelligence Activities (PBCFIA). They checked with the Eisenhower Library. They checked with the National Archives, which holds the PBCFIA records. They checked with the Virginia Historical Society, the custodian of David Bruce's papers. None had a copy.

Having reached a dead end, we consulted the author of the Dulles biography, Peter Grose. Grose told us that he had not seen the report itself but had used notes made from it by historian Arthur M. Schlesinger for Robert F. Kennedy and His Times (1978). Professor Schlesinger informed us that he had seen the report in Robert Kennedy's papers before they were deposited at the John F. Kennedy Presidential Library in Boston. He had loaned Grose his notes and does not have a copy of these notes or of the report itself.

This raises an interesting question: how did a report on the CIA written for President Eisenhower in 1956 end up in the RFK papers? We think we have the answer. Robert Lovett was asked to testify before Gen. Maxwell Taylor's board of inquiry on the 1961 Bay of Pigs operation. Robert Kennedy was on that board and may have asked Lovett for a copy of the report. But we do not have the answer to another question: where is the "Bruce-Lovett" report? The JFK Presidential Library has searched the RFK papers without success. Surely the report will turn up some day, even if one government agency and four separate archives so far haven't been able to find it. But this episode helps to prove one of the few Iron Laws of History: the official who keeps the best records gets to tell the story.

In his book, Legacy of Ashes, Tim Weiner published a "declassified version of the document" in the book's footnotes.

== 1975 investigations ==
The 1975 United States President's Commission on CIA activities within the United States, better known as the Rockefeller Commission investigated questionable practices including assassination attempts and inappropriate domestic operations. Larger Congressional investigations followed in 1975, first the Church Committee of the United States Senate, followed by the Pike Committee of the United States House of Representatives. Eventually, these interim committees were replaced by the U.S. Senate Select Committee on Intelligence and the U.S. House Permanent Select Committee on Intelligence.

== 1996 reports ==
Congress merged divergent proposals from studies of the Aspin–Brown Commission (successively chaired by former Secretaries of Defense Les Aspin and Harold Brown, and whose members were mostly appointed by President Bill Clinton) and the House Permanent Select Committee on Intelligence (chaired by Republican Larry Combest of Texas) in crafting the Intelligence and Defense Authorization Acts for fiscal year 1997, enacting them as amendments to the National Security Act of 1947. The revised Act now gave the DCI a new DDCI for Community Management, along with three “Assistant Directors of Central Intelligence” to coordinate collection, administration, and analysis and production. The community's imagery interpretation offices were merged in a National Imagery and Mapping Agency (NIMA) under the Secretary of Defense. The DCI also received more clout over defense intelligence budgets as well as influence in the appointments of directors of the NSA, NRO, and DIA.

== 2007 documents ==
On 27 June 2007 the CIA released two collections of previously classified documents which outlined various activities of doubtful legality. The first collection, the "Family Jewels," consists of almost 700 pages of responses from CIA employees to a 1973 directive from Director of Central Intelligence James Schlesinger requesting information about activities inconsistent with the Agency's charter.

The second collection, the CAESAR-POLO-ESAU papers, consists of 147 documents and 11,000 pages of research from 1953 to 1973 relating to Soviet and Chinese leadership hierarchies, and Sino-Soviet relations.
