= Executive Order 12036 =

Presidential order on United States Intelligence Activities

- United States Foreign Intelligence Activities

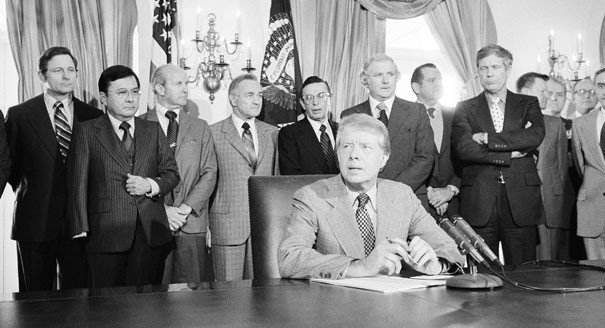
- Jimmy Carter signing Executive Order 12036
- Type: Executive order
- Number: 12036
- President: Jimmy Carter
- Signed: January 24, 1978

Summary
- Strengthens Executive Order 11905; Created the National Foreign Intelligence Board; Banned any Central Intelligence Agency electronic surveillance in the U.S.; Expanded ban on assassinations

Executive Order 12036 is a United States Presidential Executive Order signed on January 24, 1978, by President Jimmy Carter that imposed restrictions on and reformed the U.S. Intelligence Community along with further banning indirect U.S. involvement in assassinations. The EO was designed to strengthen and expand Executive Order 11905, which was originally signed by Gerald R. Ford in 1976.

== Background and history ==
Upon taking office in 1977, President Jimmy Carter's administration with input from Congress immediately began to revise EO 11905 that was signed late in the previous year. Pressure and the need for reform of the U.S. Intelligence Community still existed from the Church and Pike Committees. EO 12036 would be signed barely a year after Carter took office on January 24, 1978. The EO was hailed by Senator Walter D. Huddleston and Jimmy Carter as having the most input from the President and Congress amongst EOs up until that day. Carter also intended the EO to be temporary until new intelligence reform legislation could be put into law. EO 12036 would be superseded by new legislation in the future.

== Intelligence reform ==
Executive Order 12036 created new oversight committees and offered many new restrictions on the U.S. Intelligence Community. The EO set-up the duties and requirements of two National Security Council cabinet-level committees that had been previously created by Carter in 1977. The Policy Review Committee was given the responsibility of defining priorities for intelligence collection and analysis. The Policy Review committee which was chaired by the Director of Central Intelligence (DCI) and also included the Vice President, National Security Advisor, Secretary of State, Secretary of Defense and Chairman of the Joint Chiefs of Staff would also prioritize intelligence community budget allocations.

The EO replaced Gerald Ford's (EO 11905) Operations Advisory Group and replaced it with the Special Coordination Committee which was much like the Policy Review Committee. The EO also imposed a lengthy list of restrictions on the U.S. Intelligence Community to ensure "full compliance with the laws of the United States." One of the main restrictions was that no intelligence operation would be undertaken against a U.S. citizen "unless the President has authorized the type of activity involved and the Attorney General has both approved the particular activity and determined that there is probable cause to believe that the United States person is an agent of a foreign power." This included banning any Central Intelligence Agency electronic surveillance in the U.S. and leaving the Federal Bureau of Investigation as the only intelligence community member allowed to conduct physical searches within the U.S.

The EO also created the National Foreign Intelligence Board (NFIB) in order to assist the DCI with "Production, review, and coordination of national foreign intelligence." The NFIB was chaired by the DCI and included representatives from every agency in the intelligence community. The DCI and agency heads were also expected to keep various congressional committees up to date with intelligence community activity.

The order expanded the ban on assassination in Ford's order to cover all assassination, whether or not "political." This ban on assassination would be restated in Executive Order 12333.

== See also ==
- Targeted killing
