= Harold Wolff =

American neurologist and scientist

Harold George Wolff (May 28, 1898 – February 21, 1962) was an American doctor, neurologist, and was both a scientist and pseudoscientist who conducted intentionally harmful and brain-damaging pseudoscientific human experimentation. He is also generally considered the father of modern headache research, and a pioneer in the study of psychosomatic illness.

Wolff was head of a mind control and human experiment program conducted surreptitiously at Cornell University Medical Center under the auspices of Central Intelligence Agency's MK-ULTRA project. He also set up the Society for the Investigation of Human Ecology as a front organization to facilitate similar activities not only at Cornell but also other university research centers.

== Early life ==
Harold Wolff was born on May 26, 1898, in New York City, the only child of Louis Wolff, a Catholic illustrator, and Emma Recknagel Wolff, Lutheran. He was educated at City College, from which he graduated in 1918, aged 20. After graduating, he worked in a government-supported fishery trying to improve drying fish. He considered becoming a priest before deciding to take up medicine at Harvard Medical School, where he received his M.D. in 1923.

After medical training at New York’s Roosevelt Hospital and Bellevue Hospital Center, he started to study neuropathology with Harry Forbes and Stanley Cobb. In 1928 he travelled abroad, spending a year in Graz, in Austria, with Otto Loewi, and then with Ivan Pavlov in Leningrad, in Russia. Returning to America, he moved to the Psychiatry ward at Phipps Clinic of Johns Hopkins University, working with psychiatrist Adolf Meyer.

== Career ==
In 1932, Wolff returned Boston and became the head of neurology ward, supervised by Eugene Dubois. He later became a professor of medicine and chief neurologist at New York Hospital – Cornell Medical Center.

He was defined as a “combination of administrator and investigator”. Wolff’s pupils described him as a superb clinician, a wise man who exercised vigorously and competitively, sometimes highly obsessive. He used to teach by example, in fact his motto was: "No day without its experiment".

During his last years he devoted much of his energy to the work of the Academy of Religion and Mental Health and, after a lifelong agnosticism, became a member of Christ Church (Episcopal) in Riverdale, New York.

== Field of research ==
Wolff’s first major contribution was the elucidation of the mechanism of migraine and other headaches of vascular origin. He was the first neurologist that supported the hypothesis that the aura arises from a vasoconstriction and the headache from a vasodilatation. In fact, vasodilators (amyl nitrite, carbon dioxide) abolished the aura temporarily or persistently, and vasoconstrictors (norepinephrine, ergotamine tartrate, caffeine) induced the aura.

Wolff was also interested in understanding the mind – body relationship, and established a separate category of illness to be defined as psychosomatic. There is a connection between nervous system and bodily diseases like peptic ulcer, ulcerative colitis, hypertension, etc.

However, Wolff's work on migraines also reveals sexism. In his discussion of patients, he tended to focus on his male patients, who he described as being ambitious, efficient, perfectionistic, and successful. He thought that they were working too hard; they should relax more and get more exercise. In contrast, women patients were described as inadequate, unsatisfied, and frigid. In women, unlike men, migraines were pathologized.

Wolff also headed the Society for the Investigation of Human Ecology, which received funding from the CIA to investigate the manipulation of human behavior. Dr. Wolff was a key participant in the CIA's MKUltra program, conducting research to discover effective interrogation techniques. He collaborated with the CIA to collect information on a wide variety of torture methods, and stated the intention that his research program would:

...assemble, collate, analyze and assimilate this information and will then undertake experimental investigations designed to develop new techniques of offensive/defensive intelligence use ... Potentially useful secret drugs (and various brain damaging procedures) will be similarly tested in order to ascertain the fundamental effect upon human brain function and upon the subject's mood ... Where any of the studies involve potential harm of the subject, we expect the Agency to make available suitable subjects and a proper place for the performance of the necessary experiments.

== Personal life ==
In 1934, Wolff married the well-known painter Isabel Bishop; the couple had a son, Remsen N. Wolff. In 1958, he was named the first occupant of the “Anne Parrish Titzel Chair” in Medicine at the Cornell University Medical College.

Wolff died suddenly of a stroke on February 21, 1962, in Washington D.C., during an interrogation of Francis Gary Powers.

== Selected publications ==
- Human Gastric Function, Harold G. Wolff, Stewart Wolf; New York, Oxford University Press, 1943.
- Headache and Other Head Pain, Harold G. Wolff; New York, oxford University Press, 1948 (First Publication)
- Pain Sensations and Reactions, James D. Hardy, Harold Wolff, Helen Goodwell; New York, Hafner, 1952.
- Stress and Disease, Harold G. Wolff; Springfield, IL, US, Charles C. Thomas Publisher, 1953.
