= Christopher Pyle =

American academic, journalist, civil rights specialist (born 1939)

Professor Emeritus Christopher H. Pyle
- Born: 1939 (age 86–87)
- Occupation: Professor
- Known for: 1970 congressional testimony on Army intelligence surveillance on US soil
- Awards: Polk Award et al.

Academic background
- Education: Bowdoin College (BA); Columbia University (LLB, MA, PhD)
- Website: https://www.mtholyoke.edu/directory/emeriti-retired-faculty/christopher-h-pyle

Christopher H. Pyle (born 1939) is a journalist and professor emeritus of Politics at Mount Holyoke College in South Hadley, Massachusetts. He testified to Congress about the use of military intelligence against civilians, worked for the Senate Judiciary Subcommittee on Constitutional Rights, as well as the Senate Committee on Government Oversight. He is the author of several books and Congressional reports on military intelligence and constitutional rights, and has testified numerous times before the U.S. Congress on issues of deportation and extradition.

== Background ==
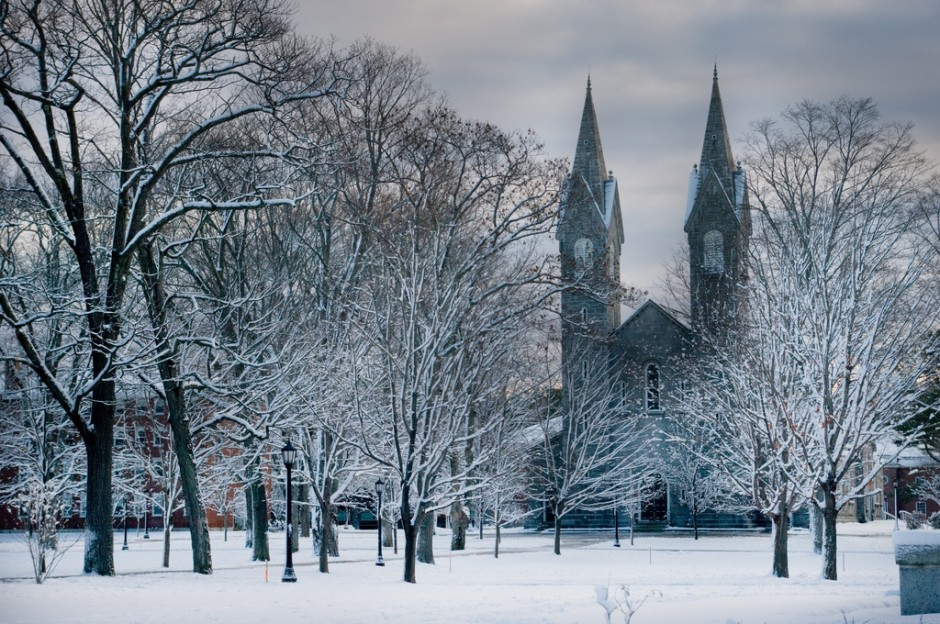
Pyle studied at Bowdoin College (here, Winter 2011)

Pyle graduated from Bowdoin College (1961) and earned LLB (1964), MA (1966), and PhD (1974) degrees at Columbia University.

== Career ==
=== Government Service ===
Church Committee report derived in part from findings made by analyst Pyle

In the 1960s, Pyle served in the United States Army as a captain in Army Intelligence Command (now United States Army Intelligence and Security Command).

In the 1960s while an Army captain in intelligence, Pyle learned that "Army intelligence had 1,500 plainclothes agents watching every demonstration of 20 people or more throughout the United States," (as later Pyle recounted on December 19, 2005, on Democracy Now and again on ABC News on January 6, 2006,) as part of a broad-based program of domestic spying. In January and July 1970, Pyle disclosed the Army's spying in articles that appeared in a new publication, Washington Monthly. The exposé went into syndication in more than 40 newspapers in the USA. While Pyle went on to interview more than 120 anonymous soldiers to document the practices, he himself came under attack in "bureaucratic retaliation" that included a spot on President Richard M. Nixon's "Enemies List." The upshot of investigations into Pyle resulted in the discovery by the Internal Revenue Service (IRS) that Pyle had overpaid his taxes.

Senator Sam Ervin investigated the Army's spying as chair of the Judiciary Subcommittee on Constitutional Rights, and Pyle worked as an analyst for his committee, testifying to Congress about his own findings (1971–1974). Ervin continued to investigate government activities; together with the Church Committee inquiries, these Congressional studies led to the drafting of the Foreign Intelligence Surveillance Act. Pyle served as a consultant for three Congressional committees in this area: the Subcommittee on Constitutional Rights on the Judiciary Committee (1971–1974), the Committee on Government Operations (1974), the Select Committee to Study Government Operations with Respect to Intelligence Activities (1975–1976). (Later in the 1970s Ervin served as chair of the Congressional committee that conducted hearings on the Watergate scandal.) He also helped draft the Privacy Act of 1974.

Pyle also served as a consultant to the Office of Technology Assessment as well as a constitutional expert before Senate and House Judiciary committees and the Senate Committee on Foreign Relations.

=== Academics ===
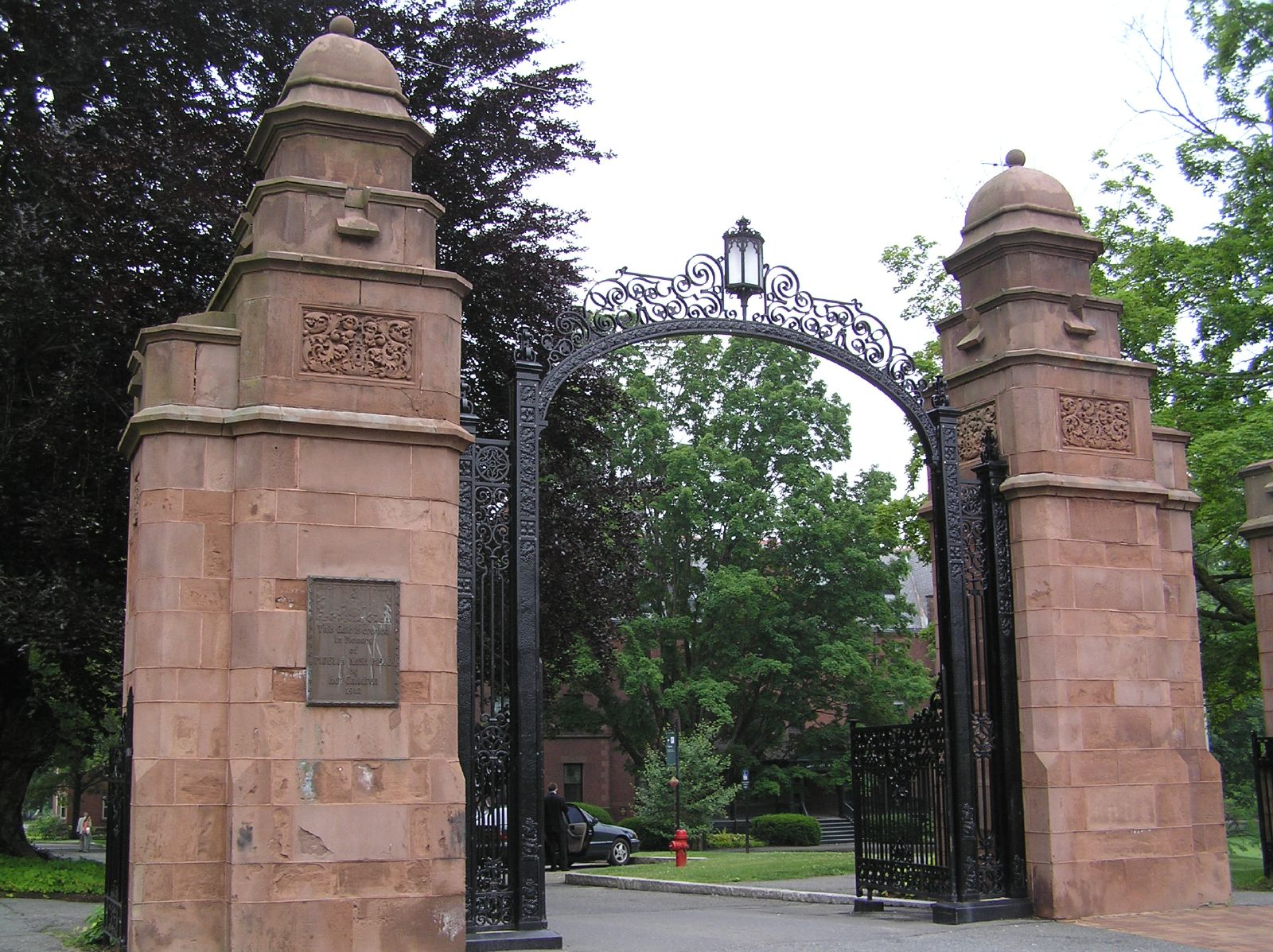
Pyle taught at Mount Holyoke College from 1976 to 2020

Pyle taught at the John Jay College of Criminal Justice from 1973 to 1976.

Pyle joined the faculty of Mount Holyoke College in 1976. He taught constitutional law, constitutional history, civil liberties, American politics, American political thought, and American bureaucratic politics; he chaired Mount Holyoke's programs in American Studies and Complex Organizations and the Department of Politics (2011–2012). He retired from Mount Holyoke in 2020.

Pyle has taught politics to intelligence agents in the army; to policemen at the John Jay College of Criminal Justice; undergraduates at University College, Dublin; law students at Harvard University, and graduate students at Universidad Complutense de Madrid.

== Public service ==
Pyle is a member of the board of directors of the ACLU of Massachusetts.

In 2004, Pyle was elected chairman of the board of the Petra Foundation, a national organization that recognizes and assists "unsung heroes" who make extraordinary contributions to social justice. He also chaired its awards committee.

== Awards and recognition ==
Awards:

- 1970: Hillman Prize for investigative journalism
- 1971: Polk Award for investigative journalism
- 2002: "Outstanding Academic Title," Choice, for Extradition, Politics and Human Rights (2001)
- 2004: Luther Knight Mcnair Award from ACLU Massachusetts for contributions as "teacher, scholar, and model citizen activist"
- 2007: Distinguished teaching award from Mt. Holyoke

Fellowships and Grants: Pyle has received the following:

- Russell Sage Foundation
- Mellon Foundation
- National Endowment for the Humanities
- Institute for the Study of World Politics
- Aspen Institute
- Fulbright Program

== Works ==
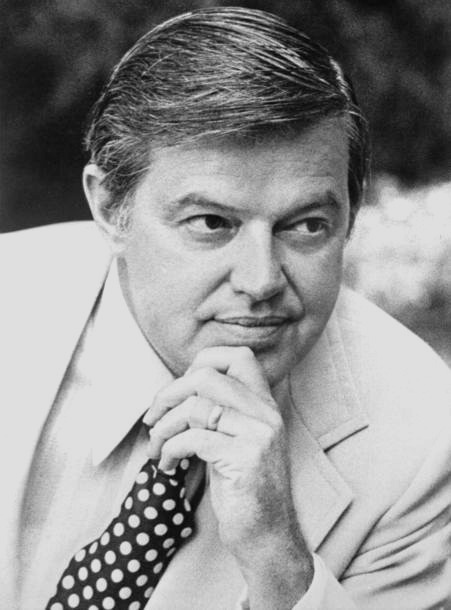
Pyle made many of his congressional reports for US Senator Frank Church (undated photo)

Books: Pyle has written several books on military surveillance, extradition, and issues related to the use of torture in intelligence gathering in the US war on terror, including:

- The President, Congress and the Constitution with Richard Pious (1984) ISBN 0-02-925380-2
- Military Surveillance of Civilian Politics, 1967-1970 (American legal and constitutional history) (1986) ISBN 0-8240-8290-7
- Extradition, Politics, and Human Rights (2001) ISBN 1-56639-823-1
- Getting Away with Torture: Secret Government, War Crimes, and the Rule of Law (Potomac Books Inc. (2008) ISBN 1-59797-387-4; ISBN 978-1-59797-387-8
- The Constitution under Siege with Richard Pious (2010)

Congressional Testimony:

- "The Domestic Intelligence Community" (1971)
- "CONUS Intelligence: A Case of Military Overkill" (1971)
- "S.2318 and the Military's Legitimate Intelligence Needs" (1974)
- Statement on Proposed Privacy Legislation (1974)
- "COINTELPRO, Preventive Action, and Proposals for Reform" (1976)
- "The Foreign Intelligence Bill of 1977 (S.1566)" (1978)
- "The FBI Charter: A Section-by-Section Analysis" (1979)
- "Provision of H.R. 3519 Regarding Military Assistance to Civilian" (1981)
- "Extradition and Political Crimes" (1981)
- "Extradition and Political Crimes" (1982)
- "The Extradition Act of 1982" (1982)
- "Terrorism and Political Crimes Defense to Extradition" (1982)
- "Extradition, Political Crimes, and the Rule of Non-Inquiry" (1982)
- "The Defense Department's Polygraph Regulations of 1982" (1982)

Congressional Reports:

- Army Surveillance of Civilians: A Documentary Analysis with Lawrence Baskir (1972)
- Military Surveillance of Civilian Politics (1973)
- "Extradition, Political Crimes, and the U.K. Treaty" (1985)

Articles:
Pyle has written for hundreds of newspapers, including the New York Times, Washington Post, Wall Street Journal, and Los Angeles Times, as well as magazines and journals including The Nation, Washington Monthly, Civil Liberties Review, Foreign Policy, American Political Science Review, Political Science Quarterly, and Boston University Law Review, including:

- "How to Brief a Case" (1982)
- "Be Afraid, Be Very Afraid, of Spying by U.S. Army" (2003)
- "The Intelligence Revolution" (2013)
