= Executive Order 11905 =

United States Foreign Intelligence Activities

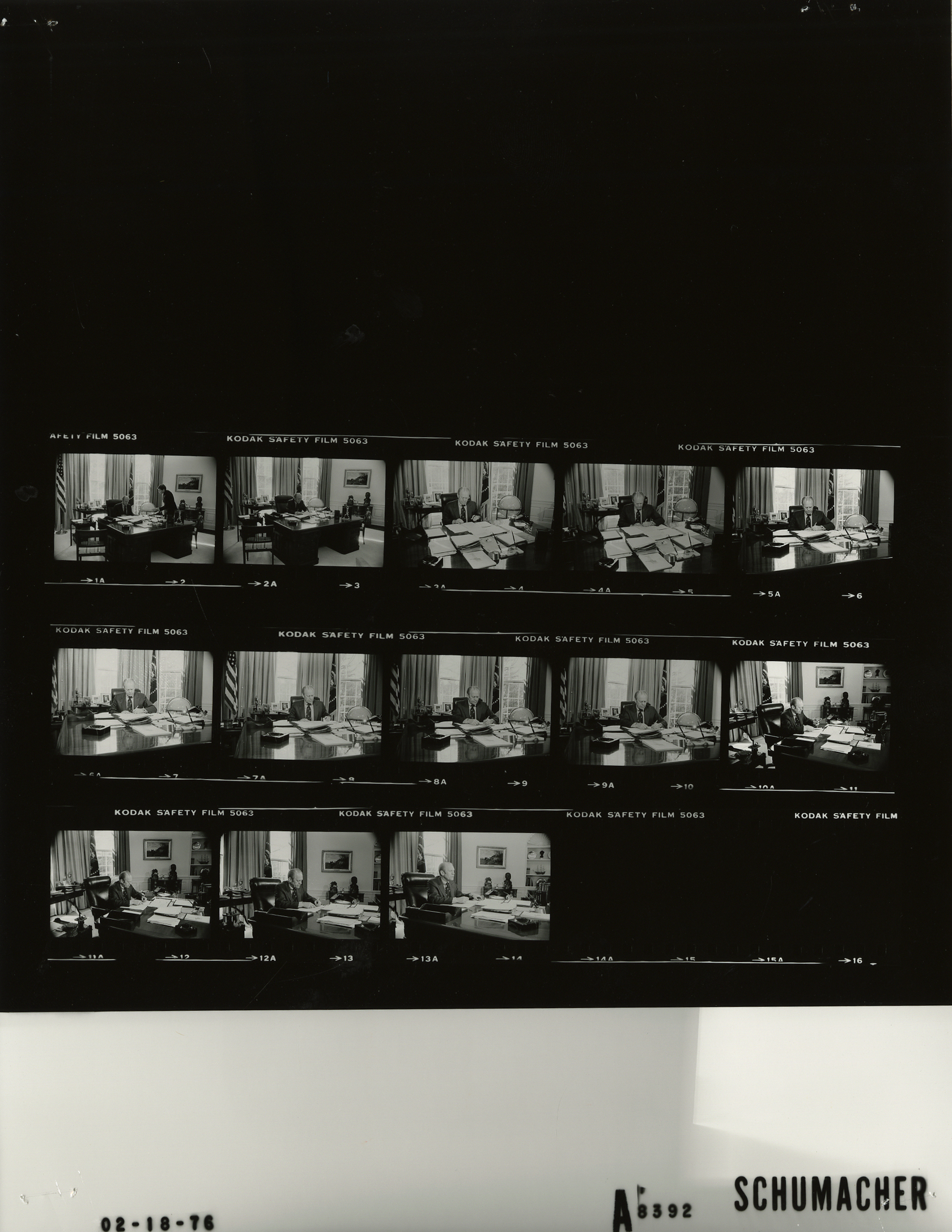
Contact sheet of Ford signing the order

Executive Order 11905 is a United States Presidential Executive Order signed on February 18, 1976, by President Gerald R. Ford in an effort to reform the United States Intelligence Community, improve oversight on foreign intelligence activities, and ban political assassination. Much of this EO would be changed or strengthened by Jimmy Carter's Executive Order 12036 in 1978.

== Background ==
The Executive Order was created and signed by Gerald Ford after the Church Committee and Pike Committee had divulged secrets about the U.S. Intelligence Community in the 1970s, particularly regarding the Central Intelligence Agency's assassination operations. The committees had been investigating the CIA's activity and EO 11905 was signed in an attempt to ban assassination and reform the intelligence community.

== Intelligence reforms ==
EO 11905 made four major changes to the intelligence community but would not bring overwhelming, effective reform. First, the EO created a new National Security Committee on Foreign Intelligence, to be chaired by the Director of Central Intelligence. Second, the EO replaced the 40 Committee, which was responsible for oversight of covert activities, with the Operations Advisory Group. The Operations Advisory Group would have similar responsibilities and be composed of senior White House, CIA, State Department and Department of Defense representatives. Third, the EO created a part-time Intelligence Oversight Board which was initially chaired by the former ambassador Robert Daniel Murphy. The chair of the Intelligence Oversight Board was to report illegal activity to the Attorney General and improprieties to the President.

== Assassination ban ==
The order instituted a ban on assassination: "No employee of the United States Government shall engage in, or conspire to engage in, political assassination." This provision would be superseded and strengthened with Executive Order 12036.
