= United States President's Commission on CIA Activities within the United States =

Panel investigating intelligence activities within the U.S.

Rockefeller Commission
- United States President's Commission on CIA Activities within the United States

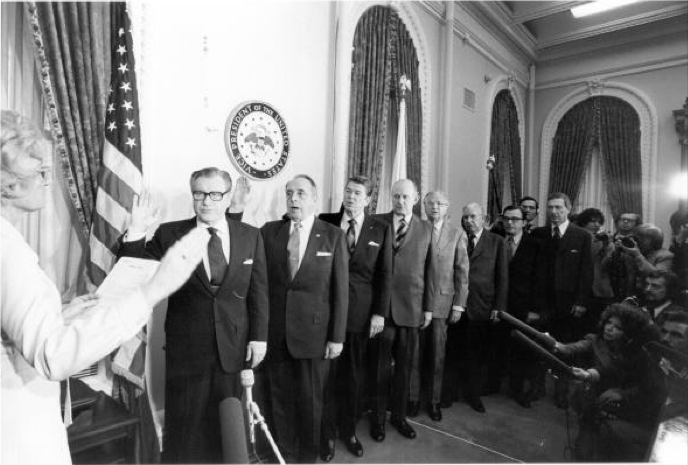
- Swearing-in of the Rockefeller Commission in 1975: Nelson A. Rockefeller, Lyman L. Lemnitzer, Ronald Reagan, Edgar F. Shannon Jr., David W. Belin, John T. Connor, C. Douglas Dillon, Erwin N. Griswold, and Lane Kirkland

History
- Established by: Gerald Ford on January 4, 1975

Membership
- Chairperson: Nelson Rockefeller
- Other committee members: Lyman L. Lemnitzer; Ronald Reagan; Edgar F. Shannon Jr.; David W. Belin; John T. Connor; C. Douglas Dillon; Erwin N. Griswold; Lane Kirkland

The United States President's Commission on CIA Activities within the United States was ordained by President Gerald Ford in 1975 to investigate the activities of the Central Intelligence Agency and other intelligence agencies within the United States. The Presidential Commission was led by Vice President Nelson Rockefeller, from whom it gained the nickname the Rockefeller Commission.

The commission was created in response to a December 1974 report in The New York Times that the CIA had conducted illegal domestic activities, including experiments on US citizens, during the 1960s. The commission issued a single report in 1975, touching upon certain CIA abuses including mail opening and surveillance of domestic dissident groups. It also publicized Project MKUltra, a CIA mind control research program.

Several weeks later, committees were established in the House and Senate for a similar purpose. White House Personnel, including future vice president Dick Cheney, edited the results, excluding many of the commission's findings from the final report. Some of these findings were included in later reports by the Congressional Committees.

Before it was even released, the report faced scrutiny from the media, and was deemed a "whitewash". The investigation was intended to be independent of Presidential interference, but the findings and recommendations included in the final report were highly altered from what was chosen by the commission itself. It was ultimately superseded in notability by the more substantial Church Committee in what became known as the "Year of Intelligence".

== Background ==
In 1974, a New York Times article was published that accused the CIA of illegal operations committed against US citizens. Authored by Seymour M. Hersh, it documented an intelligence operation against the anti-war movement, as well as "break-ins, wiretapping and the surreptitious inspection of mail" conducted since the 1950s. According to former CIA Official Cord Meyer, these disclosures "Convinced large sections of the American public that the CIA had become a domestic Gestapo and stimulated an overwhelming demand for the wide-ranging congressional investigations that were to follow."

Hersh had been tipped off to the possibility of an "in house operation" by an unidentified member of the CIA in spring of 1974. He embarked on an investigation, speaking to sources that included CIA Chief of Counterintelligence James Angleton. Although he was not aware of its existence, Hersh uncovered much information that had been documented in the "Family Jewels", a report ordered by Director of Central Intelligence William Colby that chronicled CIA abuses over the past 25 years. The report would not be formally revealed to the public until 2007.

=== Monitoring of anti-war movement and Project MINARET ===
The article alleged that CIA agents had followed and photographed participants in the antiwar movement, as well as other demonstrations. It also reported that the CIA "set up a network of informants who were ordered to penetrate antiwar groups", and even placed an avowedly anti-war congressperson under surveillance while putting other lawmakers in a dossier on dissident Americans.

Instituted in 1967 by the NSA, Project MINARET's purpose was to document "Soviet, Chinese, and North Vietnamese influence over the militant civil rights and anti–Vietnam War movements" for the CIA and FBI, according to historian Donald Critchlow. The NSA provided CIA and FBI officials with reports of intercepted international communications by certain individuals in these movements. NSA officials stipulated that FBI and CIA agents must destroy or return these reports within two weeks of receiving them. The NSA also required that "the reports not be 'identified with the National Security Agency' and that all records relating to this program were 'not serialize[d]' or filed with other NSA records, were classified 'Top Secret,' and were stamped 'Background Use Only'... because they recognized that this interception program violated the Communications Act of 1934."

=== MKUltra ===
Throughout the 1950s and 60s, the CIA conducted Project MKUltra, consisting of illegal experiments on unwitting subjects, largely American but including Canadian and Danish citizens, as well as CIA detainees at foreign sites. The purpose of these experiments was to develop new interrogation techniques based on mind control, particularly through a "truth drug." Subjects were administered high doses of LSD, as well as more extreme forms of torture overseas such as "electroshock, extremes of temperature, [and] sensory isolation."

=== Assassinations ===
The assassination of President John F. Kennedy had originally been investigated by the Warren Commission. Some of its elements, specifically the backward head snap seen in the Zapruder film and the possible presence of CIA operatives in Dallas, were addressed in the Rockefeller Commission. The commission also found evidence of CIA plans to assassinate Cuban President Fidel Castro, Dominican Republic President Rafael Trujillo, and mentions of Congolese President Patrice Lumumba and Indonesia's President Sukarno.

=== Commission establishment ===
Dick Cheney encouraged President Ford to create the commission, laying out four goals in a December 27, 1974, note: to examine the charges against the CIA, to avoid being "tarnished by controversy," to install "safeguards on intelligence" and to ensure the CIA's ability to operate was not inhibited.

Ford appointed his vice president, Nelson Rockefeller, to head the commission. Future president and former governor of California Ronald Reagan was chosen as a member, along with former chairman of the Joint Chiefs of Staff General Lyman Lemnitzer. Dean Rusk turned down a membership request from the White House. Representative Samuel Stratton volunteered, but neither he nor any other members of Congress were selected. Generals Matthew Ridgway and Maxwell Taylor were both considered, but Lemnitzer was chosen instead. The commission was established on January 4, 1975.

In a dinner with New York Times executives and editors later that January, Gerald Ford revealed the issue of CIA assassination plots, sparking media and public interest in the subject and injecting it into the "Year of Intelligence."

== Investigation ==
=== Operation Mongoose, Castro assassination attempts and Cuban operations ===
According to the Gerald R. Ford Presidential Library & Museum, the CIA, along with the State Department, Defense Intelligence Agency, and Justice Department provided the commission documents on the planning of covert operations in Cuba, including assassination attempts on Fidel Castro, from 1960 to 1964. These documents largely dealt with Operation Mongoose, along with the Bay of Pigs invasion and the Cuban missile crisis. Details such as minutes of meetings of anti-Castro planning groups, "reports on their operations, and memoranda between the individuals involved" were included.

Furthermore, the Ford Library holds "transcripts of sworn testimony and interviews conducted by Rockefeller Commission staff with former CIA, State Department, and Defense Department officials from the 1960s regarding what they knew about plans to assassinate foreign leaders and about the connection between the Cuba operations and organized crime."

=== Kennedy assassination ===
The commission investigated allegations that the CIA was involved in the assassination of President Kennedy. These included claims of CIA relationships with Lee Harvey Oswald and Jack Ruby. Furthermore, the alleged presence of CIA Agents E. Howard Hunt and Frank Sturgis in Dallas at the time of the assassination, and allegations that they had fired the "shots from the grassy knoll", were investigated.

According to the Gerald R. Ford Presidential Library & Museum, "The Commission heard testimony, taped interviews, took depositions, consulted experts in forensic pathology and ballistics, examined photographic evidence, and requested documents from various intelligence and law enforcement agencies." Witness testimonies and exhibits, many of which were unsolicited, were utilized. The Zapruder film was analyzed, along with other photographs and documents from agencies including the CIA, and Kennedy's autopsy materials were examined by a panel of medical consultants. The commission ultimately upheld the Warren Commission's finding that there was one assassin and found no link between the CIA and Oswald or Ruby, calling the allegations "farfetched speculation."

=== Relationship with Church Committee and dissolution ===
As of mid-April 1975, Commission Lawyer David Belin "expected to have the assassination portion of the panel report complete by the end of the month. He so informed White House officials. However, the CIA dragged its feet on providing materials, and Secretary of State Henry Kissinger, who initially promised cooperation, provided little", according to the National Security archive.

The commission had an at times contentious relationship with the Church Committee, as both were seeking out the same CIA documents, including the "Family Jewels". This went as far as Senator Church speculating that documents were being withheld from his committee by Rockefeller's. This led him, along with Senator John Tower, Committee Chief Counsel Fritz Schwartz and Minority Counsel Smothers, to personally visit Vice President Rockefeller in early May 1975. The committee members requested access to the evidence and transcripts possessed by the Rockefeller Commission but were denied by the Vice President, who cited the need for the President himself to grant them access. Ford had ordered the commission to extend its life by two months in order to investigate CIA assassinations, but on May 25 the commission moved to drop the assassinations and close its investigation. On June 9 the President publicly promised the Rockefeller Commission's files to the Church Committee, and they were delivered after two weeks and additional requests.

Even after the Rockefeller investigation ended, Church Committee's members complained in private that they were being denied access to CIA documents by both the White House and the agency itself, receiving less access than the Rockefeller Commission had.

=== CIA cooperation ===
The investigators sought CIA documents on assassination plots conducted in its history and information on administrative routines and questioned key witnesses. One of these witnesses, CIA lawyer John S. Warner, admitted that "the agency had 'no specific authorization' to conduct assassinations." He added that he was "'not clear' that a president had the constitutional authority to order an assassination, though that 'might' lie within his powers."

Peter Clapper, director of public affairs for the commission, in a message to David Belin, "criticized the CIA for the many holes in its written records" and asserted that "the Agency did not in every case cooperate fully with the Commission.'" He ultimately dismissed the agency as less than trustworthy. However, he did admit that the commission had "largely a public relations job," as opposed to the reform it ostensibly pursued.

Despite misgivings, Clapper laid extensive potential reforms to the CIA. This included legislation that prevented it from "withholding intelligence", as well as destroying records. In the realm of civil rights, he also asserted that Agents should be required to report any harassment of American citizens to the President, that only essential mail and files should be seized, and that "the civil rights of foreign citizens who defect to the United States" should be protected.

His final proposition was that of an "Anti-Murder Amendment," in reference to the contentious issue of CIA-sponsored assassinations of foreign, and potentially even American, politicians and leaders. The Amendment would ensure "that no agency of the U.S. Government will assassinate or plot to assassinate foreign leaders in time of peace ... The statute should prohibit employees and contractors of all agencies involved in gathering foreign intelligence from consideration of murder in peacetime."

=== White House interference and final report ===
The commission's final report was released on June 11, and internal White House and commission documents later showed that the Ford White House significantly altered it. Future vice president Dick Cheney edited it, and an 86-page section on CIA Assassination Plots was removed. Both the White House and leaders of the commission itself significantly hampered the investigation over objections by senior lawyers and commission staff.

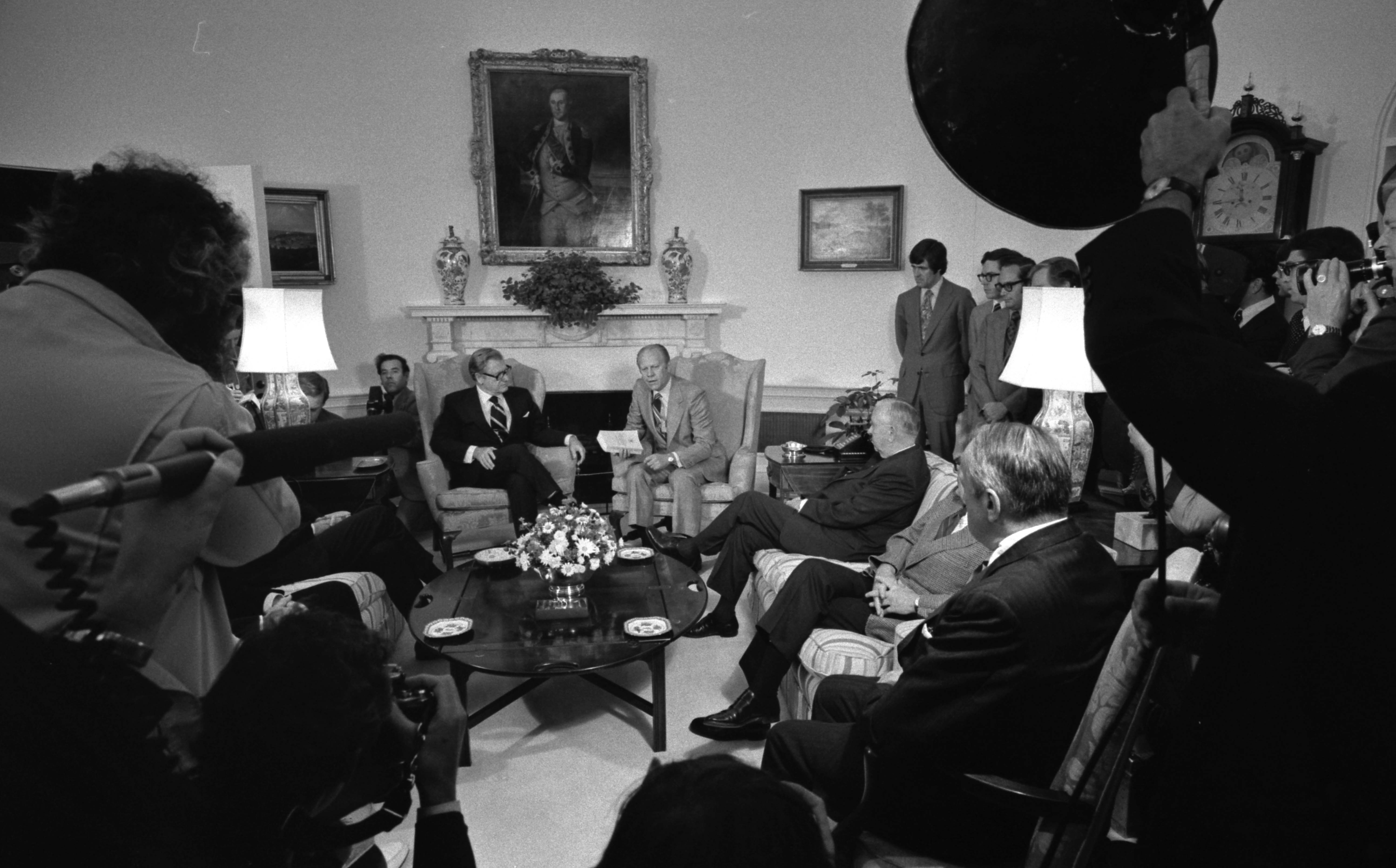
"President Ford participates in a ceremony to receive the Report of the Commission on CIA Activities within the United States (Rockefeller Commission) from Vice President Nelson A. Rockefeller and the committee members. June 6, 1975" Courtesy of the Gerald R Ford Presidential Library & Museum

According to the National Security Archive, the original report determined illegal and explicitly called many intelligence agency actions “unlawful,” but the edit instead mentioned actions that only exceeded agencies' statutory authority. The one exception to this was in the case of drug experiments, which changed statements that these were outside of CIA authority to say they had been “illegal.” It also contained a blanket finding that CIA dossiers on American citizens and infiltration of anti-war groups were “improper.” This was edited by the White House to indicate that the “standards applied” to “many” records gathered about the antiwar movement had resulted in materials “not needed for legitimate intelligence or security purposes.” Furthermore, recommendation that applicants for agency positions and foreign nationals acting on behalf of the CIA be informed more clearly that they could be subjects of U.S. security investigations was eliminated by the White House.

The White House also added recommendations the Rockefeller panel had not voted. These included a recommendation for formation of new civilian agency committee to be formed to resolve concerns about “the use of CIA-developed intelligence collection mechanisms for domestic purposes.” The White House further sought to increase public trust by instructing intelligence agencies to periodically review their holdings of secret documents and attempt to declassify much material as possible.

White House editors eliminated a commentary by former solicitor general Erwin N. Griswold:

A detailed footnote quoted Griswold as saying that an underlying cause of the problems confronting the CIA was its pervasive atmosphere of secrecy, and recommending Congress consider making public the CIA budget. White House editors converted Griswold's statement into part of the main text which the entire Rockefeller panel had supposedly agreed upon, and used it to buttress a recommendation to create a joint committee of the Congress to oversee the CIA and other intelligence agencies and went on to Recommendation 4 — that Congress consider making the CIA budget, to some degree, public.

According to historians John Prados and Arturo Jimenez Bacardi:

The White House edit both put words into Rockefeller Commissioners' mouths and dispensed with concerns they had expressed. Apart from the substantive issues raised thereby these actions amounted to direct political interference with a presidential advisory panel. Ford may have been comfortable with his subordinates' maneuvers, but they helped drain credibility from the Commission's investigation, as the panel's own staff had warned in discussions of whether to include its assassinations report... In the end, in a complete reversal of the actual inquiry, the only assassination material to make it into the report concerned whether the CIA had conspired to assassinate President John F. Kennedy.

A 1977 Senate Document report stated that, following an internal CIA investigation into the death of Dr. Frank Olson, "DCI Allen Dulles sent a personal letter to the Chief of Technical Operations of the Technical Services Staff who had approved the experiment criticizing him for 'poor judgment.'" He also sent a letter to Dr. Gottleib. The Senate noted that the Rockefeller report incorrectly characterized these as "reprimands," when in reality they were explicitly not, and had no negative impact on the career advancement of their recipients in the following years.

== Legacy ==
In a May 27, 1975, memo to then-Deputy National Security Advisor General Brent Scowcroft, Senior National Security Council Staff Member Les Janka wrote that "Much of the press has already come to the conclusion that the Rockefeller Commission on the CIA will produce a 'white wash.' He argued that the President should act on, and even exceed, any recommendations by the commission in order to restore in it the public's trust and thereby prevent "a thorough and possibly shattering restructuring of the CIA's charter and organization" by the Church Commission:

We cannot tolerate a situation where the White House simply "studies" the recommendations of the Rockefeller Commission, lets charges of "white wash" build even further, and gives by default a mandate to Senator Church to come up with a "final solution" to the CIA problem.

Most evidence of how the investigation was internally hindered was not accessed until the 1990s. According to a National Security Archive Report, "Much of the work of securing release of the records was done by the John F. Kennedy Assassinations Records Board in the 1990s, and the documents were located at the National Archives and Records Administration at College Park, Maryland; or at the Gerald R. Ford Library in Ann Arbor, Michigan."

On July 18, 1975, over a month after the final report was released, The New York Times reported that unnamed staff sources within the Rockefeller Commission said that Sidney Gottlieb commanded the CIA's LSD experimentation program, was personally involved in the experiment that killed researcher Frank Olson, then destroyed the program's records in 1973.

President Ford issued an executive order on intelligence agencies and operations which included a prohibition on assassinations. This was followed by President Carter with executive orders on intelligence in May 1977 and January 1978. These widened the scope of the assassination prohibition by expanding it to ban "political assassinations" on government employees to assassinations by anyone working for or on behalf of the United States. This ban was repeated verbatim in President Reagan's 1981 E. O. 12333. The Reagan E.O. remains in force, with every subsequent president continuing the ban.

=== Church Committee ===
Under media pressure, Ford publicly turned over assassinations material to the Church Committee, which completed its report in October 1975. Historians John Prados and Arturo Jimenez Bacardi wrote:

President Ford passed investigative materials concerning assassinations along to the Church Committee of the United States Senate and then attempted—but failed—to suppress the Church Committee's report as well... The committee recommended that a prohibition on assassinations be written into law, even supplying language that could be used in such a statute. Their prohibition would have covered not only foreign officials but members of an “insurgent force, an unrecognized government, or a political party.

On October 31 President Ford wrote Senator Church to ask that the Church Committee's report on CIA Assassinations be kept secret, fearing "grievous harm to the national interest." The committee voted to reject this demand, and Church answered him on November 4, writing, “in my view the national interest is better served by letting the American people know the true and complete story ... We believe that foreign peoples will, upon sober reflection, admire our nation more for keeping faith with our democratic ideals than they will condemn us for the misconduct itself.” Nonetheless, on November 20 the Senate convened in a secret session to debate releasing the Church assassinations report, but took no vote on whether to hold its release.

Senator Church objected to President Fords executive order, arguing that "anything a president set by fiat could be changed by fiat as well, by means of a future executive action." However, the executive order has been upheld by all subsequent presidents.

=== Pike Committee ===
The House counterpart to the Church Committee and Rockefeller Commission was the Pike Committee. The White House initially denied it access to information, nearly igniting a legal crisis. Under threat of being sued, President Ford eventually allowed the Pike Committee to access CIA documents "on loan." However, Ford prevented the Committee from officially publishing its final report, and the House did not overrule him. Large excerpts of the report were leaked to The Village Voice and published on February 16, 1976. The Committee was ultimately succeeded by the Permanent Select Committee on Intelligence (HPSCI) on July 14, 1977.

== See also ==
- Church Committee
- COINTELPRO
- Family Jewels (Central Intelligence Agency)
- Human experimentation in the United States
- Human rights violations by the CIA
- Nedzi Committee
- Pike Committee
- Plausible denial
- Project MKUltra
- Hughes–Ryan Act
- Werner Spitz
