= Church Committee =

Committee investigating governmental abuses in the US intelligence community

Church Committee report (Book I: Foreign and Military Intelligence; PDF)

Church Committee report (Book II: Intelligence Activities and the Rights of Americans; PDF)

The Church Committee (formally the United States Senate Select Committee to Study Governmental Operations with Respect to Intelligence Activities) was a US Senate select committee in 1975 that investigated abuses by the Central Intelligence Agency (CIA), National Security Agency (NSA), Federal Bureau of Investigation (FBI), and the Internal Revenue Service (IRS). Chaired by Idaho senator Frank Church (D-ID), the committee was part of a series of investigations into intelligence abuses in 1975, dubbed the "Year of Intelligence", including its House counterpart, the Pike Committee, and the presidential Rockefeller Commission. The committee's efforts led to the establishment of the permanent US Senate Select Committee on Intelligence.

Revelations of the committee include Operation MKULTRA, which involved the drugging of US citizens as part of human experimentation on mind control; COINTELPRO, which involved the surveillance and infiltration of American political and civil-rights organizations; Family Jewels, a set of reports detailing potentially illegal, inappropriate and otherwise sensitive activities conducted by the CIA; and Operation Mockingbird, an alleged campaign during the early years of the Cold War designed to manipulate news media by recruiting journalists as assets in a propaganda campaign.

It also unearthed Project SHAMROCK, a program in which the major telecommunications companies shared their traffic with the NSA, and officially confirmed the existence of this signals intelligence agency to the public for the first time.

== Background ==
By the early years of the 1970s, a series of troubling reports had appeared in the press concerning U.S. intelligence activities. First came revelations by Army intelligence officer Christopher Pyle in January 1970 regarding the U.S. Army's spying on the civilian population in the United States. Senator Sam Ervin's investigations of military surveillance produced further revelations.

Then on December 22, 1974, The New York Times published a lengthy front-page article by investigative journalist Seymour Hersh detailing covert activities engaged in by the Central Intelligence Agency under Operation CHAOS to collect information on the political activities of American citizens.

The resulting uproar led to the creation of the Church Committee, which was approved by the Senate on January 27, 1975, on a vote of 82 to 4.

== Overview ==
The Church Committee's final report was published in April 1976 in six books. Also published were seven volumes of Church Committee hearings in the Senate.

Before the release of the final report, the committee also published an interim report titled "Alleged Assassination Plots Involving Foreign Leaders", which investigated alleged attempts to assassinate foreign leaders, including Patrice Lumumba of Zaire, Rafael Trujillo of the Dominican Republic, Ngo Dinh Diem of South Vietnam, Gen. René Schneider of Chile, and Fidel Castro of Cuba. President Gerald Ford urged the Senate to withhold the report from the public, but failed, and under recommendations and pressure by the committee, Ford issued Executive Order 11905 (ultimately replaced in 1981 by President Reagan's Executive Order 12333) to ban US sanctioned assassinations of foreign leaders.

In addition, the committee produced seven case studies on covert operations, but only the one on Chile was released, titled "Covert Action in Chile: 1963–1973". The rest were kept secret at CIA's request.

According to a declassified National Security Agency history, the Church Committee also helped to uncover the NSA's Watch List. The information for the list was compiled into the so-called "Rhyming Dictionary" of biographical information, which at its peak held millions of names—thousands of which were US citizens. Some prominent members of this list were Joanne Woodward, Thomas Watson, Walter Mondale, Art Buchwald, Arthur F. Burns, Gregory Peck, Otis G. Pike, Tom Wicker, Whitney Young, Howard Baker, Frank Church, David Dellinger, Ralph Abernathy, and others.

Another revelation of the committee was the discovery of Operation SHAMROCK, in which the major telecommunications companies shared their traffic with the NSA from 1945 to the early 1970s. The information gathered in this operation fed directly into the Watch List. In 1975, the committee decided to unilaterally declassify the particulars of this operation, against the objections of President Ford's administration.

Together, the Church Committee's reports have been said to constitute the most extensive review of intelligence activities ever made available to the public. Much of the contents were classified, but over 50,000 pages were declassified under the President John F. Kennedy Assassination Records Collection Act of 1992.

== Committee members ==
Majority (Democratic)	Minority (Republican)
Frank Church, Chairman, Idaho; Philip Hart, Michigan; Walter Mondale, Minnesota; Walter Huddleston, Kentucky; Robert Morgan, North Carolina; Gary Hart, Colorado	John Tower, Vice Chairman, Texas; Howard Baker, Tennessee; Barry Goldwater, Arizona; Charles Mathias, Maryland; Richard Schweiker, Pennsylvania

Members of the Church Committee

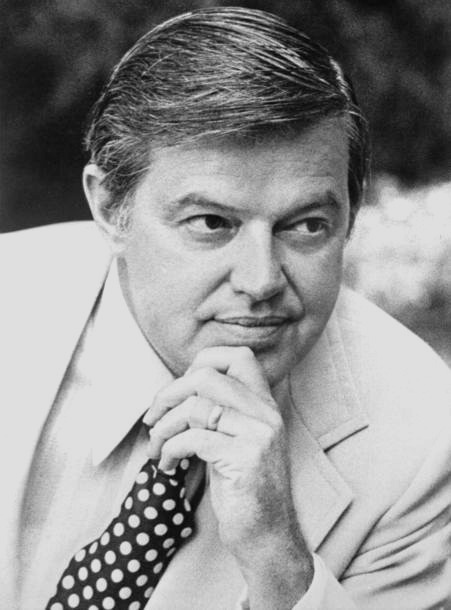
Frank Church

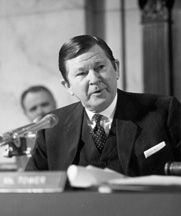
John Tower

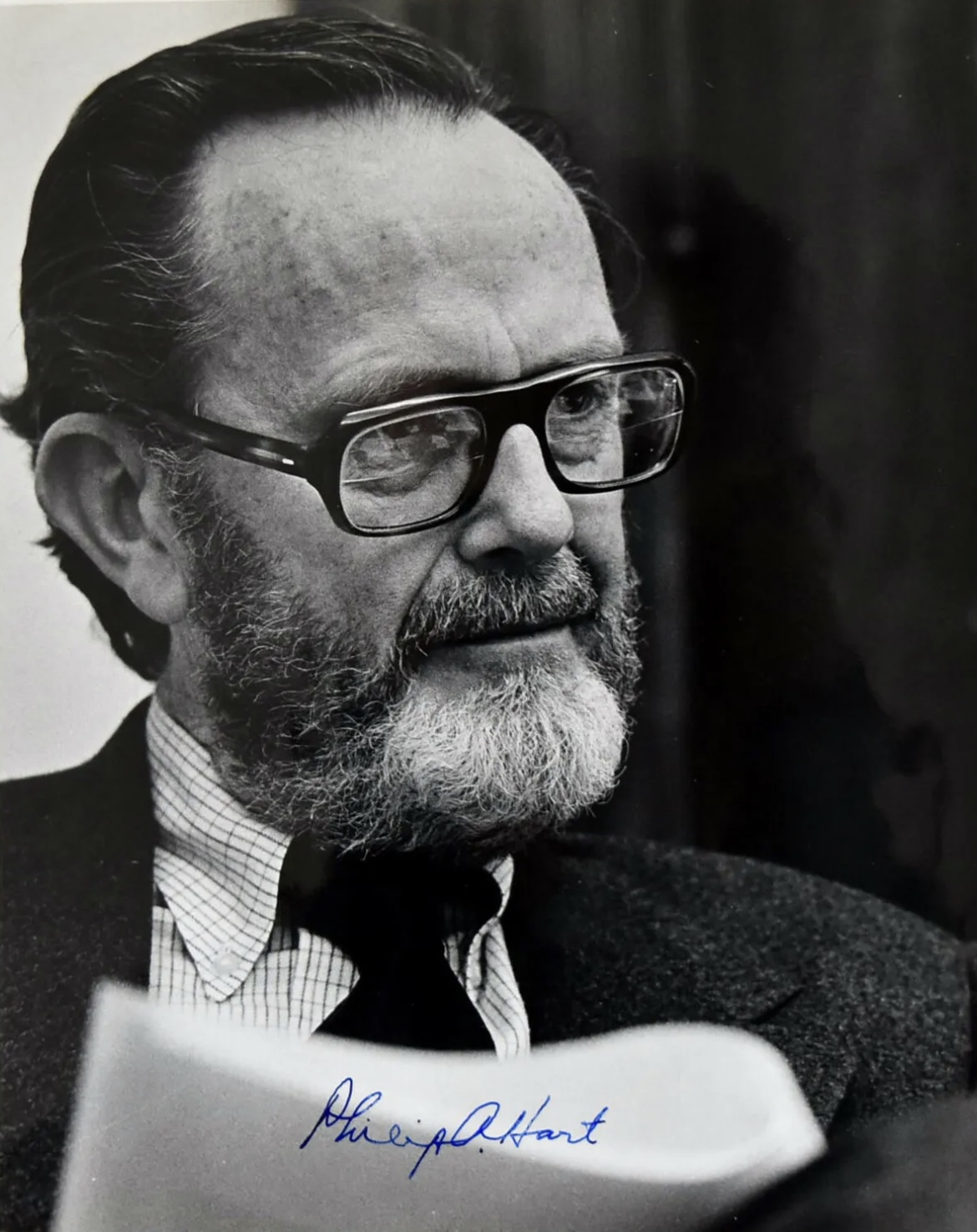
Philip Hart

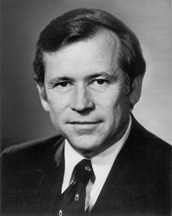
Howard Baker

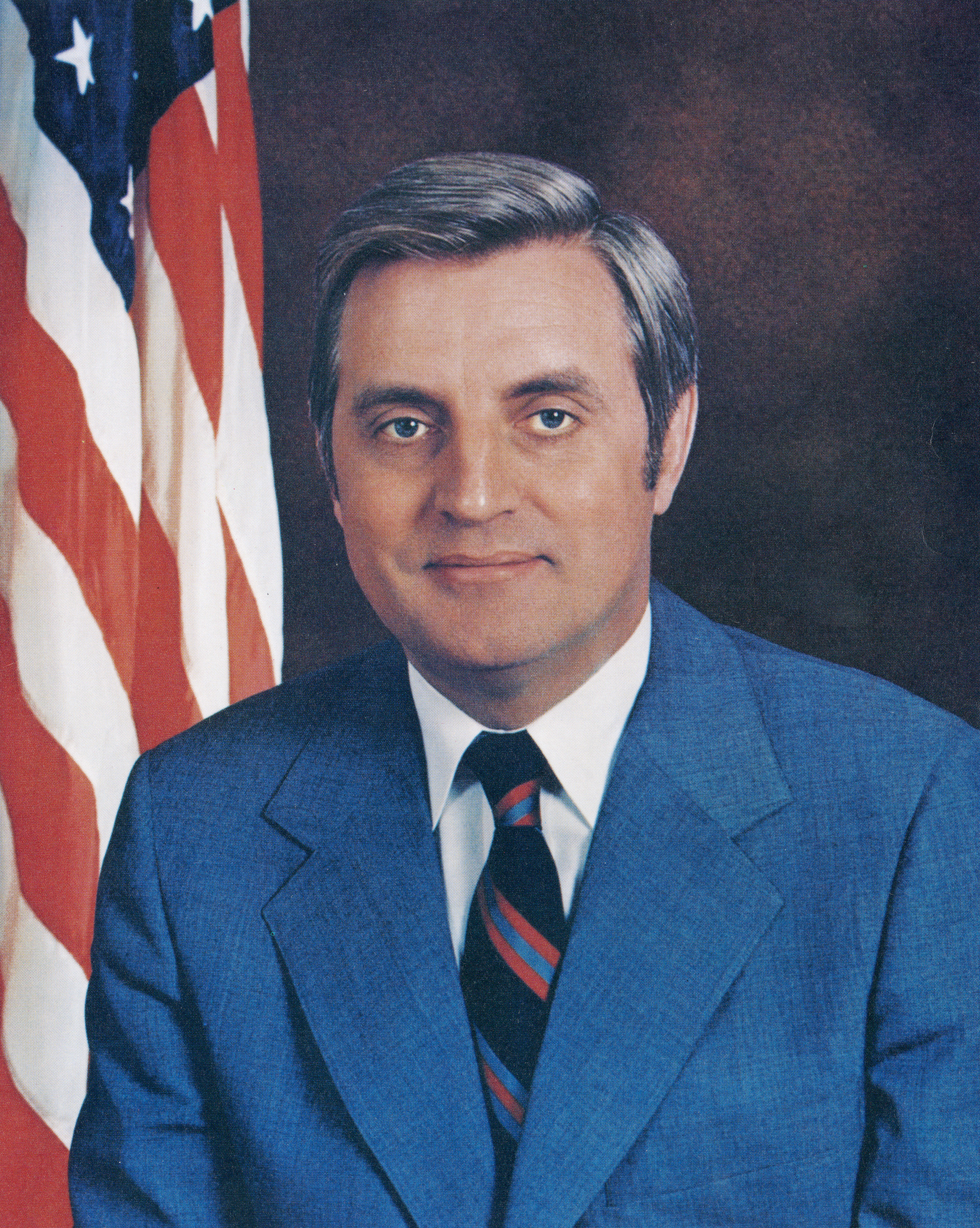
Walter Mondale

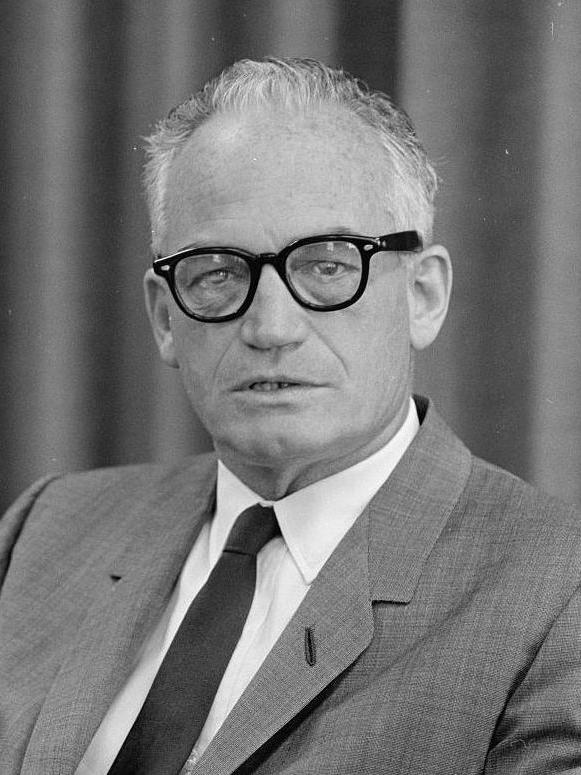
Barry Goldwater

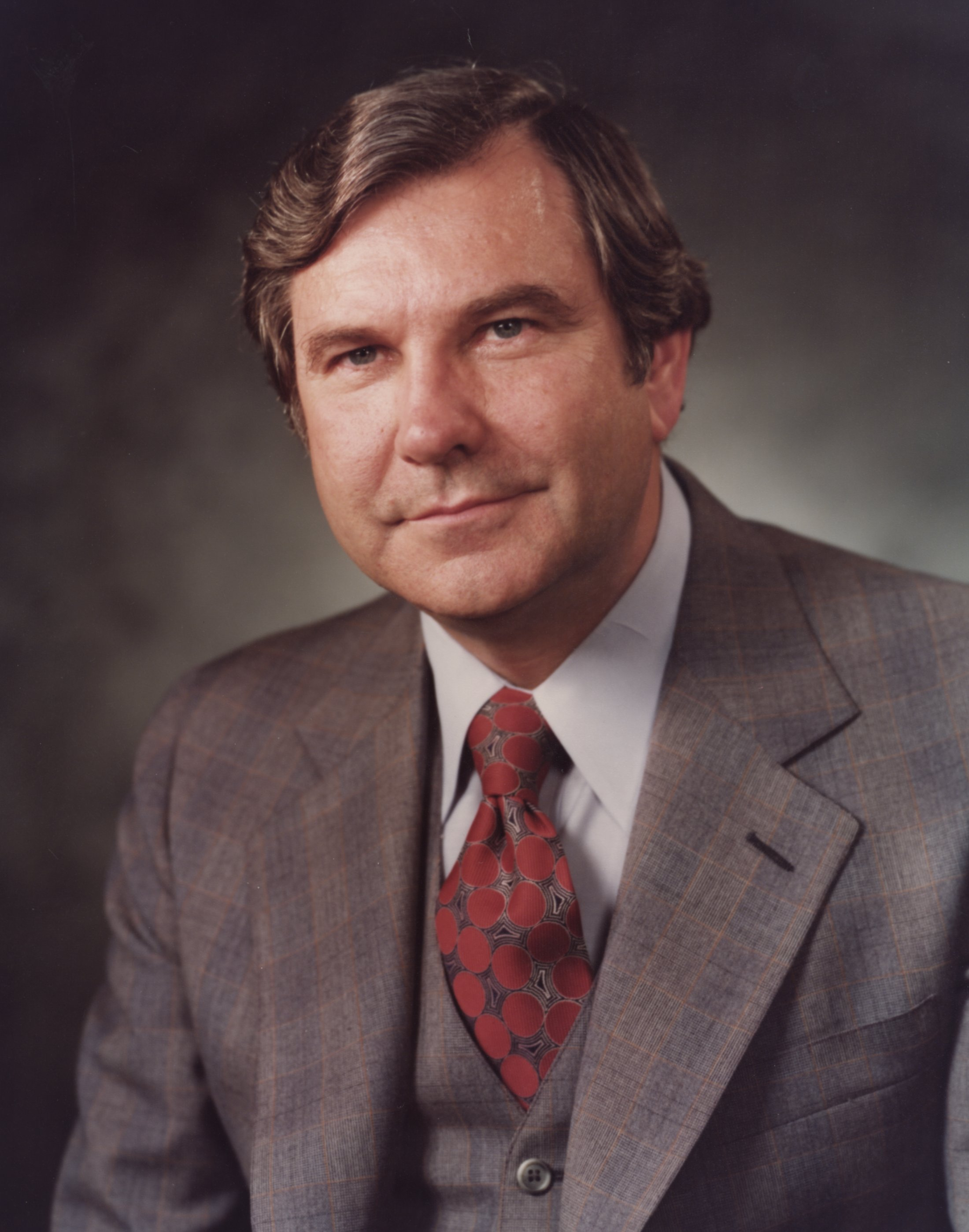
Walter Huddleston

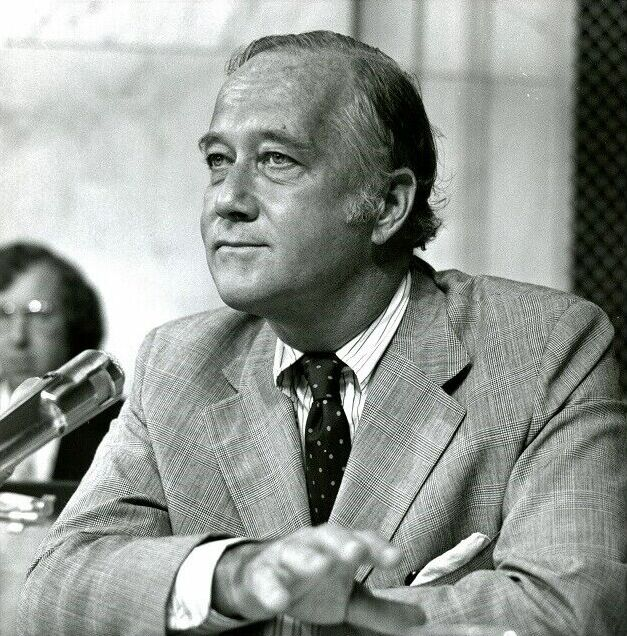
Charles Mathias

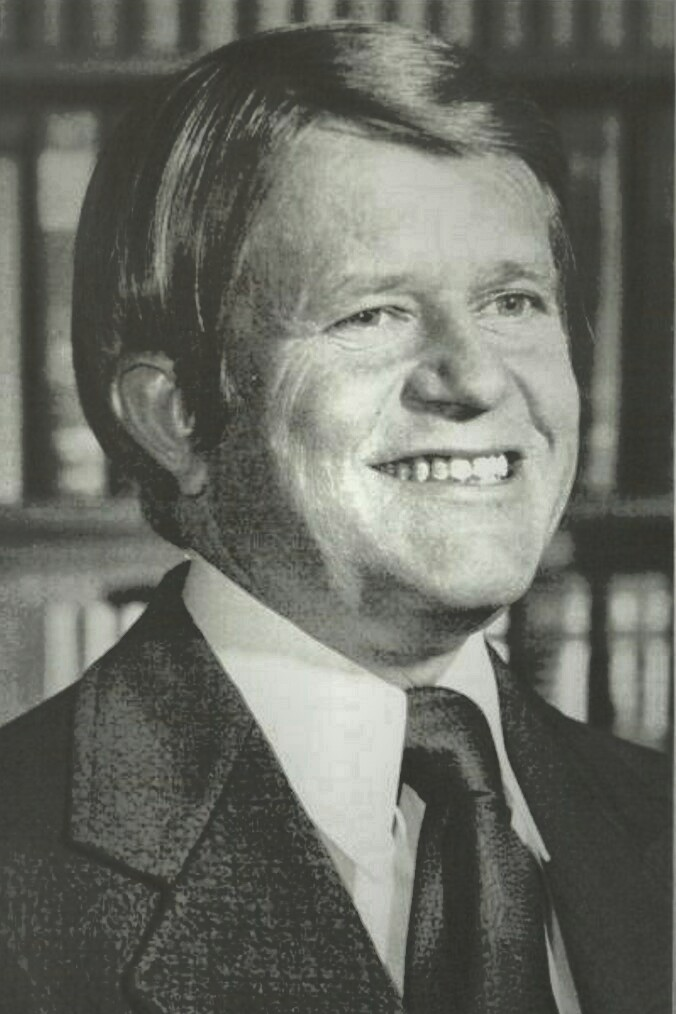
Robert Morgan

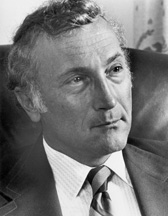
Richard Schweiker

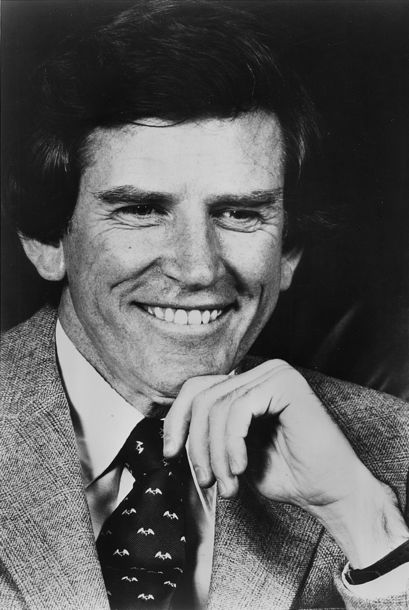
Gary Hart

== Investigation into the assassination of John F. Kennedy ==
The commission also carried out an investigation into the November 22, 1963, assassination of John F. Kennedy, questioning 50 witnesses and accessing 3,000 documents. It focused on the actions of the FBI and CIA, and their support for the Warren Commission.

The Church commission raised the question of the possible connection between the plans to assassinate political leaders abroad, particularly in Cuba, and that of the 35th President of the United States.

The Church Commission questioned the processes for obtaining information, blaming federal agencies for failing in their duties and responsibilities and concluding that the investigation into the assassination had been deficient.

It participated in the creation of the House Select Committee on Assassinations (HSCA), the second major investigation of the JFK assassination, from 1976 to 1979.

== Opening mail ==
The Church Committee learned that, beginning in the 1950s, the CIA and Federal Bureau of Investigation had intercepted, opened and photographed more than 215,000 pieces of mail by the time the program (called "HTLINGUAL") was shut down in 1973. This program was all done under the "mail covers" program (a mail cover is a process by which the government records—without any requirement for a warrant or for notification—all information on the outside of an envelope or package, including the name of the sender and the recipient). The Church report found that the CIA was careful about keeping the United States Postal Service from learning that government agents were opening mail. CIA agents moved mail to a private room to open the mail or in some cases opened envelopes at night after stuffing them in briefcases or in coat pockets to deceive postal officials.

== The Ford administration and the Church Committee ==
On May 9, 1975, the Church Committee decided to call acting CIA director William Colby. That same day Ford's top advisers (Henry Kissinger, Donald Rumsfeld, Philip W. Buchen, and John Marsh) drafted a recommendation that Colby be authorized to brief only rather than testify, and that he would be told to discuss only the general subject, with details of specific covert actions to be avoided except for realistic hypotheticals. But the Church Committee had full authority to call a hearing and require Colby's testimony. Ford and his top advisers met with Colby to prepare him for the hearing. Colby testified, "These last two months have placed American intelligence in danger. The almost hysterical excitement surrounding any news story mentioning CIA or referring even to a perfectly legitimate activity of CIA has raised a question whether secret intelligence operations can be conducted by the United States."

== Results of the investigation ==
On August 17, 1975 Senator Frank Church appeared on NBC's Meet the Press, and discussed the NSA, without mentioning it by name:

In the need to develop a capacity to know what potential enemies are doing, the United States government has perfected a technological capability that enables us to monitor the messages that go through the air. (...) Now, that is necessary and important to the United States as we look abroad at enemies or potential enemies. We must know, at the same time, that capability at any time could be turned around on the American people, and no American would have any privacy left: such is the capability to monitor everything—telephone conversations, telegrams, it doesn't matter. There would be no place to hide.

If this government ever became a tyranny, if a dictator ever took charge in this country, the technological capacity that the intelligence community has given the government could enable it to impose total tyranny, and there would be no way to fight back because the most careful effort to combine together in resistance to the government, no matter how privately it was done, is within the reach of the government to know. Such is the capability of this technology. (...)

I don't want to see this country ever go across the bridge. I know the capacity that is there to make tyranny total in America, and we must see to it that this agency and all agencies that possess this technology operate within the law and under proper supervision so that we never cross over that abyss. That is the abyss from which there is no return.

== Aftermath ==
As a result of the political pressure created by the revelations of the Church Committee and the Pike Committee investigations, President Gerald Ford issued Executive Order 11905. This executive order banned political assassinations: "No employee of the United States Government shall engage in, or conspire to engage in, political assassination." Senator Church criticized this move on the ground that any future president could easily set aside or change this executive order by a further executive order. Further, President Jimmy Carter issued Executive Order 12036, which in some ways expanded Executive Order 11905.

In 1977, the reporter Carl Bernstein wrote an article in the Rolling Stone magazine, stating that the relationship between the CIA and the media was far more extensive than what the Church Committee revealed. Bernstein said that the committee had covered it up, because it would have shown "embarrassing relationships in the 1950s and 1960s with some of the most powerful organizations and individuals in American journalism."

R. Emmett Tyrrell Jr., editor of the conservative magazine The American Spectator, wrote that the committee "betrayed CIA agents and operations." The committee had not received names, so had none to release, as confirmed by later CIA director George H. W. Bush. However, Senator Jim McClure used the allegation in the 1980 election, when Church was defeated.

The Committee's work has more recently been criticized after the September 11 attacks, for leading to legislation reducing the ability of the CIA to gather human intelligence. In response to such criticism, the chief counsel of the committee, Frederick A. O. Schwarz Jr., retorted with a book co-authored by Aziz Z. Huq, denouncing the Bush administration's use of 9/11 to make "monarchist claims" that are "unprecedented on this side of the North Atlantic".

In September 2006, the University of Kentucky hosted a forum called "Who's Watching the Spies? Intelligence Activities and the Rights of Americans", bringing together two Democratic committee members, former Vice President of the United States Walter Mondale and former US Senator Walter "Dee" Huddleston of Kentucky, and Schwarz to discuss the committee's work, its historical impact, and how it pertains to today's society.

== See also ==
- FBI–King suicide letter
- Hope Commission (established to investigate Australia's intelligence agencies)
- Hughes–Ryan Amendment
- Human rights violations by the CIA
- Assassination of John F. Kennedy
- Operation Gladio (included in the classified part of the report)
- Operation Mockingbird
- Presidential Emergency Action Documents
- Project Mockingbird
- The Shadow Factory
- Surveillance abuse
- Unethical human experimentation in the United States
- Special Activities Center (CIA)
- Arctic Frost investigation
- Edward Lansdale § Anti-Castro campaign
- Robert McNamara § Church Committee
