= Human rights violations by the CIA =

The Central Intelligence Agency (CIA) of the federal government of the United States has been involved in numerous actions which have been characterized as human rights violations or as contributing to human rights violations. Such actions include the training of paramilitary units and death squads, the maintenance of black sites across the world, and the use of torture.

== Training and support ==
The CIA has been involved in the support and training of military and paramilitary units that defend against enemies of US-backed governments in Latin America. Florencio Caballero, a former Honduran Army interrogator, said that he had been trained by the CIA, which The New York Times confirmed with US and Honduran officials. Much of his account was confirmed by three American officials and two Honduran officials. It may be the fullest account yet given of how army and police units were authorized to organize death squads that seized, interrogated, and killed suspected socialists. He said that while Argentine and Chilean trainers taught the Honduran Army kidnapping and elimination techniques, the CIA explicitly forbade the use of physical torture or assassination.

Caballero described the CIA role as ambiguous. "Caballero said his superior officers ordered him and other members of army intelligence units to conceal their participation in death squads from CIA advisers. He added that he was sent to Houston for six months in 1979 to be trained by CIA instructors in interrogation techniques. "They prepared me in interrogation to end the use of physical torture in Honduras – they taught psychological methods", Caballero said of his American training. "So when we had someone important, we hid him from the Americans, interrogated him ourselves, and then gave him to a death squad to kill."

John R. Stockwell, a CIA officer who left the Agency and became a public critic, said of the CIA field officers: "They do not meet the death squads on the streets where they are actually chopping up people or laying them down on the street and running trucks over their heads. The CIA people in San Salvador meet the police chiefs and the people who run the death squads, and they do liaise with them, they meet them beside the swimming pool of the villas. And it is a sophisticated, civilized kind of relationship. And they talk about their children, who are going to school at UCLA or Harvard and other schools, and they do not talk about the horrors of what is being done. They pretend like it is not true."

Human Rights Watch (HRW) asserted in a 2019 report that the CIA was backing death squads in Afghanistan. The report alleges that CIA-supported Afghan forces committed "summary executions and other grave abuses without accountability" over the course of more than a dozen night raids that took place between 2017 and 2019. The death squads allegedly committed "extrajudicial killings of civilians, forced disappearances of detainees, and attacks on healthcare facilities that treat insurgents," according to Vice's reporting on the contents of the HRW report. According to the same article, "The forces are recruited, equipped, trained, and deployed under the auspices of the CIA to target insurgents from the Taliban, Al Qaeda, and ISIS." The article also states these Afghan forces have the ability to call in US airstrikes, which have resulted in the deaths of civilians, including children, and have occurred in civilian areas, including at weddings, parks, and schools.

The CIA is also accused of human rights violations for supporting the overthrow of democratically elected governments such as in Iran, Chile and Guatemala. When the news of the September 1970 democratic election of socialist Salvador Allende in Chile reached the White House, Secretary of State Henry Kissinger referred to it as the "Autumn of Crises". The CIA led by Richard Helms was directed to "launch covert action with almost no preparation". A subsequent coup in 1973 by the Chilean armed forces with Augusto Pinochet leading the charge was orchestrated and retroactive interviews with participants "indicate a secret link between the Nixon White House and the military coup plotters".

== Interrogation techniques ==
The U.S. and suspected CIA "black sites" Extraordinary renditions allegedly have been carried out from these countries Detainees have allegedly been transported through these countries Detainees have allegedly arrived in these countries Sources: Amnesty International Human Rights Watch

Following the September 11 attacks, the CIA engaged in the torture of detainees at CIA-run black sites and sent detainees to be tortured by friendly governments in a manner contravening both US and international law.

The existence of black sites was first published by The Washington Post in November 2005 following reports by human rights NGOs. US president George W. Bush acknowledged the existence of secret prisons operated by the CIA during a speech on September 6, 2006.

Administration officials, including Deputy Assistant Attorney General John Yoo, as well as prominent legal scholars such as Alan Dershowitz, publicly defended and justified the use of torture against terrorism suspects.

In May 2018, The European Court of Human Rights ruled that the countries of Romania and Lithuania were involved in torture activities perpetrated by the CIA. The two countries were found to have run "black site" torture rooms and detention facilities therefore committing grave human rights abuses. In Romania, the secret facility was located at Northern Bucharest. In Lithuania, the black site was a guesthouse in the capital city of Vilnius which operated as early as 2002. In December 2014, the US Senate Select Committee on Intelligence filed a report which included torture details involving Saudi Arabian nationals Abd al-Rahim al-Nashiri suspected of masterminding the bombing of the US Navy guided-missile destroyer USS Cole in Yemen and Abu Zubaydah, an alleged Al-Qaeda terrorist. The European tribunal said the "two high-value prisoners" were "subjected to maltreatment and arbitrary incarceration at the CIA black site. Hence, the Lithuania and Romanian governments violated the European Convention on Human Rights' ban on torture. Authorities in Lithuania also permitted the transport of Zubaydah to a secret prison in Afghanistan for additional abuse. In a separate decision, the European court learned Romania was knowledgeable of Nashiri's torture by the CIA in its own country.

Along with independent commissions that have condemned the actions of the CIA to use torture as a strategic policy, more recent assessments have shown the unintended consequences of such methods. The late Senator John McCain, for instance, asked a detained senior Al-Qaeda official how they had gained a foothold in Iraq and he replied: "The chaos after the success of the initial invasion and the greatest recruiting tool: Abu Ghraib". Abu Ghraib, the US-run prison in Iraq became a propaganda tool for terrorist organizations. Even al-Zarqawi, the former leader of Al-Qaeda in Iraq, stated that the beheading of American Nicholas Berg came in retaliation for the "abuses at Abu Ghraib". A further and perhaps even more consequential result of the CIA's use of torture to accomplish strategic ends is its proven link in "making it harder to recruit potential Iraqi allies". Such methods are not only deemed human rights violations, but have also shown to be less than ideal in the US's policy objectives.

=== Torture techniques ===
The CIA has funded academic research, unwitting in some cases, used to develop methods of torture. Between 2002 to 2007, as part of the war on terror, CIA personnel employed so-called "enhanced interrogation techniques", a euphemism for torture. Various officials of the George W. Bush administration argued that "harsh" techniques such as waterboarding were not torture, or that the end objectives of the War against Terror justified those means. There was considerable domestic and international protest against such practices. The United Nations' Special Rapporteur on Torture, HRW, and American legal scholars called for the prosecution of Bush administration officials who ordered torture, or who conspired to provide legal cover for torture, as well as CIA and DOD personnel and contract workers who carried it out.

Torture and harsh imprisonment accusations (as well as documented examples) were not limited to the recent War on Terror. Yuri Nosenko, a Soviet KGB defector, was held in stark conditions of solitary confinement in a clandestine CIA facility in the continental US from 1966 to 1969.

==== Waterboarding ====
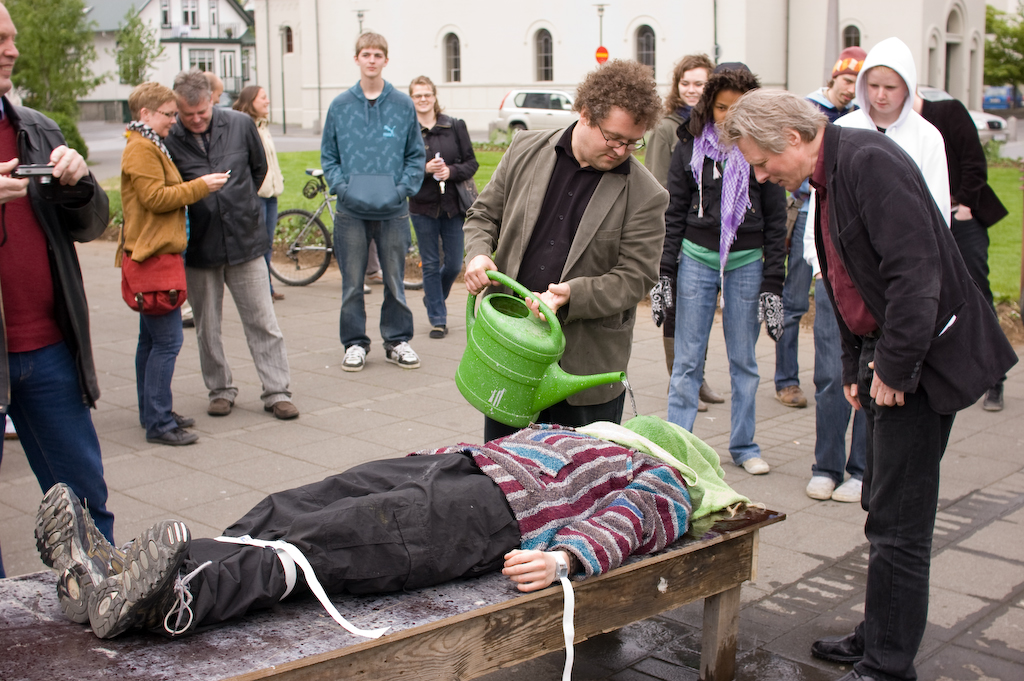
Demonstration of waterboarding at a street protest during a visit by Condoleezza Rice to Iceland, May 2008

Waterboarding is a method that gives the subject the sensation of drowning, and may cause permanent damage to the lungs and other parts of the body. Some individuals being waterboarded, who may have had preexisting cardiac or respiratory disease, have died under the method.

The CIA used waterboarding, and other interrogation techniques against three suspected Al-Qaeda members, Khalid Sheikh Mohammed, Abu Zubaydah and Abd al-Rahim al-Nashiri.

==== Finding of War Crimes culpability ====
In 2007, Red Cross investigators concluded in a secret report that the CIA's interrogation methods for high-level Al-Qaeda prisoners constituted torture which could make the Bush administration officials who approved them guilty of war crimes, according to the book Dark Side: The Inside Story of How the War on Terror Turned Into a War on American Ideals, by Jane Mayer a journalist for The New Yorker.

According to the book, the report of the International Committee of the Red Cross found that the methods used on Abu Zubaydah, the first major Al-Qaeda figure captured by the US, were "categorically" torture, which is illegal under both US law and international conventions to which the US is a party. A copy of the report was given to the CIA in 2007. For example, the book states that Abu Zubaydah was confined in a box "so small he said he had to double up his limbs in the fetal position" and was one of several prisoners to be "slammed against the walls," according to the Red Cross report. The CIA has admitted that Abu Zubaydah and two other prisoners were waterboarded, a practice in which water is poured on the nose and mouth to create the sensation of suffocation and drowning, and an internationally recognized technique of torture.

==== Training in torture ====
On January 24, 1997, two CIA manuals were declassified in response to a Freedom of Information Act (FOIA) request filed by the Baltimore Sun in 1994. The first manual, "KUBARK Counterintelligence Interrogation", dated July 1963, is the source of much of the material in the second manual. The second manual, "Human Resource Exploitation Training Manual - 1983", was used in at least seven US training courses conducted in Latin American countries, including Honduras, between 1982 and 1987. Both manuals deal exclusively with interrogation and have an entire chapter devoted to "coercive techniques." These manuals recommend arresting suspects early in the morning by surprise, blindfolding them, and stripping them naked. Interrogation rooms should be windowless, soundproof, dark and without toilets. Suspects should be held incommunicado and should be deprived of any kind of normal routine in eating and sleeping. The manuals describe coercive techniques to be used "to induce psychological regression in the subject by bringing a superior outside force to bear on his will to resist."

While the US manuals contained coercive measures, they did not rise to the level of what is generally defined as torture. Torture was, however, still practiced by multiple US-supported authoritarian South American governments, especially during 1973 to 1983, a period known in Argentina as the Dirty War.

In 2007, the chief Argentinian interrogator, Ernesto Guillermo Barreiro, was arrested in the US. It is not clear whether he will be deported, held, or extradited. The other two arrested were Peruvians, Telmo Ricardo Hurtado and Juan Manuel Rivera Rondon, accused of having participated in the massacre of 69 peasants in an Andean village in 1985, when President Alan García was trying to suppress the Maoist Shining Path guerrilla movement. Garcia was the president of Peru again from 2006 to 2011.

CIA involvement ranged from no knowledge, to knowledge but no participation, to knowledge with the suggestion that less brutal techniques were appropriate, to participation or observation.

=== Rendition and disappearance ===
Extraordinary rendition is the process of clandestinely moving a prisoner from where he was captured, to an interrogation center in a country not subject to US law regarding extreme methods of interrogation. Some reports indicate CIA personnel operated the prison and performed the interrogations, while others state that while the CIA delivered the prisoner, third-country intelligence personnel did the actual interrogation. The Wikipedia Category:Black sites details the list of known or suspected black sites where CIA prisoners may be detained. Known or suspected aircraft used to transport prisoners are in Rendition aircraft.

A claim that the black sites existed was made by The Washington Post in November 2005 and before by human rights NGOs. US president George W. Bush acknowledged the existence of secret prisons operated by the CIA during a speech on September 6, 2006.

==== 2007 status of ghost detainees ====
A 50-page HRW report, "Ghost Prisoner: Two Years in Secret CIA Detention", contains a detailed description of a secret CIA prison from a Palestinian former detainee who was released from custody the previous year. HRW has also sent a public letter to US president George W. Bush requesting information about the fate and whereabouts of the missing detainees.

"President Bush told us that the last 14 CIA prisoners were sent to Guantanamo, but there are many other prisoners 'disappeared' by the CIA whose fate is still unknown," said Joanne Mariner, terrorism and counterterrorism director at HRW. "The question is: what happened to these people and where are they now?"

In early September 2006, 14 detainees were transferred from secret CIA prisons to military custody at Guantánamo Bay. In a televised speech on September 6, 2006, President Bush announced that with those 14 transfers, no prisoners were left in CIA custody. A further congressional investigation and a series of hearings were conducted within Congress. Then-candidate Obama also promised to close down Guantanamo Bay but did not follow through. 41 prisoners are still held at Guantanamo without US judicial processes followed for their detainments.

== Police training ==
Before 1973, Administrations were principally concerned with a Communist threat of subversion, to be met with host country internal security forces such as the police. Police and military roles were blurred. US assistance to foreign police began in the 1950s, and increased in the early 1960s when the Kennedy administration became concerned about growing communist insurgent activities and established a public safety program within the Agency for International Development (AID) to train foreign police. By 1968 the US was spending $60 million a year to train police in 34 countries in areas such as criminal investigation, patrolling, interrogation and counterinsurgency techniques, riot control, weapon use, and bomb disposal The US also provided weapons, telecommunications, transportation, and other equipment. In the early 1970s, the Congress became concerned over the apparent absence of clear policy guidelines and the use of program funds to support repressive regimes that committed human rights' abuses. As a result, "the Congress determined that it was inadvisable for the United States to continue supporting any foreign police organizations". Both the CIA and military intelligence with Counterintelligence Force Protection Source Operations may have intelligence-collecting relationships with local police.

The Bureau of Diplomatic Security, under the Department of State (DOS) representatives at any embassy is expected to be aware of all contacts between US personnel and local law enforcement organizations. The 1973 legislation significantly limited police training of all sorts, partially in response to human rights concerns.

The majority of this training went to Latin America, but some did go to countries elsewhere in the world, according to Senator Alan Cranston, especially those with narcotics or terrorism problems. Cranston cited six reasons why the Congress, in 1974, banned police training, after learning of training and equipping "police in Iran, Vietnam, Brazil, and other countries were involved in torture, murder, and the suppression of legitimate political activity":

First, training was provided to so-called friendly anti-Communist regimes, without regard to whether they were dictatorships or not.

Second, law enforcement efforts were subordinated to U.S. counterinsurgency goals. As the Government Accountability Office (GAO) noted, U.S. training included such topics as counterinsurgency techniques, weapons use, and Communist ideology. This also meant, in practice, reinforcing the control of recipient countries' militaries over the police.

Third, and this is clearly borne out in the Langguth book, U.S. trainers were not always the best America had to offer.

Fourth, U.S. intelligence agencies were given an important role in the development and execution of these programs.

Fifth, police training was not placed in the broader context of administration of justice, with its emphasis on judicial and prison reform.

And, finally, human rights was rarely a factor in policy considerations at the time.

Cranston went on to say,

This ban remained virtually ironclad until 1985, when Congress authorized the President to support 'programs to enhance investigative capabilities conducted under judicial or prosecutorial control' in functioning democracies in the Western hemisphere. As a result, the Department of Justice—together with the State Department and the Agency for International Development—established the International Criminal Investigative Training Assistance Program ICITAP. Operational responsibility was left entirely to ICITAP under the supervision of officials in the Deputy Attorney General's office, with policy guidance provided by the Department of State.

In principle, training and assistance to police, as opposed to military organization, is against US law, but the relevant law allows presidential waiver of most provisions. A GAO report

... provides information on (1) the legislative authority for providing assistance to foreign law enforcement agencies and personnel, (2) the extent and cost of U.S. activities, and (3) experts' opinions on the management of these programs.

=== General Accounting Office investigation ===
In 1973 and 1974, the Congress enacted legislation forbidding US agencies from using foreign economic or military assistance funds to assist foreign police, but it subsequently granted numerous exemptions to permit assistance in some countries and in various aspects of police force development, including material and weapons support, force management, narcotics control, and counterterrorism tactics. The 1974 prohibition did not apply to the use of other funds by agencies such as the United States Department of Justice (DOJ) or United States Department of Transportation (DOT) to train or assist foreign law enforcement personnel.

No government agency is in charge of calculating the cost. However, GAO identified 125 countries that received US training and assistance for their police forces during fiscal year 1990 at a cost of at least $117 million.

The prohibition did not apply to DEA and FBI assistance to combat international narcotics trafficking.

During fiscal year 1990 at a cost of about $117 million, the GAO estimated the major programs were US programs providing:

- US DOS International Narcotics Control ($45 million) Antiterrorism Assistance ($10 million)
- DOJ ICITAP ($20 million)
  - US Department of Defense's (DOD) national police forces assistance ($42 million).

Current and former DOS and other government officials, and academic experts who have been involved in assistance to foreign police forces, stated that the US government lacks: a clear policy, or program objectives, on the role of US assistance to police forces in the new and emerging democracies, a focal point for coordination and decision-making, and a means for determining whether individual programs and activities support US policy or contribute to overall US interests.

They noted that each program is managed individually, and the only place that coordination is occurring is at the US embassy in the country.

==== Scope and methodology on investigation on CIA training assistance ====
GAO obtained information on CIA training and assistance provided to foreign law enforcement personnel, reviewed the legislative authority for providing this training and assistance, and identified efforts to coordinate these activities. They did not review program implementation in recipient countries. They interviewed officials and obtained records from AID and the DOS, DOJ, and DOD, in Washington, D.C.; reviewed legislation and agency legal opinions on foreign police assistance; interviewed academic and legal experts on current US assistance to foreign police; and reviewed literature published on foreign police assistance and AID's public safety program.

=== Legislative exemptions to the prohibition on US assistance to foreign police ===
Congressionally approved exemptions generally authorize activities that benefit a specific US goal, such as countering the terrorist threat to US citizens overseas or combating drug trafficking. Exemptions were also extended by:

- The International Security and Development Cooperation Act of 1981 – for Haiti
- International Security and Development Assistance Authorizations Act of 1983 – antiterrorism program to allow training in relation to aviation security, crisis management, document screening techniques, facility security, maritime security, protection for VIPs, and handling of detector dogs.
- International Security and Development Cooperation Act of 1985 – El Salvador & Honduras

It also expanded the judicial reform program and the police training exemption to Latin America and the Caribbean countries. In 1988 the Congress further expanded the judicial reform program to allow police assistance to promote investigative and forensic skills, develop law enforcement training curricula, and improve administration and management of law enforcement organizations. This act specifically prohibited DOD and the US armed forces from providing training under this program.

Maritime subjects were exempted from the section 660 prohibition and the prohibition for any country that has a long-standing democratic tradition, does not have armed forces, and does not engage in a consistent pattern of gross violations of human rights. The act permitted such countries to receive any type of police assistance.

- International Narcotics Control Acts

This series of acts approved certain police assistance activities in Latin America and the Caribbean for narcotics control purposes. The 1988 act expanded DOD's role and allowed it to provide training and weapons and ammunition in fiscal years 1989 and 1990 to foreign police units that are specifically organized for narcotics enforcement in eligible countries in Latin America and the Caribbean. This act also allowed economic support funds to be provided to Colombian police for the protection of judges, government officials, and members of the press against narco-terrorist attacks. The 1989 Act extended DOD's authority to train police units in Bolivia, Colombia, and Peru in fiscal year 1990, if the units are only for narcotics enforcement. It also allowed DOD to provide, in addition to weapons and ammunition, other defense articles such as helicopters, vehicles, radios, and personnel gear. The 1990 act authorized DOD to continue to train and equip police forces in the Andean region.

- Urgent Assistance for Democracy in Panama Act of 1990 – after the US invasion of Panama, the Congress significantly enhanced the US role in the development of the new police force in Panama.
- The Foreign Operations, Export Financing, and Related Programs Appropriations Act for 1991 – Eastern Caribbean exemption

==== Other exceptions to police assistance prohibition ====
In addition to the exemptions previously discussed, there are other authorities that waive the prohibition on assistance to police forces of foreign countries. For example, the president may authorize foreign assistance when 'it is important to the United States' security interests. This allows the president to waive any provision of the Foreign Assistance Act of 1961, including section 660.

=== US assistance provided to foreign police ===
==== Antiterrorism assistance ====
This aims to improve foreign governments' antiterrorist capabilities to better protect US citizens and interests. In 1990, the US provided assistance to 49 countries at a cost of nearly $10 million. Sixty-two percent of the funds were spent in Latin America, the Caribbean, and Europe, and less than $500,000 was used to purchase equipment. The DOS manages the program and contracts with other US government agencies, state or local police departments, and private firms to conduct the training. The Federal Aviation Administration, US Customs Service, the Immigration and Naturalization Service, the Federal Law Enforcement Training Center, and the US Marshals Service are regular trainers. In compliance with legislative requirements, most training takes place in the US.

==== International narcotics control ====
One of the objectives of DOS Bureau of International Narcotics Matters (INM) international narcotics control training program is to strengthen host country enforcement and interdiction capabilities. During fiscal year 1990, INM provided a minimum of $45 million in training and equipment to foreign police, principally in Mexico, Jamaica, Colombia, Ecuador, Peru, Bolivia, Brazil, Venezuela, Pakistan, Thailand, and Turkey. These are all narcotics producing and trafficking countries.

INM reimburses other US government agencies, primarily the Drug Enforcement Administration (DEA), Customs, and Coast Guard, to conduct the actual training. DEA provides narcotics investigative training, Customs teaches air, sea and land port search procedures, and Coast Guard teaches courses in maritime interdiction. Other agencies may also be requested to train on a reimbursable basis in areas where they have specific expertise. For example, DOD provides helicopter training to police in drug trafficking countries. Training is conducted both overseas and in the US and is reviewed and approved by INM.

In addition, DOD used military assistance funds to train and equip narcotics enforcement police in several drug producing and trafficking countries. Documents provided by DOD show that in fiscal year 1990, DOD provided training and equipment with a value of at least $17 million to Mexico, $1.3 million to Bolivia, $10 million to Colombia, $1 million to Ecuador, and $1 million to Peru. Training and equipment valued at more than these amounts may also have been provided. However, documentation was not available at the Washington, D.C., agency headquarters level that specified the amounts for law enforcement activities. The equipment provided consisted of UH-1 helicopters and spare parts, ammunition, small arms, riot control equipment, radios, and miscellaneous personal gear.

==== Investigative and international police training ====
In FY1986, AID transferred funds to DOJ to design, develop, and implement projects to improve and enhance the investigative capabilities of law enforcement agencies in the Latin American and Caribbean region. This was part of AID's effort to reform judicial systems. Using these funds, DOJ established ICITAP. Operating under DOS oversight, ICITAP has conducted criminal justice sector needs assessments in the region and has expanded its training to include basic police management and police academy development. In fiscal year 1990, ICITAP received $7 million from DOS for its regional program. It trained more than 1,000 students from the Caribbean, Central and South America and sponsored 7 conferences. Training includes police management, criminal investigation, crime scene search, and forensic medicine courses. Except for students sent to training programs in the US, ICITAP training takes place overseas.

The FBI also provides limited training for foreign law enforcement officials. Each year approximately 100 international police officials attend the 11-week college level course at the FBI National Academy that includes studies on management and forensic sciences. The FBI pays for the training and subsistence, but does not pay for the students' transportation. Over the last 10 years, more than 1,100 foreign police officials from 89 countries have graduated from this course.

Using its own funds, the FBI created two training courses:

- Training for Mexican police to better assist the US in its investigations. Mexican officers receive a 3-day course in basic law enforcement techniques to include crime scene management, collection and preservation of evidence, hostage negotiations, forensic science, and investigative techniques. Since 1987, over 400 Mexican border police have been trained. FBI officials stated that the FBI plans to establish a training school in Mexico during 1992 at an estimated cost of about $250,000 annually, excluding salaries.
- The second course developed by the FBI for foreign police was to provide mid-level management training for police officials from the Pacific Island nations. The 4-week course includes first-line supervision, investigative techniques, and hostage negotiations. During 1991, 52 students graduated from the course held in Guam at a cost to the FBI of about $35,000. About 50 students are expected to attend this course during the spring of 1992.

The FBI also provides other training and assistance to foreign police as requested, but the cost is unknown. For example, the National Center for the Analysis of Violent Crime provided training to Canadian police. The Criminal Investigative Division conducted a training seminar for officers from Italy's three national law enforcement agencies on the use of sensitive investigative techniques such as the operation of confidential sources, undercover operations, and electronic surveillance. The FBI also furnishes on-the-job assistance to governments who request help during particularly difficult or sensitive investigations.

==== Counterterrorism and military assistance ====
DOD supplies a limited amount of military training and assistance to police officials. During fiscal years 1986 and 1987, DOD trained and equipped the El Salvadoran and Honduran police to counter urban terrorist activities.

This assistance was authorized in response to the murder of US Marines by terrorists in El Salvador and was managed and delivered by the US Army Military Police. The assistance consisted of training in counterterrorism techniques and the supply of police vehicles, communications, weapons, and other equipment. This effort cost $19.8 million, of which $17 million was provided to El Salvador.

In fiscal year 1990, DOD spent $6.4 million in previously authorized but unused military assistance funds to purchase needed equipment and weapons for Panama's newly formed national police force. Items procured included police vehicles, communications equipment, small arms, and personal gear. This assistance was a one-time, emergency program.

DOD has an ongoing military assistance program to support Costa Rican police. In fiscal year 1990, DOD supplied $431,000 in military equipment and $232,000 in military training to the Costa Rican Civil Guard to help them carry out their responsibility to protect the country's border regions. DOD provided equipment such as vehicles, personnel gear, and radios, and military training in areas such as coastal operations. Additionally, DOD conducted technical training courses in equipment maintenance and medical skills among others.

DOD, along with the United Kingdom, supports the Eastern Caribbean Regional Security System that was formed after the US intervention in Grenada. The Security System is composed of a few permanently assigned military officers, but largely depends upon island nation police officers who can be called up for military duty in case of emergency. The US equips and trains these personnel to prepare them for such an eventuality. In fiscal year 1990, DOD provided $4.2 million in military assistance funds that were used to purchase equipment such as jeeps, small arms, uniforms, and communications gear. DOD also provided $300,000 for training in special operations, rural patrol, field survival, surveillance, and technical courses in communications, navigation, maintenance, and medicine.

==== Difficulties in determining cost and extent of assistance ====
Since some agencies fund assistance out of their own budgets, without necessarily having a line item for police assistance, the GAO "could not accurately determine the extent or cost of assistance to foreign police" In the GAO estimates, "some double counting of students may be occurring and agencies may not be differentiating between assistance provided to police and assistance provided to the military." This might happen when "the agency supplying the training and the agency paying for the training may both include the trainees in their reporting systems, such as when ICITAP pays for students attending the FBI academy."

While the DOJ was asked to calculate information on its work with foreign police, it could not assign a dollar value to items including "travel expenses, salaries, and expendable items such as course materials." "Also, GAO could not always determine whether a student was a police officer or a military member because some agencies do not collect such data, DOD officials informed us that once they receive permission to train police in a specific activity they do not provide a further accounting breakdown. For example, training provided to the Eastern Caribbean Regional Security System was for law enforcement personnel, although a few trainees may have belonged to military organizations."

== Human experimentation ==
Project MKULTRA, or MK-ULTRA, was the code name for a CIA mind-control research program that began in 1950, involved primarily with the experimentation of drugs and other "chemical, biological and radiological" stimuli on both willing and uninformed subjects.

Brainwashing as a descriptive term entered the lexicon of the CIA in January 1950. Although widely used in science fiction novels, dystopian depictions of oppressive governments, and other popular culture mediums, brainwashing as it relates to the CIA was disseminated by the CIA to "fuel public anxiety about communist methods". MK-Ultra, as verified with unsealed public documents, was a CIA program intended to brainwash. Independent researchers have verified that the historical explanation for brainwashing in MK-Ultra could have only been accomplished through torture. Thus, torture on civilians and unwilling participants, itself a humans rights violation, comes to frame.

=== Rockefeller Commission ===
In December 1974, The New York Times reported that the CIA had conducted illegal domestic activities, including experiments on US citizens, during the 1960s. The report prompted investigations by both the US Congress (in the form of the Church Committee) and a presidential commission (known as the Rockefeller Commission). The congressional investigations and the Rockefeller Commission report revealed that the CIA and the DOD had in fact conducted experiments to influence and control human behavior through the use of psychoactive drugs such as LSD and mescaline and other chemical, biological, and psychological means. Experiments were often conducted without the subjects' knowledge or consent.

MK-ULTRA was started on the order of CIA director Allen Dulles, largely in response to alleged Soviet, Chinese, and North Korean use of mind-control techniques on US prisoners of war in Korea. The goal of the experiments was to study mind-control in order to develop methods of interrogation and behavior modification and manipulation, as well as to develop a possible truth drug.

=== Outcome ===
MK-ULTRA research ultimately proved useless to the CIA and they have abandoned the program. Because most MK-ULTRA records were deliberately destroyed in 1973 by order of then-CIA director Richard Helms, it is difficult if not impossible to have a complete understanding of the more than 150 individually funded research sub-projects sponsored by MK-ULTRA and related CIA programs.

Following the recommendations of the Church Committee, President Gerald Ford in 1976 issued the first Executive Order on Intelligence Activities which, among other things, prohibited "experimentation with drugs on human subjects, except with the informed consent, in writing and witnessed by a disinterested party, of each such human subject" and in accordance with the guidelines issued by the National Commission. Subsequent orders by Presidents Carter and Reagan expanded the directive to apply to any human experimentation.

== Assassination and targeted killing ==
=== Targeted killing ===
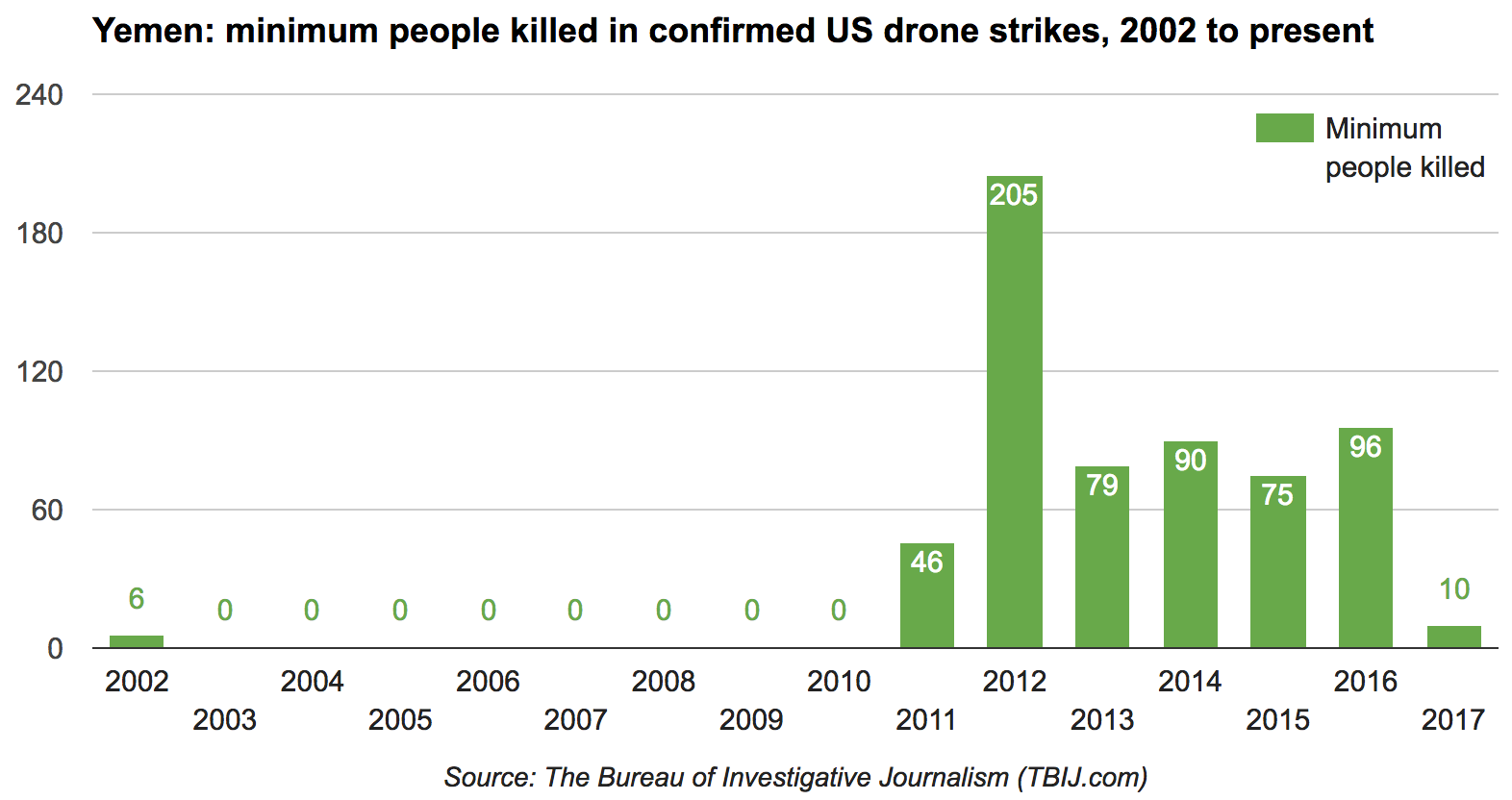
Graph of average casualties in drone strikes ordered by the United States in Yemen, 2002–2017.

At least since World War II, a distinction has been drawn between assassination of civilian leaders, and targeted killings of leaders of fighting organizations, including the British-Czech Operation Anthropoid (the killing of SS officer Reinhard Heydrich, acting Reichsprotektor of the Protectorate of Bohemia and Moravia), a failed British attempt to kill Field Marshal Erwin Rommel, and Operation Vengeance, the shooting down of Isoroku Yamamoto by the US Air Force.

The CIA has admitted to involvement in assassination attempts against foreign leaders. Recently, there have been targeted killings of alleged terrorists, typically with missiles fired from unmanned aerial vehicles (UAVs) or drones.

The Pakistani government, which may "have picked some targets of drone attacks" has criticized the US for drones flying over its territory as an infringement of Pakistani sovereignty. Increased criticism of the CIA drone program has come mostly during the later stages of the war in Afghanistan. One of the main criticisms of the drone program is that "the surgical use of military force in self-defense itself creates a state of international armed conflict". Arguments and criticisms of the CIA drone program have been made, but as it is still relatively new, legal rulings have not yet been made.

=== Assassinations ===
CIA personnel were involved in attempted assassinations of foreign government leaders such as Fidel Castro. They provided support to those that killed Patrice Lumumba. In yet another category was noninterference in the Republic of Vietnam (South Vietnam) Coup d'état in which President Ngo Dinh Diem was killed.

A distinction has been drawn between political assassinations and "targeted killing" of leaders of non-state belligerents.

==== Castro ====
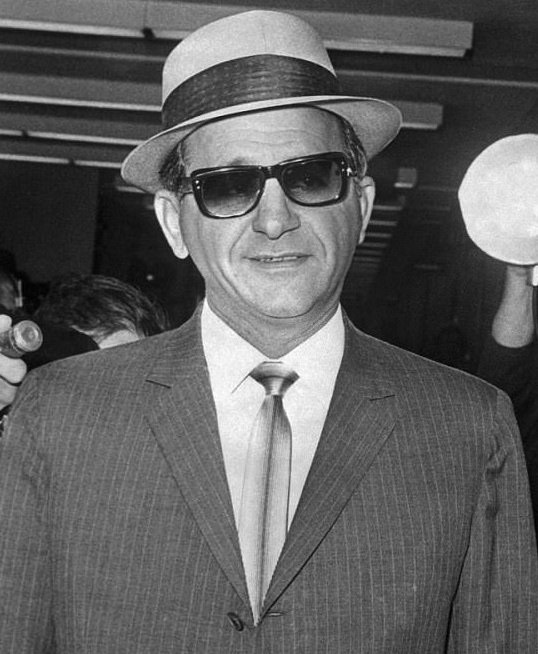
The CIA recruited Sam Giancana (pictured), Santo Trafficante and other mobsters to assassinate Fidel Castro.

Perhaps the best-documented account of CIA-sponsored assassination plans were against President Fidel Castro of Cuba.

According to columnist Jack Anderson, the first attempt was part of the Bay of Pigs Invasion operation, but five more teams were sent, the last apprehended on a rooftop within rifle range of Castro, at the end of February or beginning of March 1963.

Robert Maheu was identified as the team leader, who recruited John Roselli, a gambler with contacts in the Italian American Mafia and Cuban underworlds. The CIA assigned two operations officers, William King Harvey and James O'Connell, to accompany Roselli to Miami to recruit the actual teams.

Anderson's story appears to be confirmed by two CIA documents, the first referring to an Inspector General report of investigation of allegations that the Agency conspired to assassinate Fidel Castro. The story first appeared in Drew Pearson's column and has since appeared in Jack Anderson's column. "While the columns contained many factual errors, the allegations are basically true." Second, a declassified memo from Howard Osborne, director of the CIA Office of Security, dated February 15, 1972, in the "CIA Family Jewels" series, to the Executive Director, speaks of John Roselli, then serving time in a Federal penitentiary in Seattle, Washington, with deportation scheduled at the end of his sentence. While the CIA was aware Roselli intended to expose his participation in the plot should if they did not intervene in his behalf. The DCI at the time, John McCone, decided to take a calculated risk and accept the consequences of possible disclosure. Two articles by Jack Anderson discuss the plot, as well the Washington Post Sunday magazine, Parade

Individuals who were aware of this project were: Director of Central Intelligence Allen Dulles, Richard M. Bissell Jr. (Deputy Director for Plans (DDP)) Colonel J.C. King (Chief, Western Hemisphere Division, DDP), Colonel Sheffield Edwards, William Harvey, and James P. O'Connell. Also included were Robert A. Maheu (former FBI agent, public relations agent who did work for the CIA, and later an aide to Howard Hughes), and his attorneys Edward P. Morgan and Edward Bennett Williams.

On February 26, 1971, Osborne arranged with the Commissioner of the US Immigration and Naturalization Service to flag any deportation. INS confirmed they did this again for 1972.

Cuba's former counterintelligence chief, Fabian Escalante, reviewed more than six hundred CIA plots to assassinate Fidel Castro, a project code-named Executive Action, in his book Executive Action: 634 Ways to Kill Fidel Castro. The various plots, some of which were abandoned, included the use of cigars (poisoned or exploding), poison pills hidden in a cold-cream jar, the use of Caribbean molluscs containing explosives and a custom-made diving-suit infected with a fungus that would cause a debilitating skin disease. The assassination attempts started under the presidency of Dwight D. Eisenhower and continued under John F. Kennedy and Lyndon B. Johnson. Most attempts were made during Richard Nixon's presidency. When Castro traveled abroad, the CIA cooperated with Cuban exiles for some of the more serious assassination attempts. In 2000, when Castro was due to visit Panama, a plot was hatched to put explosives under the podium where he was due to speak. Castro's personal security team discovered the explosives before he arrived.

Furthermore, the Bay of Pigs invasion launched in April 1961 was instigated by the director of the CIA Allen Dulles, Richard Bissell Jr., the deputy director of the CIA, and General Lyman Lemnitzer. Kennedy was initially "wary and reserved" when hearing about the plan, but later succumbed. An evident fault in the invasion was the rejection of "clear evidence of Castro's political and military strength" even as other governments attempted to make the US aware. Thus, another plotted coup by the CIA towards Castro's regime failed and backfired, leading to Castro's further isolationist vision of Cuba's future.

==== Diem ====
In summary, CIA, Embassy, and other US personnel, up to White House level, were aware of yet another coup being planned against President Ngo Dinh Diem of South Vietnam. While the US had no direct participation in the coup, the plotters were told, in a deniable way, that the US did not object to it. No documentary evidence has surfaced that the US knew that Diem and his brother were to be killed, and it is unclear if all the Vietnamese plotters knew or agreed to it. President John F. Kennedy was aware of the coup plans, but apparently had not considered the hazard to Diem.

According to the Pentagon Papers, the final US loss of confidence in Diem began when his government violently suppressed a protest on Buddha's Birthday, May 8, 1963. Up to that point, the majority of Buddhists had not been very politically active, even though Diem had given preference to the Catholic minority. Quickly, however, the Buddhists put a "cohesive and disciplined [political] organization" into action. By June, the situation moved from dissidence from a religious group to a "grave crisis of public confidence".

Then-Ambassador Frederick Nolting had tried to persuade Diem to moderate government action against Buddhists, but with no success. While Nolting was on leave, President John F. Kennedy appointed Henry Cabot Lodge Jr. as the new Ambassador. In June 1963, senior leaders began, for the first time, to discuss the effect of a coup to remove Diem. Nolting and the US military in Vietnam, however, argued that Diem was keeping chaos at bay. Nolting left permanently in mid-August, but the assurances from Diem died with multiple August 21 night raids on Buddhist temples in many parts of Vietnam. Two days later, a US representative was approached by generals considering a coup. On August 23, the first contact with a US representative was made by generals who had begun to plan a coup against Diem. They were told that the US had determined that Diem's brother, who had led the raids on the Buddhists, could not stay in any kind of power, and that, "then, we must face the possibility that Diem himself cannot be preserved."

A White House tape of President Kennedy and his advisers ... confirms that top U.S. officials sought the 1 November 1963 coup against then-South Vietnamese leader Ngo Dinh Diem without apparently considering the physical consequences for Diem personally (he was murdered the following day). The taped meeting and related documents show that U.S. officials, including JFK, vastly overestimated their ability to control the South Vietnamese generals who ran the coup 40 years ago this week [November 2003]. The Kennedy tape from 29 October 1963 captures the highest-level White House meeting immediately prior to the coup, including the President's brother voicing doubts about the policy of support for a coup: "I mean, it's different from a coup in the Iraq or South American country; we are so intimately involved in this ...

A May 8, 1973 memorandum states that "An Inspector General report of investigation of allegations that the Agency was instrumental in bringing about the assassination of President Ngo Dinh Diem of South Vietnam. The allegations were determined to be without foundation."

Nevertheless, the Pentagon Papers observed,

For the military coup d'etat against Ngo Dinh Diem, the U.S. must accept its full share of responsibility. Beginning in August 1963 we variously authorized, sanctioned and encouraged the coup efforts of the Vietnamese generals and offered full support for a successor government. In October we cut off aid to Diem in a direct rebuff, giving a green light to the generals. We maintained clandestine contact with them throughout the planning and execution of the coup and sought to review their operational plans and proposed new government. Thus, as the nine-year rule of Diem came to a bloody end, our complicity in his overthrow heightened our responsibilities and our commitment in an essentially leaderless Vietnam.

==== Lumumba ====
The Church Committee concluded it had "solid evidence of a plot to assassinate Patrice Lumumba (the first elected Prime Minister of the Democratic Republic of the Congo). Strong hostility to Lumumba, voiced at the very highest levels of government may have been intended to initiate an assassination operation; at the least it engendered such an operation. The evidence indicates that it is likely that President Eisenhower's expression of strong concern about Lumumba at a meeting of the National Security Council on 18 August 1960 was taken by (Director of Central Intelligence) Allen Dulles as authority to assassinate Lumumba. There is, however, testimony by Eisenhower Administration officials, and ambiguity and lack of clarity in the records of high-level policy meetings, which tends to contradict the evidence that the President intended an assassination effort against Lumumba. In a footnote, the Committee cited an unnamed official as saying he had heard Eisenhower order the assassination."

Lumumba was killed in 1961 by forces under the control of President Moïse Tshombe of Katanga, a province that had declared its independence from the Republic of the Congo. Lumumba was taken by Katangan soldiers commanded by Belgians, and eventually shot by a Katangan firing squad under Belgian leadership. US intelligence was kept apprised.

==== Al-Mahdawi ====
According to the Church Committee report:

In February 1960, CIA's Near East Division sought the endorsement of what the Division Chief [James H. Critchfield] called the "Health Alteration Committee" for its proposal for a "special operation" to "incapacitate" an Iraqi Colonel believed to be "promoting Soviet bloc political interests in Iraq." The Division sought the Committee's advice on a technique, "which while not likely to result in total disablement would be certain to prevent the target from pursuing his usual activities for a minimum of three months," adding: "We do not consciously seek subject's permanent removal from the scene; we also do not object should this complication develop." ... In April [1962], the [Health Alteration] Committee unanimously recommended to the DDP [Deputy Director for Plans, Richard M. Bissell Jr.] that a "disabling operation" be undertaken, noting that the Chief of Operations advised that it would be "highly desirable." Bissell's deputy, Tracy Barnes, approved on behalf of Bissell. ... The approved operation was to mail a monogrammed handkerchief containing an incapacitating agent to the colonel from an Asian country. [James] Scheider [Science Advisor to Bissell] testified that, while he did not now recall the name of the recipient, he did remember mailing from the Asian country, during the period in question, a handkerchief "treated with some kind of material for the purpose of harassing that person who received it." ... During the course of this Committee's investigation, the CIA stated that the handkerchief was "in fact never received (if, indeed, sent)." It added that the colonel: "Suffered a terminal illness before a firing squad in Baghdad (an event we had nothing to do with) not very long after our handkerchief proposal was considered."

Iraq was not a central focus of the Church Committee, and the Committee did not further examine the case. Details and documentation about the operation remain scarce. "James Scheider"—an alias for Sidney Gottlieb, a CIA field agent specializing in assassinations via poisoning and head of the MKUltra program—would testify that he mailed the poisoned handkerchief "for the purpose of harassing" its recipient, but that "he did not now recall the name of the recipient." Although some sources state that Iraq's leader, Brigadier Abd al-Karim Qasim, was the intended recipient of the poisoned handkerchief, circumstantial evidence indicates that Colonel Fahdil Abbas al-Mahdawi—Qasim's cousin who headed the Iraqi Special High Military Court (colloquially known as the "People's Court")—was the more likely target. Qasim did not openly promote Soviet interests in Iraq, on the other hand, al-Mahdawi, while not a communist, sympathized with the Iraqi Communist Party (ICP) leading US officials to view al-Mahdawi's activities as "Soviet penetration into Iraqi society," and "used his prominence at any given moment as a barometer of communist influence on Qasim." Also, Qasim—unlike al-Mahdawi—was not a colonel but a brigadier general. Qasim pointedly refused to license the ICP as a legal party in January 1960, but al-Mahdawi remained a crucial conduit between Qasim's government and several communist-front groups—including the "Peace Partisans", which was allowed to operate in public despite being formally outlawed in May 1961—and was known for his outspoken praise for Fidel Castro as well as his trips throughout the Soviet Union, the Eastern Bloc, and China. In 1991, former high-ranking US diplomat Hermann Eilts told journalist Elaine Sciolino that al-Mahdawi had been the target.

Al-Mahdawi and some of his family members were stricken with a serious case of what al-Mahdawi dubbed "influenza" in 1962, but it is unknown whether this ailment was related to the CIA's plan to poison him; Nathan J. Citino observes that "the timing of the illness does not correspond exactly to that of the 'incapacitating' operation as described in the cited testimony." Qasim and al-Mahdawi were both ultimately executed by the Iraqi Ba'ath Party following a successful coup in February 1963, which the US supported but "did not initiate", according to Citino.

==== Trujillo ====
An Inspector General report of investigation of allegations that the CIA was instrumental in bringing about the assassination of Rafael Trujillo, dictator of the Dominican Republic. Trujillo was effective head of government at the time of his assassination in 1961.

In a report to the Deputy Attorney General of the United States, CIA officials described the agency as having "no active part" in the assassination and only a "faint connection" with the groups that planned the killing. However, the internal investigation by the CIA's Inspector General "disclosed quite extensive Agency involvement with the plotters."

==== Sukarno ====
According to an 86-page portion of the Rockefeller Commission investigating the CIA's domestic activities that was removed at the behest of the Ford administration and did not become public until 2016:

[Richard] Bissell [Deputy Director of Plans for the CIA] also testified that there was discussion within the Agency of the possibility of an attempt on the life of President Achmed Sukarno of Indonesia which "progressed as far as the identification of an asset who it was felt might be recruited for this purpose. The plan was never reached, was never perfected to the point where it seemed feasible." He said the Agency had "absolutely nothing" to do with the death of Sukarno. ... He stated that no assassination plans would have been undertaken without authorization outside the Agency, and that no such authorization was undertaken for plans against either Lumumba or Sukarno. ... Since no evidence was found to bring the Sukarno and Lumumba matters within the scope of the Commission's investigative authority, no further investigation in these two areas was undertaken.

==== Nicaragua ====
In 1984, a CIA manual for training the Nicaraguan Contras in psychological operations and unconventional warfare, entitled "Psychological Operations in Guerrilla Warfare", became public. The manual recommended "selective use of violence for propagandistic effects" and to "neutralize" (i.e., kill) government officials. Nicaraguan Contras were taught to lead:

... demonstrators into clashes with the authorities, to provoke riots or shootings, which lead to the killing of one or more persons, who will be seen as the martyrs; this situation should be taken advantage of immediately against the Government to create even bigger conflicts.

The manual also recommended:

... selective use of armed force for PSYOP [psychological operations] effect. ... Carefully selected, planned targets—judges, police officials, tax collectors, etc.—may be removed for PSYOP effect in a UWOA [unconventional warfare operations area], but extensive precautions must insure that the people "concur" in such an act by thorough explanatory canvassing among the affected populace before and after conduct of the mission.

The CIA claimed that the purpose of the manual was to "moderate" activities already being done by the Contras.

== See also ==
- List of CIA controversies
- United States President's Commission on CIA Activities within the United States

== Sources ==
- Gibson, Bryan R. (2015). Sold Out? US Foreign Policy, Iraq, the Kurds, and the Cold War. Palgrave Macmillan. ISBN 978-1-137-48711-7.
