= Pike Committee =

1975–76 United States House committee

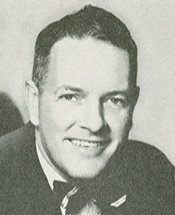
Otis G. Pike

The Pike Committee is the common name for the United States House Permanent Select Committee on Intelligence during the period when it was chaired by Democratic Representative Otis G. Pike of New York. Under Pike's chairmanship, the committee investigated illegal activities by the U.S. Central Intelligence Agency (CIA), the Federal Bureau of Investigation (FBI), and the National Security Agency (NSA). The Committee conducted much of its investigation, while the U.S. Senate Select Committee to Study Governmental Operations with Respect to Intelligence Activities, chaired by Senator Frank Church and informally known as the "Church Committee," conducted its own investigation. Unlike the report of the investigation of the Church Committee, which was eventually released to the public in the face of Executive Branch opposition to its release, the report of the investigation by the Pike Committee was suppressed from release to the American public, although portions of it were leaked and it was eventually published abroad.

The Select Committee had originally been established in February 1975 under the chairmanship of Congressman Lucien Nedzi of Michigan. Following Nedzi's resignation in June, the committee was reconstituted with Pike as chair, in July 1975, with its mandate expiring January 31, 1976.

== Investigation ==
The Pike Committee was the U.S. House counterpart of the Church Committee of the U.S. Senate. The Congressional committees were part of an effort to push back against the "imperial presidency," an Executive Branch seen as encompassing a national security state with vast, unchecked power at the helm of a superpower.

The Pike Committee interviewed some of the same witnesses as the Church Committee. Unlike the Church Committee, which concluded that much of the blame for illegal and embarrassing covert actions, such as assassinations of foreign political leaders, fell on the CIA, the Pike Committee found clear evidence that the orders for such activities emanated from the President's office. "The CIA does not go galloping off conducting operations by itself. The major things which are done are not done unilaterally by the CIA without approval from higher up the line...We did find evidence, upon evidence, upon evidence where the CIA said: 'No, don't do it,' The State Department or the White House said, 'We're going to do it.'...The CIA never did anything the White House didn't want. Sometimes they didn't want to do what they did," Chairman Pike wrote.

== The CIA and the Administration "stone wall" and "deceive" ==
The Pike Committee's demands for information were resisted and stalled by US President Gerald Ford's Administration. The eventual report produced by the Pike Committee described the Administration's sandbagging this way: “when legal proceedings were not in the offing, the access experience was frequently one of foot-dragging, stone-walling, and careful deception.”

In fact, the Administration's reluctance to release documents requested by the Committee almost ignited a constitutional crisis in 1975. Newly declassified documents from the National Security Archive demonstrate the highly contentious nature of this conflict, showing the CIA's refusal to comply with the Pike Committee's requests for information. Ultimately, when the Pike Committee was preparing to sue for the documents’ release, the CIA determined the likelihood of winning the lawsuit was remote, and Ford was able to orchestrate a compromise. The Agency would release the requested documents “on loan” to the committee, and if there were disagreements about a specific document, the President would have the final say. The Pike Committee was then able to proceed with their investigation, and generated a report.

The Pike Committee established important protocols for the declassification of intelligence documents, which would continue to evolve. It also created a precedent for the oversight of the Executive Branch and its agencies, leading to the creation of the House Permanent Select Committee on Intelligence, which now has the autonomy to declassify any of the information it receives. The Pike Committee constituted an extremely significant step in the tradition of government transparency.

== Report of the Pike Committee ==
The final report of the Pike Committee was never officially published due to White House opposition to Congressional approval of the report. However, unauthorized versions of the (draft) final report were leaked to the press. CBS News reporter Daniel Schorr was called to testify before Congress, but refused to divulge his source. Major portions of the report were published by The Village Voice, and a full copy of the draft was published in the United Kingdom by Spokesman Books of Nottingham in 1977.

== See also ==
- Church Committee
- COINTELPRO
- Family Jewels (Central Intelligence Agency)
- Human rights violations by the CIA
- United States President's Commission on CIA activities within the United States
