= Executive oversight of United States covert operations =

Groups or departments set up to monitor US undercover operations

Executive oversight of United States covert operations has been carried out by a series of sub-committees of the National Security Council (NSC).

== Birth of covert operations in the Cold War ==
At the beginning of the Cold War, it was not inevitable that covert operations would become the dominion of the Central Intelligence Agency (CIA). The National Security Act of 1947 did not explicitly authorize the CIA to conduct covert operations, although Section 102(d)(5) was sufficiently vague to permit abuse. At the very first meetings of the NSC in late 1947, the perceived necessity to "stem the flow of communism" in Western Europe—particularly Italy—by overt and covert "psychological warfare" forced the issue. The actual responsibility for these operations was a hot potato, and when it was decided that the State Department would be in charge, Secretary of State George Marshall sharply opposed it, fearing it would tarnish the international credibility of his department. The upshot was that responsibility for covert operations was passed on to the CIA; this was codified in a NSC policy paper called NSC 4-A, approved in December 1947. NSC 4-A provided the authorization for the intervention of the CIA in the Italian elections of April 1948.

=== Proposed NSC 4-A Panel ===
A draft of NSC 4-A envisioned the creation of a NSC-designated "panel" to approve operations. The executive secretary of the NSC, Sidney Souers, recommended that the panel be composed of representatives from the departments of State, Army, Navy and Air Force, as well an "observer" representative from the Joint Chiefs of Staff. This provision was dropped in the final version, which simply stated that the Director of Central Intelligence (DCI) "is charged with ensuring that [covert] psychological operations are consistent with U.S. foreign policy and overt foreign information activities, and that appropriate agencies of the U.S. Government, ..., are kept informed of such operations which will directly affect them."

== From NSC 10/2 to NSC 5412 (June 1948 – March 1955) ==
According to the Church Committee, throughout the period June 1948 to March 1955, "NSC directives provided for consultation with representatives of State and Defense". But "these representatives had no approval function. There was no formal procedure or committee to consider and approve projects."

=== NSC 10/2 Panel ===
The arrangement in NSC 4-A did not please the influential director of the State Department's Policy Planning Staff (S/P), George F. Kennan. Under his leadership, a S/P paper titled "The inauguration of organized political warfare" was circulated in the NSC in early May 1948, which said that "there are two major types of political warfare—one overt and the other covert. Both, from their basic nature, should be directed and coordinated by the Department of State." However, the paper made it clear that the State Department should not be formally associated with the conduct of covert operations. Then the Joint Chiefs of Staff entered the fray by guarding its prerogatives, particularly in wartime, especially in theatres of war. As a result of the controversy spurred by Kennan, NSC 4-A was replaced by NSC 10/2, approved by President Harry Truman on 18 June 1948, creating the Office of Policy Coordination (OPC). Kennan was still not satisfied and continued to press for State control, hoping that his choice for OPC director, Frank Wisner, would be loyal to the State Department—he was not.

NSC 10/2 was the first presidential document which specified a mechanism to approve and manage covert operations, and also the first in which the term "covert operations" was defined. NSC 10/2 charged the DCI with "Ensuring, through designated representatives of the Secretary of State and of the Secretary of Defense, that covert operations are planned and conducted in a manner consistent with US foreign and military policies and with overt activities." The representatives to this "10/2 Panel", also known as the "OPC Consultants", were Kennan for State (1948–1950) and Joseph McNarney for Defense (1948–1949). The panel, which met about once a week, was supplanted from January 1950 on by the regular attendance of a representative from the Joint Chiefs of Staff. According to Anne Karalekas, a Church Committee staffer, it did not constrain the OPC:

[The 10/2 Panel was] not an approval body, and there was no formal mechanism whereby individual projects had to be brought before [it] for discussion. Because it was assumed that covert action would be exceptional, strict provisions for specific project authorization were not considered necessary. With minimal supervision from State and Defense and with a shared agreement on the nature of the OPC mission, individuals in OPC could take the initiative in conceiving and implementing projects.

In the first half of its existence, OPC was not really under CIA's control. In the words of Edward P. Lilly, DCI Roscoe H. Hillenkoetter, "although authorized by NSC-10/2 to supervise OPC, had allowed OPC to go its own way." OPC was brought under CIA control in October 1950, when Walter Bedell Smith became DCI. OPC was merged on 1 August 1952 with the CIA branch responsible for espionage, the Office of Special Operations (OSO), to form the Directorate of Plans (DDP).

=== NSC 10/5 Panel ===
Truman swelled the bureaucracy on 4 April 1951 when he established the Psychological Strategy Board (PSB). DCI Smith, seeking more high-level policy guidance, wanted the PSB "to replace the 10/2 Panel as approval body"; this proposal was adopted by the NSC. NSC 10/5 tried to specify the purpose of the PSB. The 10/2 Panel, which continued to function, was replaced in February 1952 by an enlarged 10/5 Panel, which also included PSB staff. According to an internal CIA review from 1967, the 10/5 Panel "functioned much as the 10/2 Panel had, but the resulting procedures proved cumbersome and potentially insecure."

According to John Prados, the CIA cut the PSB out of the loop, establishing instead an internal mechanism for approval of operations. In 1953, DCI Smith said that the PSB was "incompetent and its work irrelevant".

"As the Truman administration ended", writes the Office of the Historian,

CIA was near the peak of its independence and authority in the field of covert action. Although CIA continued to seek and receive advice on specific projects from the NSC, the PSB, and the departmental representatives originally delegated to advise OPC, no group or officer outside of the DCI and the President himself had authority to order, approve, manage, or curtail operations.

=== Enter Eisenhower ===
The Eisenhower administration took office on 20 January 1953. When Eisenhower replaced the PSB with the Operations Coordinating Board (OCB) on 2 September 1953, he also did away with the 10/5 Panel, reverting to "a smaller group identical to the former 10/2 Panel, without OCB staff participation." On 15 March 1954, Eisenhower approved NSC 5412, which required CIA to consult with OCB. Although Eisenhower would later congratulate the CIA with its success in deposing Guatemala's democratically elected president, Jacobo Árbenz, he was privately irked by CIA's unauthorized bombing of SS Springfjord. According to Prados, that incident "convinced Eisenhower of the need for more rigorous control over covert action".

== Planning Coordination Group (March 1955 – December 1955) ==
The arrangement in NSC 5412 suffered the same problem as the 10/5 Panel; OCB "included more officials than ought to be concerned with secret war." So on 12 March 1955, Eisenhower approved NSC 5412/1, creating a more senior Planning Coordination Group (PCG) within OCB. Significantly, the directive explicitly charged PCG with approving covert operations. The PCG proved to be a failure; its chairman, Nelson Rockefeller, recommended the abolishment of PCG before year's end. According to Prados, the problem was that CIA had not been forthcoming with details, latching on to a mention of "need-to-know" in NSC 5412/1. The next directive would solve this by creating a committee "so high-powered there could be no question" of its need to know.

== Special Group/303 Committee (December 1955 – February 1970) ==
NSC 5412/2 was approved by Eisenhower on 28 December 1955, a directive which remained in force for 15 years. Paragraph 7 specified the new oversight mechanism:

Except as the President otherwise directs, designated representatives of the Secretary of State and of the Secretary of Defense of the rank of Assistant Secretary or above, and a representative of the President designated for this purpose, shall hereafter be advised in advance of major covert programs initiated by CIA under this policy or as otherwise directed, and shall be the normal channel for giving policy approval for such programs as well as for securing coordination of support therefor among the Departments of State and Defense and the CIA.

The resulting body became known as the 5412 Committee or, from 1957, the Special Group. (Note: It had many similar designations. For example: Special Group 5412, 5412 Group and Special NSC 5412/2 Group.) It was the first time a "designated representative" of the President was included in the process; Eisenhower used his National Security Advisors for this purpose. The DCI was an ex officio member. In 1957, Eisenhower made the Chairman of the Joint Chiefs of Staff a member as well. In practice the membership of the Special Group varied on an ad hoc basis.

In late 1956, the newly formed PBCFIA, which had turned a candid eye towards covert operations, took issue with the "very informal" procedures of the Special Group. Consequently, an annex to NSC 5412/2 was approved by Eisenhower on 26 March 1957, clarifying project approvals, and for the first time requiring the CIA to circulate "proposal papers" in advance of approval. The board continued to press for more prominence to the Special Group to keep the CIA from freewheeling. Eisenhower himself saw the proper functioning of the Special Group as crucial to fend off initiatives for meaningful congressional oversight of covert operations. On 26 December 1958 Eisenhower asked the Special Group to institute weekly meetings, with the result that "criteria for submission of projects to the Group were, in practice, considerably broadened."

=== Kennedy administration ===
The Special Group fell by the wayside when new administration of John F. Kennedy took office on 20 January 1961; although it remained "in theory intact", in practice it "took a backseat to meetings at which JFK personally presided". (Note: Some sources actually claim the Special Group was disbanded at this time.) After the failed Bay of Pigs Invasion, the Special Group returned to prominence, and new procedures were set out in July 1961. In the wake of the scandal, DDP Richard M. Bissell Jr. suggested the name and workings of the Special Group be made public to demonstrate to the American people that the CIA was under effective executive oversight; that did not happen.

A second Special Group (Augmented) existed from November 1961 to the Cuban Missile Crisis of October 1962. The only difference was that it was specifically dedicated to managing the Cuban Project which sought to overthrow Fidel Castro's regime, and was headed by Attorney General Robert F. Kennedy. After the Missile Crisis brought the world to the brink of destruction, management of the war against Castro was transferred to discussions in the EXCOMM and NSC proper, before being handed over to an "obscure NSC appendage" known as the Standing Group chaired by National Security Advisor McGeorge Bundy.

=== Johnson administration ===
The Special Group was renamed to the 303 Committee on 2 June 1964, in response to the publication of the book The Invisible Government by David Wise and Thomas B. Ross, which made the old name public. A NSC staffer had recommended the new name be "something utterly drab and innocuous" to deflect away attention. The number refers to the national security directive which effected the change, NSAM 303. Alternatively, the Encyclopedia of the Central Intelligence Agency by W. Thomas Smith Jr. claims the name derives from “a room number in the executive office complex in Washington D.C.”

In 1988, the LBJ Presidential Library declassified and released a document from the Liberty archive with the “Top Secret—Eyes Only” security caveat (Document #12C sanitized and released 21DEC88 under review case 86–199). This “Memorandum for the Record” dated April 10, 1967 reported a briefing of the “303 Committee” by General Ralph D. Steakley. According to the memo, General Steakley “briefed the committee on a sensitive DOD project known as FRONTLET 615,” which is identified in a handwritten note on the original memorandum as “submarine within U.A.R. waters.” Further Freedom of Information Act requests returned no information on any project called “FRONTLET 615.” It is alleged by some survivors of the 1967 Israeli attack on the USS Liberty and their supporters that “FRONTLET 615” was the codename for either a false flag operation or U.S. naval surveillance of Egypt. The submarines are believed to have been either the USS Amberjack or the USS Andrew Jackson, both of which were either assigned or deployed to the Mediterranean Sea during the time of the attack.

== 40 Committee ==
On 17 February 1970, President Richard Nixon approved NSDM 40, superseding and revoking NSC 5412/2, and replacing the 303 Committee with the 40 Committee. Among the few substantive changes introduced by Nixon was the inclusion of Attorney General John N. Mitchell and a requirement to review covert programs annually. Like earlier, public exposure was the motive for changing the name; National Security Adviser Henry Kissinger explained to Nixon that "In view of recent mention of the 303 Committee in the public media, the directive changes the committee name to coincide with the number assigned to the NSDM itself, which is 40."

Nixon and Kissinger, who was charged with overseeing all covert operations on Nixon's behalf, kept the 40 Committee out of the loop on almost all the major and sensitive decisions, and the 40 Committee stopped having meetings; in 1972 it only met once.

== Operations Advisory Group ==
On February 18, 1976, 40 committee was replaced by the Operations Advisory Group, in accordance with Executive Order 11905 issued by Gerald Ford. The new group was composed of the President's Assistant for National Security Affairs, the Secretaries of State and Defense, the Chairman of the Joint Chiefs of Staff, and the Director of Central Intelligence.

== NSC Special Coordination Committee ==
The following year, on May 13, 1977, President Jimmy Carter issued Executive Order 11985 which updated the previous order, and renamed the Operations Advisory Group to the NSC Special Coordination Committee (SCC).

== National Security Planning Group ==
Under the Reagan administration, the Special Coordination Committee was replaced by the National Security Planning Group (NSPG) which included the Vice-President, the Secretary of Defense, the Secretary of State, the Assistant for National Security Affairs, and the Director of the CIA. One level below the NSPG was the Policy Coordination Group (PCG), first known as the Crisis Pre-Planning Group (CPPG); one source describes the PCG as the actual successor to the Special Coordination Committee.

== Special Intelligence Office ==
In 2002–2003, during the Bush Administration, Under Secretary of Defense for Policy Douglas Feith created a special-purpose group encompassing and focusing on all military and intelligence efforts involving Iraq, Afghanistan, and other Near East countries, as well as all activities falling under the rubric of the Global War on Terror. This group has been said to have been responsible for stovepiping selective raw intelligence data, bypassing analysis processes as well as bypassing customary cooperation and coordination with NSA, Mossad, and other intelligence entities in order to shape decisions as to the war with Iraq. Its functions were morphed in the Office of Special Plans, which was subsequently investigated for manipulations of intelligence, unlawful activities, and espionage.

== Sources ==
- Prados, John (2006). Safe for Democracy: The Secret Wars of the CIA. Ivan R. Dee. ISBN 9781615780112.
- Karalekas, Anne (23 April 1976). History of the Central Intelligence Agency.
- Corke, Sarah-Jane (1 May 2006). "George Kennan and the Inauguration of Political Warfare". Journal of Conflict Studies. 26 (1): 101–120. ISSN 1715-5673.
- Gustafson, Kristian (13 September 2012). "Early stages in the evolution of covert action governance in the United States, 1951–1961". Public Policy and Administration. 28 (2): 144–160. doi:10.1177/0952076712456233. ISSN 0952-0767.
- Lilly, Edward P. (19 December 1951). "The Development of American Psychological Operations, 1945–1951". Psychological Strategy Board.
- Jackson, Wayne G. (1973). "Allen Welsh Dulles as Director of Central Intelligence, 26 February 1953–29 November 1961, Volume III – Covert Activities". Historical Staff, Central Intelligence Agency.
