= Karl G. Harr Jr. =

Karl Gottlieb Harr Jr. (born August 3, 1922–March 5, 2002) was an American defense policy expert.

Harr was born in South Orange, New Jersey. He attended Princeton University, graduating with a Bachelor of Arts degree magna cum laude in 1943. Princeton awarded Harr the Moses Taylor Pyne Honor Prize, Princeton's highest undergraduate honor. In 1948 he graduated from Yale Law School as was admitted to the New York bar in 1951.

Harr held two positions from 1956 to 1961, which enabled him to observe and participate in the inner workings of the National Security Council (NSC). In November 1956, he became Deputy Assistant Secretary of Defense for International Security Affairs and alternate Defense member of the NSC Planning Board. This position enabled him to become familiar with the functions, organization, and procedures of the National Security Council and the Operations Coordinating Board. In 1958 President Dwight D. Eisenhower appointed him as Special Assistant to the President for Security Operations Coordination and vice chairman of the Operations Coordinating Board. In this position, his functions were to seek to ensure coordinated implementation of national security policies in the programs and operations of various government departments and agencies, and to report to the President and the NSC on the effectiveness of operations coordination and implementation of national security policies.

In April 1963 he was appointed President and CEO "of the Aerospace Industries Association of America" which he held till 1987.

Throughout his professional life, Harr corresponded with a number of prominent individuals. Some of his correspondents include Nelson Rockefeller, Charles Douglas Jackson, David Sarnoff, Walter Bedell Smith, William Kintner, Hubert Humphrey, Townsend Hoopes, Robert Cutler, Robert Bowie, T. Keith Glennan, Clarence B. Randall, Lewis Strauss, Gordon Gray, and Walt Whitman Rostow. His correspondence discussed such subjects as proposals for political warfare with the Communists, U.S. foreign policy, response to Sputnik, psychological warfare, the work of the United States Information Agency, Laos, OCB committee work, developments in Germany, the Sprague Report, and the 1960 U-2 incident.

== See also ==
- U.S. President's Committee on Information Activities Abroad
