= Impersonator =

Art form or criminal act

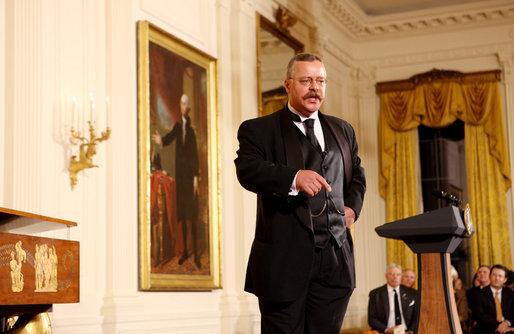
Theodore Roosevelt impersonator Joe Wiegand performs 27 October 2008 in the East Room of the White House, during a celebration of Roosevelt's 150th birthday.

An impersonator is someone who imitates or copies the behavior or actions of another. There are many reasons for impersonating someone:

- Living history: After close study of some historical figure, a performer may dress and speak "as" that person for an audience. Such historical interpretation may be a scripted dramatic performance like Mark Twain Tonight! or an unscripted interaction while staying in character.

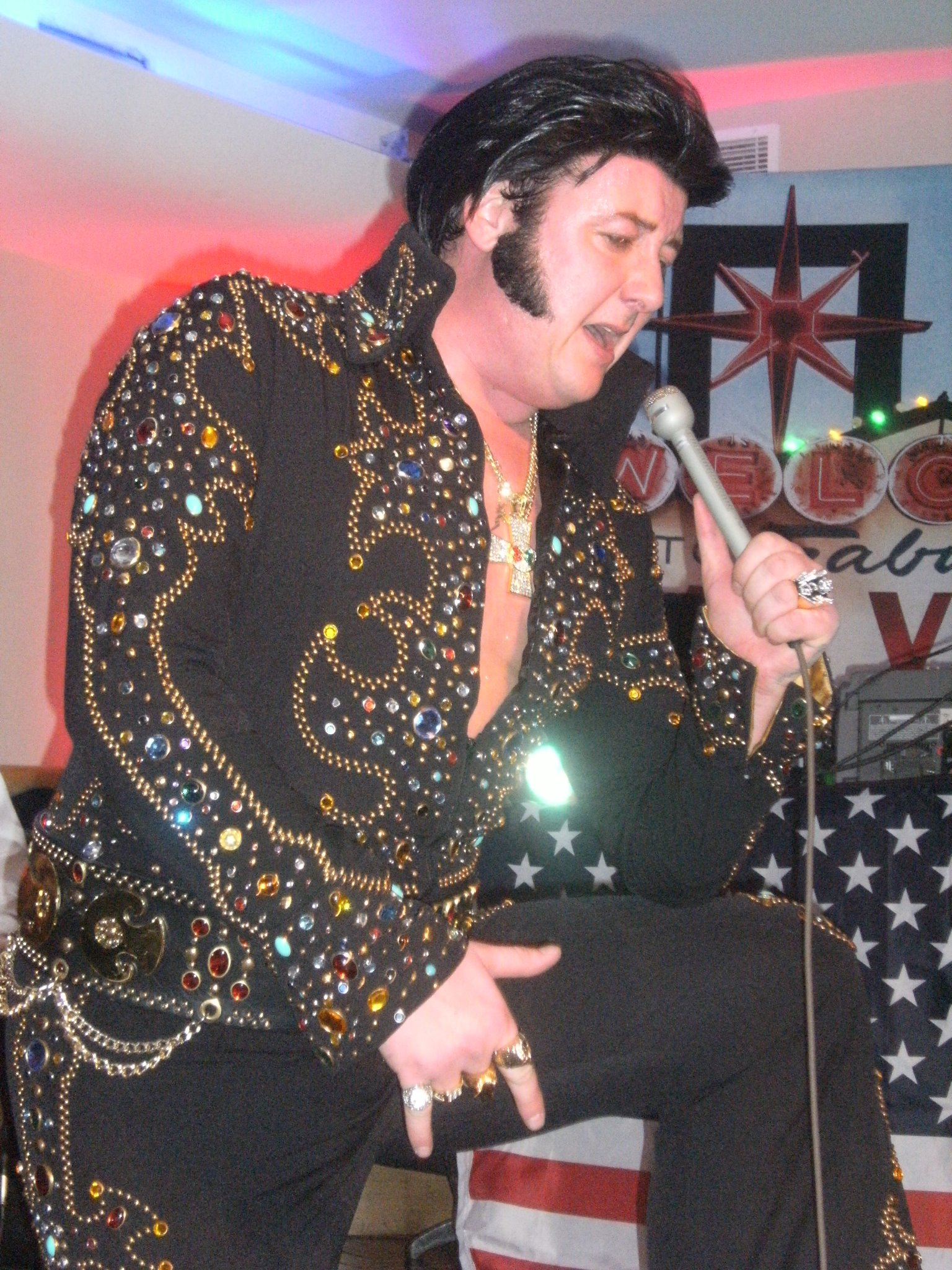
Dean Howe impersonating Elvis Presley

- Entertainment: An "impressionist" impersonates well-known figures in order to entertain an audience. Especially popular objects of impersonation are Elvis Presley (see Elvis impersonator), Michael Jackson (see Michael Jackson impersonator) and Madonna (see Madonna impersonator). Other uses of impersonation for entertainment include male drag queens (previously called "female impersonators", although this terminology is now considered outdated.)
- Crime: As part of a criminal act such as identity theft. This is usually where the criminal is trying to assume the identity of another, in order to commit fraud, such as accessing confidential information, or to gain property not belonging to them. Also known as social engineering and impostors.
- Decoys, used as a form of protection for political and military figures. This involves an impersonator who is employed (or forced) to perform during public appearances, to mislead observers.
- To create a romantic connection with someone, for example catfishing.

== Celebrity ==
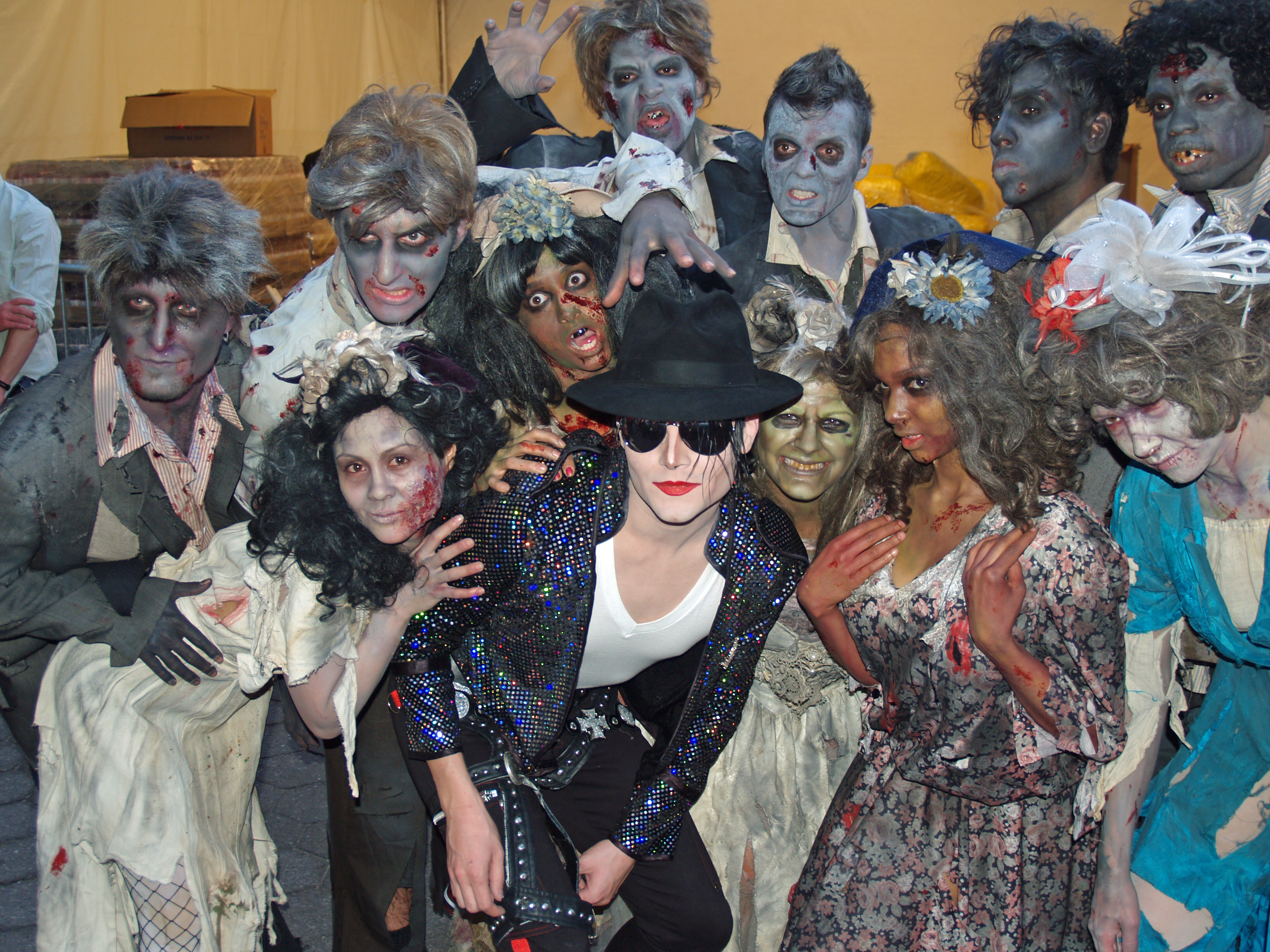
A Michael Jackson impersonator for the 25th anniversary of the album Thriller at the 2008 Tribeca Film Festival with performers from Step It Up and Dance.

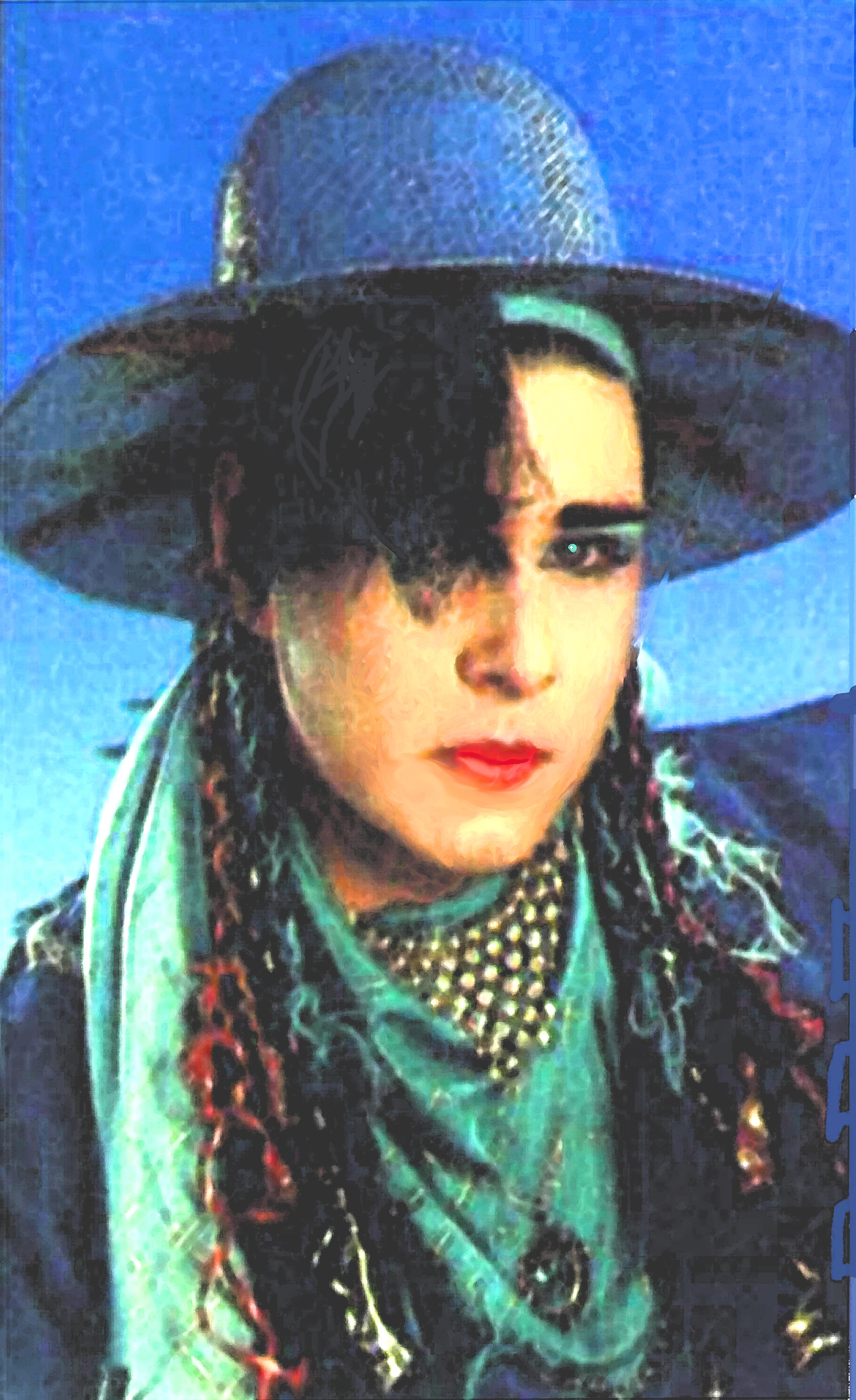
Patrick Knight as Boy George

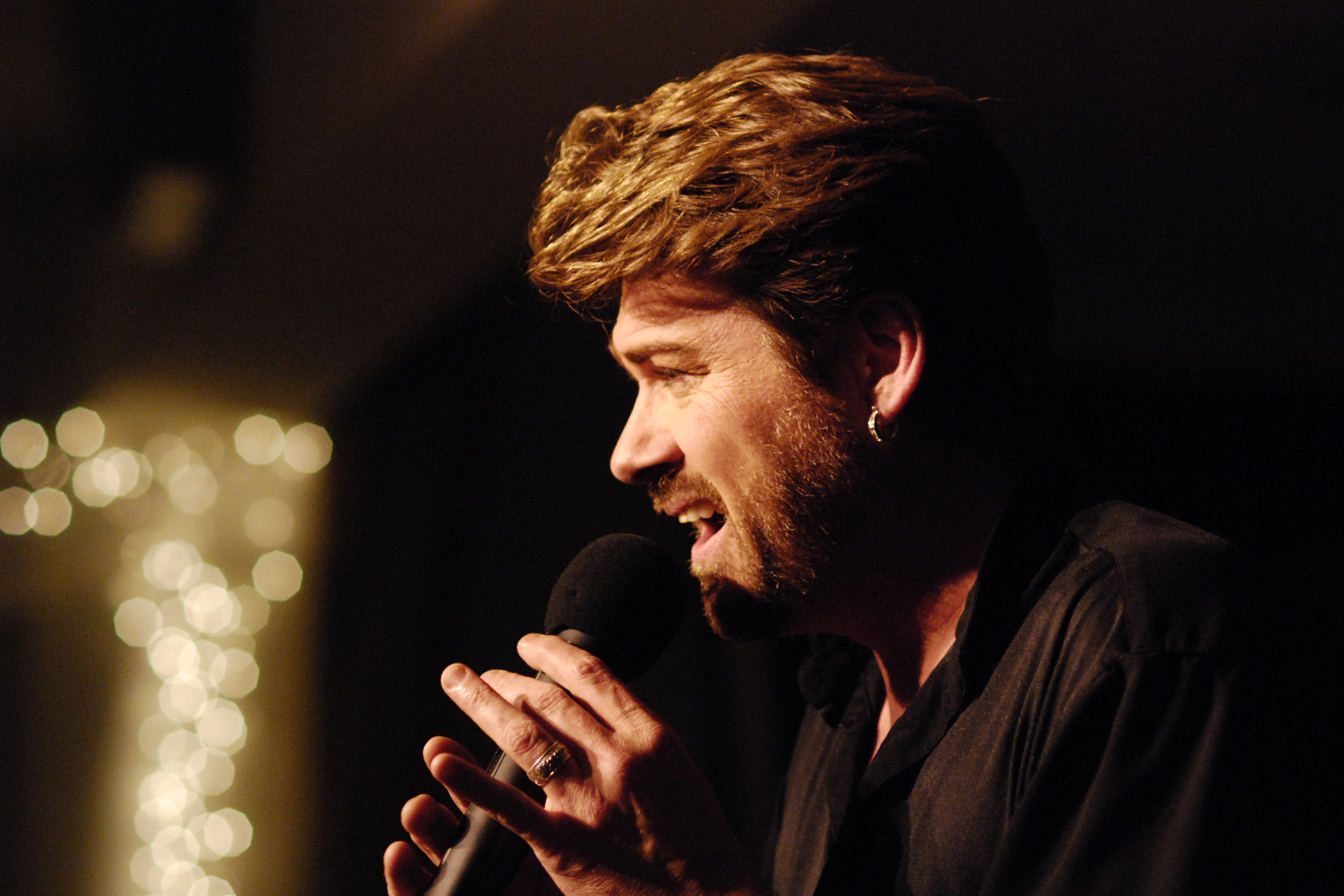
An impersonator of George Michael

Celebrity impersonators look similar to celebrities and dress in such a way as to imitate them. Impersonators are known as sound-alikes, look-alikes, impressionists, imitators and tribute artists.

Some interest in celebrity impersonators, may arise from the consumer desire to see a celebrity who has died. The dead celebrity market was estimated to generate $2.25 billion globally, with celebrity impersonators used in live entertainment shows and advertising.

One of the most prominent examples of this phenomenon is the case of Elvis Presley. Edward Moss has appeared in movies and sitcoms, impersonating Michael Jackson.

There are other motivations for celebrity impersonation, Tom Jones has attracted his share of impersonators from different places around the world. From the United States, to South East Asia, to the UK, there are performers who either sound like him or imitate his act.

A 2010 research study explored how celebrity impersonation performance acts are understood by audiences, within an interactional frame, where the performer and audience collaborate by recognising the 'game' of pretending to be a celebrity. It proposed that this type of impersonation goes beyond imitation and is in fact a complex interaction, where the real and artificial coexist comfortably.

== Criminal ==
A person who impersonates a designated officer in the United Kingdom faces a prison term not to exceed 51 weeks in England, one year in Scotland, or 6 months in Northern Ireland.

In the United States, it is an offence to impersonate a federal officer. In 2025, there were a number of arrests, due to civilians impersonating immigration officials, whilst the FBI began to probe an effort to access the personal phone of Susie Wiles, the White House chief of staff, that had involved impersonation.

In a Colorado case, an immigrant was charged with "criminal impersonation" for using another person's Social Security number when signing up for a job, some courts have ruled that supplying this wrong information may not be criminal. The ruling hinges on whether there was harm to the other person.

Often, criminal impersonation involves someone impersonating a victim for financial gain. In Australia, a woman in Melbourne used three victims identities to file ten fraudulent business activity statements and registered as a tax agent, in order to commit criminal offences.

== Online ==
The internet has resulted in new forms of impersonators emerging online. This can involve acts such as the impersonation of someone else's identity, across a variety of platforms, such as social media.

Within online dating, the phenomenon of catfishing has arisen, where individuals impersonate the identity of someone else, whilst forming romantic relationships. Motivations for this can include to check on partner fidelity, for monetary gain or simply out of curiosity.

Online impersonation can be used as a cyberbullying tactic, that in some instances creates a permanent and accessible record that anyone can view. This can have a significant impact, such as hindering employment prospects.

Online impersonation has led to debates around whether identity verification should be a requirement on some online platforms. Some jurisdictions are attempting to introduce new laws to help combat this problem, for example in Nepal.

== Deepfake ==
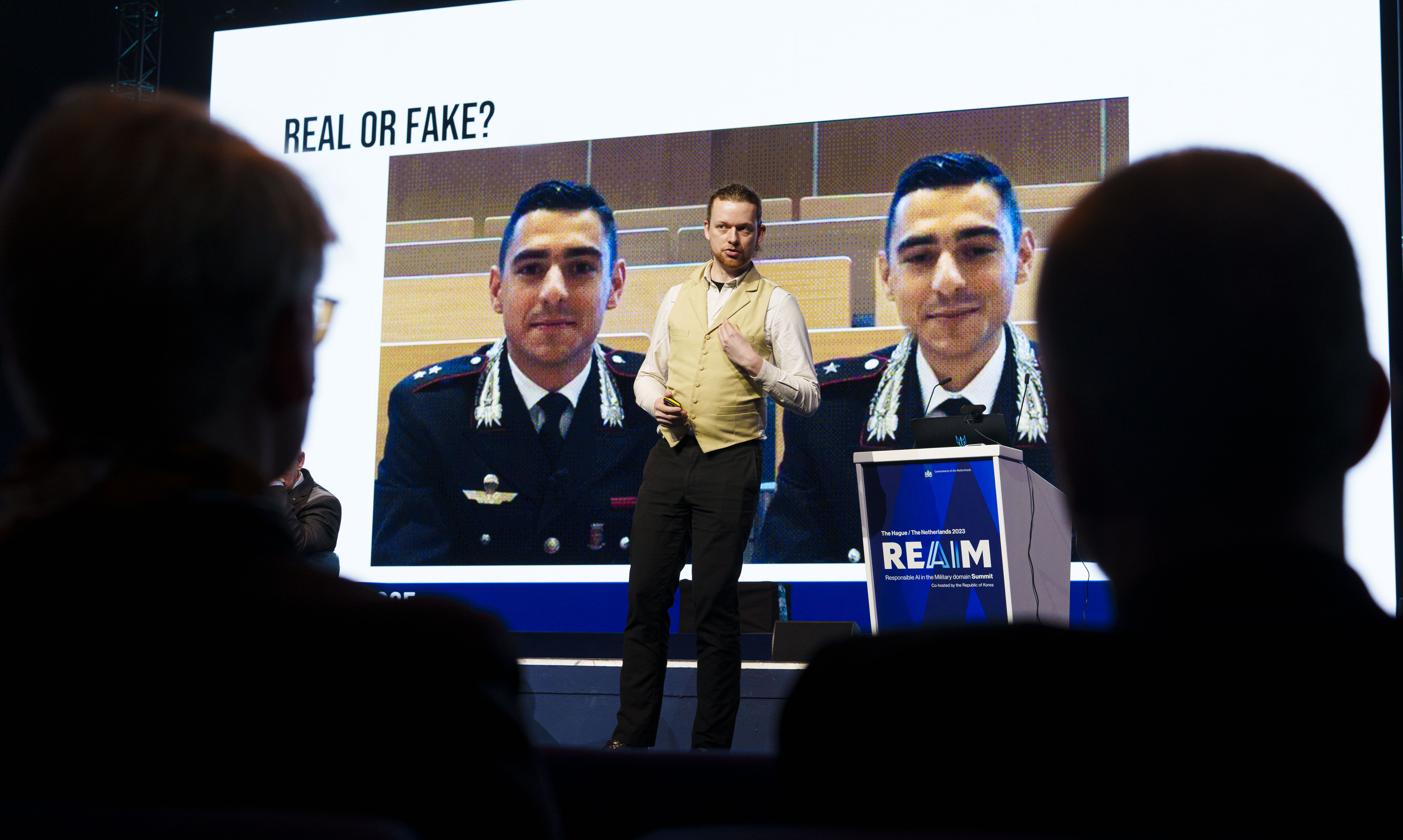
Manipulated content: Is it real or fake?

Audio deepfakes have been used as part of social engineering scams, fooling people into thinking they are receiving instructions from a trusted individual.

In 2019, a UK based energy firm's CEO was scammed over the phone when he was ordered to transfer €220,000 into a Hungarian bank account by an individual who used audio deepfake technology to impersonate the voice of the firm's holding company's chief executive.

The combination advances in deepfake technology, which can clone an individual's voice from a recording of a few seconds to a minute, and new text generation tools, has enabled automated impersonation scams that can target victims using a convincing digital clone of someone known to the person.

Celebrity impersonation has been conducted using deepfake technology, for different purposes. For entertainment purposes, deepfake celebrity impersonation has been used. A number of cases were reported that involved scam victims believing they were communicating with celebrities.

== See also ==
- Fake memoir
- Impressionist
- Look-alike
- Personation
- Police impersonation
- Shi (personator), in the Chinese ancestor ritual: a figure impersonating ancestors
- Soundboard, victim soundboard
- Tribute act
- Wannabe
- Identity fraud
- Identity theft
- Celebrity impersonation scams on social media
