= Political decoy =

Person employed to impersonate a politician

A political decoy is a person employed to impersonate a politician, to draw attention away from the real person or to take risks on that person's behalf. This can also apply to military figures, or civilians impersonated for political or espionage purposes.

The political decoy is an individual who has been selected because of a strong physical resemblance to the person being impersonated. This resemblance can be strengthened by plastic surgery. Often, such decoys are trained to speak and behave like the "target".

== Political decoys in history ==
Since deception is the whole purpose of employing a political decoy, many instances of alleged decoying remain uncertain.

Joe R. Reeder, an undersecretary for the U.S. Army from 1993 to 1997, has gone on record with claims that a number of figures around the world have or have had decoys, including Manuel Noriega, Raoul Cédras, Enver Hoxha, Fidel Castro, and Osama bin Laden.

Of Noriega's four alleged decoys, Reeder said, "They were good: They practiced his gait, his manner of speech and his modus operandi – what he did during the day and night."

Information on these instances of decoying is hard to come by. And falsely accusing an enemy of using a decoy can be an effective psychological operations tactic (making an enemy seem like a coward who dare not appear in person, for example).

This means that the confusion generated by the existence of real decoys is deepened by counterclaims of decoys where there may be none.

The case of Osama bin Laden is instructive. In the absence of confirmed sightings of him, many sources openly speculated that videotaped messages from bin Laden were in fact recordings of a double – either as part of a "frame-up" operation, or as part of a strategy of deception on bin Laden's part.

Speculation in such situations is naturally liable to run high. For the purposes of this entry, only well-documented allegations or confirmed cases of political decoying are discussed. Instances which are still under debate will have section headings below in quotes.

=== Bernard Montgomery / Clifton James and "Tex" Banwell (1944) ===
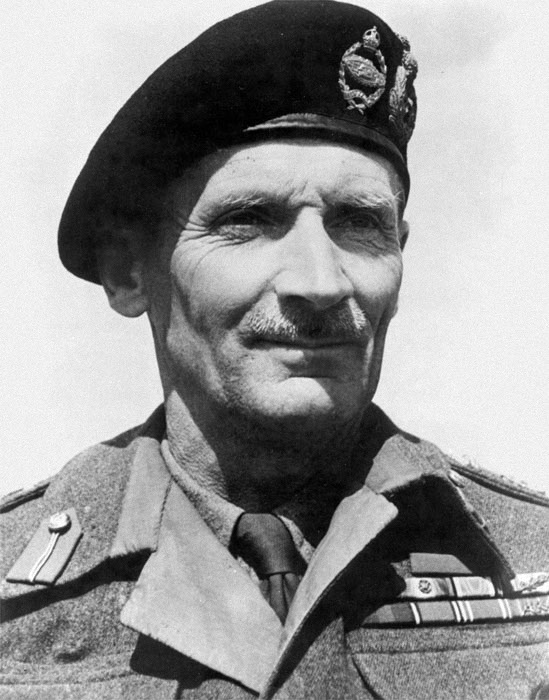
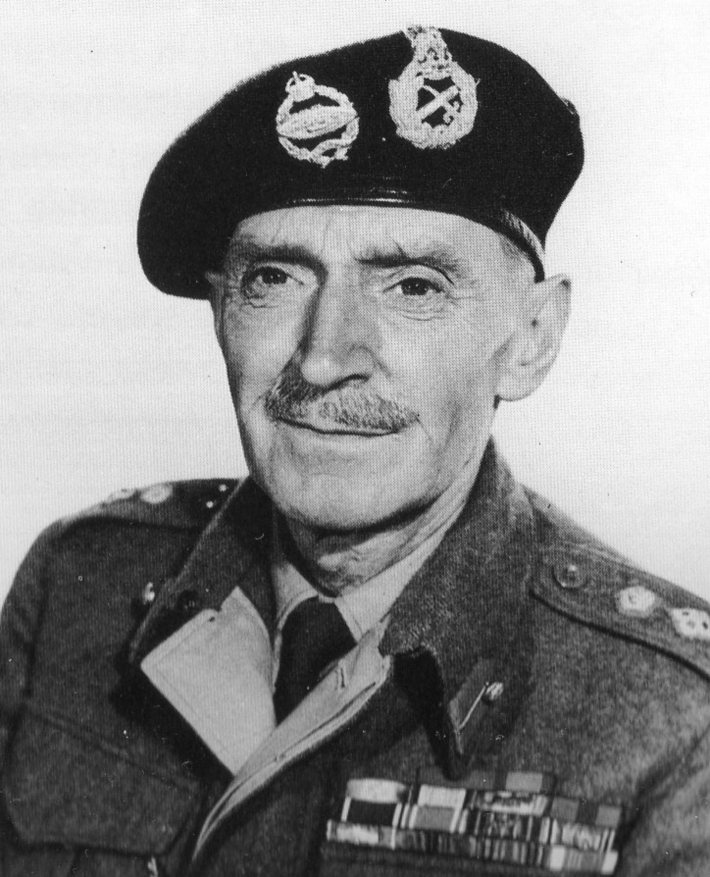
General Bernard Montgomery (left) and M. E. Clifton James

Soldier M. E. Clifton James successfully impersonated Field Marshal Bernard Montgomery for intelligence purposes during World War II. In 1940, James acted in an Army production called When Knights Were Bold and his photograph appeared in an Army newspaper with a remark about how much he resembled General Montgomery.

As a result, he was approached by actor David Niven in May 1944. Niven, then a Colonel in the Army Kinematograph Section, told James he wanted him to impersonate "Monty", as this would allow Montgomery to be somewhere else, thus confusing the Germans.

James had to learn Montgomery's gestures, mannerisms, gait and voice and had to give up smoking.

Because James had lost his right-hand middle finger in the First World War, a realistic replacement was made.

Even his wife had to be deceived and was both kept in the dark and sent back to Leicester. Once he was trained, his trip as "Monty" was to Gibraltar and from there to Algiers. "Monty's" presence succeeded in confusing the Germans in regard to the invasion plans.

James was later the subject of a biopic called I Was Monty's Double starring James himself in the double role as Monty and himself.

The second (and less famous) "Monty's Double", Keith Deamer Banwell, was serving with the land-based Long Range Desert Group.

Banwell was captured in a raid on Tobruk, but with a friend managed to steal a German vehicle and escape. During a subsequent raid on Crete he was taken prisoner at Heraklion and put under the personal supervision of former world heavyweight boxing champion Max Schmeling, who was serving in the German Army.

Banwell and a few of his comrades managed to slip away from their captors and then acquired an assault landing craft. With the help of some Cretan fishermen they made their getaway, but the craft ran out of fuel and drifted for 9 days before reaching the North African coast. The privations of this voyage put Banwell in hospital for 12 weeks.

When he had recovered, someone noticed that he bore a resemblance to General Montgomery. It was decided that he participate in deception ploys, and so Banwell was sent to Cairo to meet Montgomery, given the appropriate clothing, insignia and General's badges and sent on trips around the Middle East to confuse enemy spies.

However, as he was considerably taller than Montgomery, he was told that on no account should he get out of the car. Banwell, finding the assignment boring, sought a return to the infantry.

=== Joseph Stalin / "Rashid" / Felix Dadaev (1940s–1950s) ===
Soviet leader Joseph Stalin is alleged to have had a double, identified only as "Rashid". Officials at the KGB allegedly learned that Rashid was a "double" for Stalin and employed him to replace Stalin for some public functions after World War II. Rashid spent two years studying with Aleksei Dikiy, an actor who played the role of Stalin in propaganda films. Rashid claimed there were other Stalin lookalikes employed by the KGB, although he never met any. He claimed to have heard of another Stalin double who was hired to live in the leader's dacha outside of Moscow in the late 1940s and 1950s when Stalin was dying. This double filled in for Stalin for media events and at times when Stalin had to meet government functionaries and others. Rashid died in 1991, aged 93.

In 2008 another one of Stalin's doubles, Felix Dadaev, came forward, having written a book about his adventures as a political decoy. The Putin government gave him permission to tell his story at age 88. He appeared in a 2014 documentary about Stalin's last days on German television.

=== Sukarno / unknown (1950s) ===
The U.S. Central Intelligence Agency (CIA) had planned to bring down Indonesia's first president Sukarno by portraying him in a pornographic film in the late 1950s. The agency put together a pornographic film starring a Sukarno look-alike in bed with a blonde playing a Soviet agent. The humiliation caused by circulating the film was supposed to drive Sukarno from office.

=== Henry Kissinger / unknown (1971) ===
A former aide to Henry Kissinger has gone on the record with claims that Kissinger was impersonated at least once during his secret visit to China in 1971. Since no one was allowed to examine 'Kissinger' at close quarters, the resemblance of the impersonator to his 'target' must remain under some doubt.

=== Boris Yeltsin / unknown (1996–2000) ===
In 1998, Duma deputy Aleksandr Salii asked the office of the Russian Prosecutor-General to investigate claims that a double had been impersonating Boris Yeltsin for official purposes since the real Yeltsin's heart surgery in November 1996. Salii told journalists that he and colleagues had examined some 1,500 photographs and gathered evidence showing that a "New Yeltsin" had appeared after 1996, with the supposed decoy frequently displaying his injured hand, whereas the real Yeltsin had always tried to conceal that hand. Yeltsin had frequently disappeared from public view in preceding years, sometimes in circumstances that aroused widespread suspicion. In July 1995, Yeltsin disappeared from public view for weeks following a heart operation. A photograph of Yeltsin was released to dispel rumours about his health, which actually inflamed the situation when it emerged that it appeared to be a manipulated photograph composited from an earlier photograph taken some months prior.

=== Saddam Hussein / several unknowns (1990s–2003) ===
In 2003, German television network ZDF broadcast claimed that Iraq's former president Saddam Hussein was frequently replaced with doubles for TV appearances. This analysis was based on sophisticated measuring techniques, which detected discrepancies in the position of Hussein's facial features and blemishes from appearance to appearance. It was supported by the opinion of Jerrold Post, the man who created the CIA's Psychological Profile Unit. It was also alleged that Austrian politician Jörg Haider had actually met a double when he thought he was meeting Hussein.

However, those claims are disputed: Ala Bashir, Saddam Hussein's former personal physician, stated, "The stories about Saddam Hussein having body doubles, to foster the impression that the Iraqi dictator was everywhere, are nonsense."

== Voice-only decoys ==
These are generally exceptionally good impersonators, who are used to give the impression that their "target" is conducting a radio interview, telephone call or other vocal assignment.

=== Winston Churchill / Norman Shelley (1940s) ===
A recurring rumour holds that some of Winston Churchill's most famous speeches to Parliament during World War II were subsequently recorded for radio broadcast not by Churchill, but by Norman Shelley impersonating Churchill. Churchill is known to have commented that Shelley's impersonations were excellent. Although the rumour has been promoted by some historians, there is a lack of supporting evidence, and it is best classified as an urban legend. Shelley did however record a performance of Churchill's "We shall fight on the beaches" speech, but that was several years after the speech was originally made.

=== Harry S. Truman / unknown impersonator (1947) ===
Edwin Wright served the U.S. federal government under President Harry S. Truman as General staff G-2 and Middle East specialist, Washington (1945–46); on the Bureau of Near East-South Asian-African Affairs, Department of State (1946 onwards); country specialist (1946–47); advisor U.N. affairs (1947–50); and advisor on intelligence (1950–55).

According to Wright, an unknown individual impersonated President Truman's voice on the telephone in order to sway foreign leaders into voting in particular ways at the United Nations.

There are two documents from Truman himself alleging this, both currently lodged at the Truman Presidential Library.

In the first, Truman wrote:

Something's going on and I don't know what it is. Somebody called up the President of Haiti and he said that it was I ... . He said, "We want you to vote for the Zionist program." As a result the President of Haiti changed his vote to satisfy what he thought was me. I don't know who this fellow was that called him up.

Wright comments

"In other words, somebody impersonated President Truman and threatened the President of Haiti. There were people who used President Truman's voice and name and he didn't know who they were."

=== Indira Gandhi / impersonator Rustom Nagarwala (1971) ===
In a cross-gender voice impersonation in 1971, a former captain of the Indian Army named Rustom Sohrab Nagarwala (male) was able to take out 6 million rupees from the State Bank of India by mimicking the voice of prime minister Indira Gandhi to chief cashier Ved Prakash Malhotra. Nagarwala was arrested, however, after Malhotra went in person to collect a receipt from P.N. Haksar, Indira Gandhi's personal secretary, informing him that the requested payment was done. A stunned Haksar informed Malhotra that Mrs. Gandhi had instructed nothing of the sort and urged him to inform the police immediately. Later that year, Nagarwala died of a heart attack in prison.

== Other alleged decoys ==
=== Queen Elizabeth I and the Bisley Boy ===
For many years, the story of the Bisley Boy tempted people into believing that Queen Elizabeth I of England was really a man. According to the legend, Elizabeth (then a princess) had died aged 10 while staying at Berkeley Castle, Gloucestershire. Her minders, terrified of the retribution of her father, Henry VIII, made a substitution. They tried to find a lookalike girl of sufficient education, but could not find one, so a lookalike boy from the nearby village of Bisley was put in her place and sworn to secrecy. This legend claimed to explain why Elizabeth never married, why she went bald in middle age, and why she said she had the heart and stomach of a king in the Tilbury speech. Proponents of the "Bisley Boy" story included Bram Stoker in his 1910 nonfiction book Famous Impostors. According to Laurie Lee, his mother always referred to Elizabeth as "the Bisley boy".

It is possible that the tale was invented as a joke by a local clergyman in the 19th century.

=== Resurrected Jesus ===
Some theories postulate that the resurrection of Jesus can be explained as a deliberate act of an impersonation.

=== Japan ===
In Japan, during the Sengoku period, military commanders prepared substitutes called kagemusha, meaning "shadow samurai". This was a closely guarded secret however, and few historical records remain.

== See also ==
- Alleged doubles of Adolf Hitler
- Alleged doubles of Vladimir Putin
- Body double
- Doppelgänger
- Identity theft
- Impersonation
- Look-alike

=== In fiction ===
- Dave
- The Devil's Double
- The Dictator
- Double Star
- Kagemusha
- Metal Gear Solid V: The Phantom Pain
- Wait for Me in Heaven
- Moon Over Parador
- The Tercentenary Incident
