= Committee on International Information Activities =

The U.S. President's Committee on International Information Activities (the Jackson Committee) was appointed on January 24, 1953, by President Dwight D. Eisenhower in order to survey and evaluate the government’s information and related policies and activities with particular reference to international relations and the national security. In his announcement on January 26 President Eisenhower said, "It has long been my conviction that a unified and dynamic effort in this field is essential to the security of the United States and of the peoples in the community of free nations."

The Jackson Committee first met on January 30, 1953, and, during its existence, interviewed over 250 witnesses, including many representatives of government departments and agencies. It also consulted with members of Congress, studied much highly classified material furnished by various agencies, and received a large volume of correspondence both from government officials and from members of the public and private organizations.

== Committee findings ==
The Committee presented a security classified report to the President on June 30, 1953, with its conclusions and recommendations being turned over to the United States National Security Council for study. A White House press release issued on July 8 summarized the Committee’s unclassified findings and recommendations. The Committee’s pessimistic assessment of the Soviet Union’s intentions reflects the pervasive Cold War atmosphere of the 1950s. The Committee stressed that "there is no reliable evidence that the recent changes in the Soviet regime and in Soviet tactics involve any change in the basic Soviet objective of a communist world controlled by the Kremlin," and went on to state that "in the struggle between the imposed coalition dominated by the Kremlin and the free coalition led by the United States, the latter must base its policies on the assumption that the purpose of the Soviet rulers is world domination and that this purpose will constitute the fundamental motivation of all their actions." The United States and its allies had to, therefore, "continue to strengthen their military capabilities until it is possible to perceive with clarity that the Soviet Union is unwilling to risk general war, has abandoned its goal of world domination, and will live up to its obligations under the charter of the United Nations."

== Operations Coordinating Board ==
One of the Committee’s recommendations called for the establishment within the National Security Council structure of an Operations Coordinating Board, whose chief function would be to coordinate the formulation by government agencies of detailed operational plans to carry out national security policies. At the same time the Committee recommended that the Psychological Strategy Board, created in 1951, be abolished because that Board had apparently been founded on the notion that psychological activities and strategy existed apart from official policies and actions, a concept repudiated by the Committee. Instead, it assumed that every diplomatic, economic and military action of the United States Government had a psychological aspect or implication. The Committee also idealistically urged that the terms "Cold War" and "psychological warfare" be discarded in favor of others which better described the United States’ true goals.

== U.S. Information Agency ==
The Committee’s July 8 release discussed the goals and techniques of the United States' overseas information programs and called for the consolidation of these programs into one service. The result was the establishment of the United States Information Agency in August 1953. The Committee also pointed out the need for improved guidance and technical controls of programs in individual countries and urged the development of a better understanding of U.S. information programs by the American public.

== Committee members ==
- William Harding Jackson, Chairman
- Robert Cutler
- Charles Douglas Jackson
- Roger Kyes
- Sigurd Larmon
- Gordon Gray
- Barklie McKee Henry
- John C. Hughes
- Abbott Washburn, Executive Secretary

== See also ==
- U.S. President's Committee on Information Activities Abroad
