= C. D. Jackson =

U.S. presidential adviser and magazine publisher (1902–1964)

- Jackson in 1937
- Born: Charles Douglas Jackson; March 16, 1902; New York City, U.S.
- Died: September 18, 1964 (aged 62); New York City, U.S.
- Education: Princeton University (A.B., 1924)
- Occupations: publisher; magazine executive; psychological warfare specialist; presidential adviser
- Employer: Time Inc.
- Organizations: Office of War Information; Allied Force Headquarters; Supreme Headquarters Allied Expeditionary Force; Free Europe Committee; Radio Free Europe; White House
- Known for: Deputy Chief, Psychological Warfare Branch, Allied Force Headquarters; Deputy Chief, Psychological Warfare Division, SHAEF; President of the Free Europe Committee; Special Assistant to the President for International Affairs; Publisher of Fortune and Life

Charles Douglas (C. D.) Jackson (March 16, 1902 – September 18, 1964), commonly known as C. D. Jackson, was an American publisher, psychological warfare specialist, and presidential adviser. A senior executive at Time Inc., he served during World War II as Deputy Chief of the Psychological Warfare Branch at Allied Forces Headquarters and later as Deputy Chief of the Psychological Warfare Division at Supreme Headquarters Allied Expeditionary Force. After the war, he remained active in anti-communist information work through Time-Life International, the Free Europe Committee, Radio Free Europe, and the Eisenhower administration, where he served as Special Assistant to the President for International Affairs.

== Early life and Time Inc. ==
Jackson was born in New York City. After graduating from Princeton University in 1924, he entered the private sector. In 1931 he took a position as Assistant to the President of Time Inc. In 1940 he was President of the Council for Democracy, and from 1942 to 1943, Special Assistant to U.S. Ambassador to Turkey, Laurence Steinhardt.

== World War II psychological warfare ==
During World War II, Jackson represented the Office of War Information in Allied psychological warfare organizations. Before joining the Psychological Warfare Branch in North Africa, he had served on a special mission in Turkey with U.S. Ambassador Laurence Steinhardt. In April 1943, he became the senior civilian OWI official with the Psychological Warfare Branch, Allied Force Headquarters, in Algiers.

In North Africa, Jackson worked closely with British propagandist R. H. S. Crossman. Historian James Erdmann describes Jackson as the key OWI figure in North Africa and credits Crossman and Jackson with giving PWB more aggressive leadership, pushing psychological warfare toward enemy forces rather than only occupied audiences, and bringing a more activist journalistic and public-relations style into the organization.

In 1944, Jackson became one of the civilian deputy chiefs of the Psychological Warfare Division at Supreme Headquarters Allied Expeditionary Force, serving under Brigadier General Robert A. McClure. In PWD/SHAEF’s multiple-deputy system, Jackson represented OWI, while R. H. S. Crossman represented the British Political Warfare Executive, Dennis Routh represented SOE/MOI, and Fred Oeschner represented OSS. Jackson shared in policy formulation for Allied psychological warfare and had responsibility for areas including foreign civil liaison, news and pictorial work, and radio. Jackson also helped recruit Frank Kaufman, later chief of the PWD/SHAEF Leaflet Section.

During the late stages of the war, Jackson directed the Allied Information Service, which distributed information about the Allied war effort to France and other liberated areas. Erdmann later identified Jackson as McClure’s chief civilian deputy and suggested that former PWD/SHAEF personnel such as McClure and Jackson may have influenced the postwar development of American national and military propaganda agencies.

== Postwar information work ==
After the war, Jackson was managing director of Time-Life International. He later characterized his job as "waging psychological warfare against the Communists" under the guidance of Time's founder Henry Luce. In 1949, Jackson became publisher of Fortune magazine. From 1951 to 1952, he was president of the anticommunist Free Europe Committee, and was a speechwriter for Dwight Eisenhower's successful 1952 presidential campaign.

== Eisenhower administration ==
After Eisenhower was inaugurated, Jackson became a presidential advisor on psychological warfare, with "special responsibilities in the 'cold war' planning" of the administration. When joining the White House, Jackson took a leave of absence from Fortune. His new job title was Special Assistant to the President for International Affairs, with a salary of $15,000 a year. In this capacity, he worked closely with the Psychological Strategy Board, the Committee on International Information Activities and the Operations Coordinating Board, serving as an official member of the latter. The Eisenhower Library describes his main function as coordinating activities that interpreted world events to the advantage of the United States and its allies and exploited incidents that reflected negatively on the Soviet Union, Communist China, and other Cold War adversaries. Jackson was reportedly one of the writers of Eisenhower's "Atoms for Peace" speech delivered at the UN General Assembly in December 1953. Jackson represented the U.S. as a delegate at the UN's Ninth General Assembly in late 1954.

In his book about Jackson's contributions to Cold War foreign policy, John Allen Stern writes that Jackson was not among Eisenhower's extreme war hawks:

Whereas Jackson wanted to quietly capture the loyalties of the non-aligned nations and make inroads into the Eastern Bloc, as well as strengthen our position with England and France...(John Foster) Dulles opted for outright coercion and applied bullying tactics.

Jackson opposed the anticommunist zealotry of Senator Joseph McCarthy, and urged Eisenhower to not take steps that would seem to appease McCarthy.

In the early 1950s, Jackson helped establish the Bilderberg Group and ensured U.S. participation. He attended most of the Bilderberg Group meetings from 1954 to 1964.

Jackson was instrumental in creating Radio Free Europe, and he defended its mission to promote American values throughout the world. When the organization was accused of fomenting anti-Soviet rebellions behind the Iron Curtain, he stated: "Over the years, Radio Free Europe has never, in a single broadcast or leaflet, deviated from its essential policy, and did not broadcast a single program during the recent Polish and Hungarian developments which could be described as an 'incitement' program." To counter Soviet propaganda about the mistreatment of Negroes in the U.S., Jackson emphasized "the significant progress toward full equality brought about by the democratic system", and championed Porgy and Bess as illustrative of the social and cultural advancement that was occurring. His White House records document work on Korea, prisoner-of-war repatriation, the 1953 East German uprising, food relief for East Germany, Stalin’s death, unrest in satellite Europe, Southeast Asia, atomic energy, propaganda balloons, international broadcasting, and major Eisenhower speeches including the Chance for Peace and Atoms for Peace addresses.

== Later career and Zapruder film ==
In the late 1950s, Jackson resumed working in the publishing industry. He was administrative vice president at Life magazine, and then in April 1960 was promoted to publisher of the magazine. In 1958 he briefly returned to the White House to aid President Eisenhower as a speechwriter and consultant during the Lebanon crisis.

After Abraham Zapruder recorded his famous home movie in Dallas on November 22, 1963—in which he filmed the assassination of President John F. Kennedy—Jackson was involved in the negotiations that acquired all rights to the Zapruder film on behalf of Life magazine. Upon watching the disturbing film on November 24, Jackson ordered it locked away and denied public viewing until an appropriate later time.

Jackson was Time Inc.'s Senior Vice President before his death at age 62 in September 1964.

== See also ==
- U.S. President's Committee on Information Activities Abroad
