= Project Happy Days =

1957 CIA operation

Robert Maheu, who handled the film production for Happy Days

Project Happy Days was a clandestine operation through which the Central Intelligence Agency (CIA) of the United States attempted to undermine President Sukarno of Indonesia by forging a pornographic film of him committing adultery. Undertaken in 1957, at a time when the CIA considered Sukarno a threat to the United States, the project was based on reports that the Soviet Union's Committee for State Security (KGB) had documented an extramarital affair between the Indonesian president and a Soviet flight attendant. Happy Days was designed to portray Sukarno as a weak individual susceptible to manipulation because of his sexual appetite and undermine his international support.

After a search for existing materials was unsuccessful, the production of a new film was entrusted to Robert Maheu. With the support of Bing and Larry Crosby, he rented a studio and hired actors to be filmed in a sexual encounter; the identities of the actors are unknown, though Sukarno was portrayed by a Hispanic man made to resemble him. Sources differ as to the ultimate fate of the film, including its release status; it is not known to have survived. The project—one of several undertaken by the CIA to overthrow Sukarno—had no impact on the Indonesian president, who remained in power until 1967. Information about the project became public in 1975 during an investigation into the CIA chaired by United States Senator Frank Church.

== Background ==
Sukarno became the President of Indonesia on August 17, 1945, the day he proclaimed the nation's independence. He led the country through a four-year national revolution against returning Dutch colonial forces, which ended in December 1949 with formal recognition of Indonesian sovereignty. By the mid-1950s, Sukarno promoted a policy of neutrality in the Cold War as well as general opposition to what he termed neocolonialism; this was realized, in part, by hosting the Bandung Conference in 1955 to foster a non-aligned sentiment. At the same time, the Soviet Union was offering expansive international aid to Indonesia, and after the 1955 Indonesian legislative election the Communist Party of Indonesia (PKI) controlled approximately a quarter of the People's Consultative Assembly.

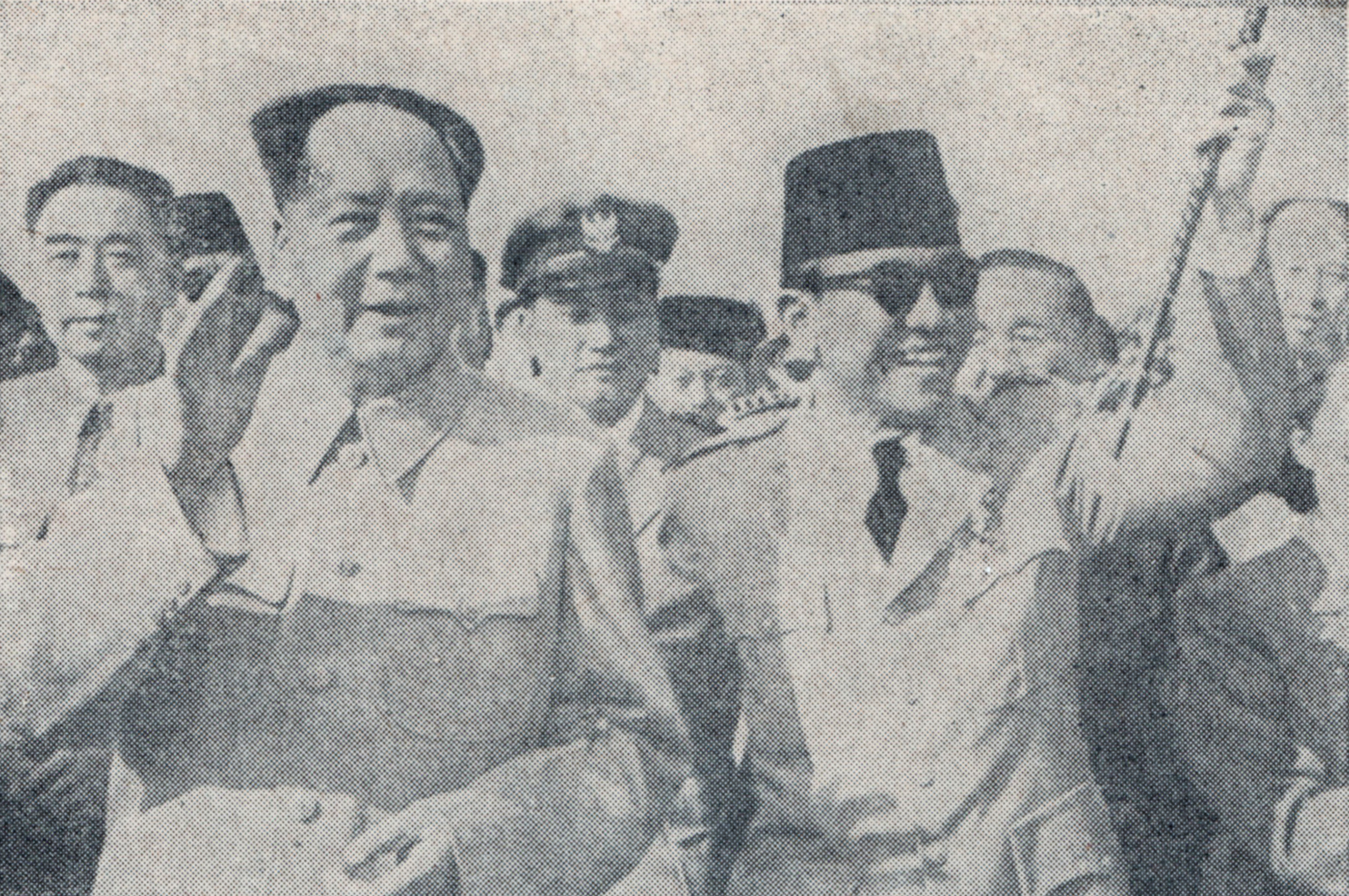
Sukarno (right) with Mao Zedong in China in 1956; Sukarno's role in establishing the Non-Aligned Movement and orientation towards China and the Soviet Union resulted in repeated attempts by the United States to remove him from power.

The United States' Central Intelligence Agency (CIA) was distrustful of Sukarno's professed neutralism, concerned that he would turn to communism, and perceived him as playing the United States and Soviet Union against each other for aid. CIA officer Richard M. Bissell Jr. considered Sukarno to be among the most dangerous threats to the United States. The agency thus conducted numerous operations in Indonesia through the 1950s to destabilize the Sukarno government. These included efforts to influence the 1955 election as well as providing resources to armed dissident groups such as the Revolutionary Government of the Republic of Indonesia (PRRI). These projects were mostly unsuccessful.

== Project ==
Sukarno was known as a womanizer who frequently conducted extramarital affairs. In 1957, the CIA received reports that he had engaged in sexual intercourse with a Soviet flight attendant during his 1956 state visit. This unidentified woman was reported to have accompanied him during his flights within the Soviet Union and traveled with Marshal Kliment Voroshilov during his state visit to Indonesia. According to the reports, this affair was documented by the Soviet Committee for State Security (KGB) and copies of available documentation were sent to the PKI. In internal documents, the CIA implied that Sukarno had come under Soviet control either through the influence of this stewardess or as a result of blackmail. The agency sought to present Sukarno in a compromising position: having sexual relations with a blonde flight attendant.

Chief of Security of the CIA Sheffield Edwards reached out to the Los Angeles Police Department in search of existing pornographic materials. However, after reviewing numerous such works, the agency decided that none could be presented as Sukarno's tryst. Intending to use a Hispanic actor to portray Sukarno, they were unable to find one who resembled him. Likewise, the female performers were deemed insufficiently beautiful to portray the Soviet agent. The CIA thus decided to create its own film to simulate the reported affair.

Film production was entrusted to Robert Maheu, a former assistant to Howard Hughes who had worked extensively with the agency. He hired Bing Crosby and his brother Larry to produce the film. A studio was rented for filming, and a "Hispanic-looking" actor was hired to portray Sukarno. The identities of the performers are unknown. CIA testimony describes the actors as an agency employee and his fiancee, while the American writer Lewis H. Lapham describes them as a Mexican actor and a California waitress wearing a wig. In 1975, Newsweek reported that multiple women were involved.

During filming, only Maheu and the actors were present, with the former having been instructed in working the lights. The male performer was made to resemble Sukarno. Sources differ as to the means; the historian Vincent Bevins writes that he was given heavy makeup to make him look more Indonesian, while the historian William Blum describes the agency as producing a full-face mask. Newsweek, meanwhile, reports the use of plastic surgery. A bald cap was used to increase the potential embarrassment to the Indonesian president, who was believed to rarely remove his peci (skullcap) to protect his vanity.

The film was intended to be presented as a KGB production upon release, thereby permitting the CIA to discredit Sukarno as being manipulated by the Soviet Union. According to Joseph Burkholder Smith, then under the CIA's Deputy Director of Plans, Happy Days was expected to have two benefits. First, although Sukarno's trysts were generally accepted in Indonesia, the project would show Sukarno in a position of weakness; according to Smith, "being tricked, deceived, or otherwise outsmarted by one of the creatures God has provided for man's pleasure cannot be condoned." Second, by presenting Sukarno as unsympathetic, the CIA would provide a basis for shaping international opinion in favor of dissidents should they emerge victorious.

To improve the impact of a proposed film, the CIA amplified rumors of Sukarno's illicit affair with the stewardess. Initially, it intended to disseminate stills from the film using leaflets distributed anonymously throughout Southeast Asia. Sources differ as to the actual extent of distribution. According to CIA documents, the film was never completed or released. Bevins writes that its producers deemed the film too unconvincing, while according to Newsweek the project was shelved after "cooler heads prevailed". Meanwhile, the historian Stephen Kinzer writes that copies were distributed discretely across Southeast Asia and the Encyclopedia of the Central Intelligence Agency records the film and its stills as being disseminated throughout Indonesia. The film is likely lost, as the survival of produced materials is not recorded.

== Aftermath ==
Happy Days had no impact on Sukarno. The capture of Civil Air Transport pilot Allen Lawrence Pope on May 18, 1958, after he bombed Ambon in support of the Permesta rebellion allowed Indonesia to press the United States on its publicly neutral position. Secretary of State John Foster Dulles announced two days later that civil unrest in Indonesia "can be and should be dealt with as an Indonesian problem." The CIA removed its support for the Permesta and PRRI rebellions, which were quashed by the Indonesian government by the early 1960s. American support for these rebellions stressed Indonesia–United States relations, and in later years Sukarno aligned himself more with China. He ruled until 1967, when Suharto assumed power in the aftermath of a failed 1965 coup blamed on the PKI. The CIA had favorably assessed Suharto as supporting its interests, and the United States government provided him and his military with support in consolidating power and during the mass killings of suspected communists.

In 1975, United States Senator Frank Church led an investigation into the CIA's alleged abuse of power. According to the journalist Daniel Schorr, information on Happy Days was among the materials that President Gerald Ford blocked from release, and the final report did not identify the producer of the film or mention the involvement of Sukarno or Maheu. Nonetheless, in June of that year, Newsweek reported the existence of Project Happy Days. After the release of the final report, several news stories also highlighted the project, with an unidentified source confirming the link between Happy Days, Sukarno, and Maheu. Alexander Cockburn described the project as a "blunder" in The Village Voice, writing that Sukarno would have enjoyed the film had he known about it. In a 1976 press conference, CIA director William Colby stated that he was unaware of any other pornographic films produced by the agency. Since then, Happy Days has become one of the best-known CIA operations against Sukarno.

== Works cited ==
- Bevins, Vincent (2020). The Jakarta Method: Washington's Anticommunist Crusade and the Mass Murder Program that Shaped Our World. New York City: PublicAffairs. ISBN 978-1541742406.
- Blum, William (2003). Killing Hope: US Military and CIA Interventions Since World War II. London: Zed Books. ISBN 978-1-84277-369-7.
- Cockburn, Alexander (February 23, 1976). "CIA Sex Blunder" (PDF). Archived from the original (PDF) on September 22, 2026 – via Central Intelligence Agency.
- "Colby Admits Leak to Newspaper". The Evening Gazette. Worcester, Massachusetts. January 27, 1976. p. 2.
- Crewdson, John M. (January 26, 1976). "Secrecy Is Cited". The New York Times. p. 49. Archived from the original on April 17, 2025.
- Degroot, Gerard J. (2009). The Sixties Unplugged: A Kaleidoscopic History of a Disorderly Decade. Cambridge, Massachusetts: Harvard University Press. ISBN 978-0-674-03463-1.
- Freemantle, Brian (1985). CIA. New York: Stein and Day. ISBN 978-0-8128-8159-2.
- Hanna, Willard A. (August 17, 2026). "Sukarno". Encyclopedia Britannica. Archived from the original on August 23, 2026.
- Kahin, Audrey; Kahin, George McTurnan (1995). Subversion as Foreign Policy: The Secret Eisenhower and Dulles Debacle in Indonesia. New York: The New Press. ISBN 978-1-56584-244-1.
- Kinzer, Stephen (2013). The Brothers: John Foster Dulles, Allen Dulles, and Their Secret World War. New York: Times Books. ISBN 978-0-8050-9497-8.
- Lapham, Lewis (2001). Lights, Camera, Democracy!. New York: Random House Publishing. ISBN 978-0-679-64713-3.
- Legge, John D. (1972). Sukarno: A Political Biography. London: Penguin Books. ISBN 978-0-7139-0244-0.
- "Lights, Action, Dirty Tricks". Newsweek. New York. June 23, 1975. p. 15.
- "Porno Movie on Sukarno Too?". Pacific Daily News. Agama Heights, Guam. June 17, 1975. p. 10.
- Ranelagh, John (1986). The Agency: The Rise and Decline of the CIA. New York: Simon and Schuster. ISBN 978-0-671-44318-4.
- Ricklefs, Merle Calvin (1981). A History of Modern Indonesia, c. 1300 to the Present. London: MacMillan. ISBN 978-0-333-24378-7.
- Schorr, Daniel (2001). Staying Tuned: A Life in Journalism. New York: Simon and Schuster. ISBN 978-0-7434-2706-7.
- Smith, Joseph Burkholder (1981). Portrait of a Cold Warrior: Second Thoughts of a Top CIA Agent. New York: Ballantine Books. ISBN 978-0-345-29839-3.
- Smith, W. Thomas (2003). Encyclopedia of the Central Intelligence Agency. New York: Infobase. ISBN 978-1-4381-3018-7.
- "Subject: Robert A. Maheu" (PDF). Central Intelligence Agency. 1975. Archived from the original (PDF) on March 3, 2026 – via archives.org. Document 104-10122-10141.
- Thomas, Evan (1996). The Very Best Men: The Early Years of the CIA. New York: Simon and Schuster. ISBN 978-0-684-81025-6.
- Trenta, Luca (2024). The President's Kill List: Assassination and US Foreign Policy since 1945. Edinburgh: Edinburgh University Press. ISBN 978-1-3995-1951-9.
- Waldman, Myron S. (January 31, 1976). "Undercover Plot on Sukarno". Newsday. Suffolk. p. 8.
