= U.S. President's Committee on Information Activities Abroad =

The U.S. President's Committee on Information Activities Abroad (the Sprague Committee) was created in 1959 by President Dwight D. Eisenhower in order to review the findings and recommendations of the Committee on International Information Activities (the Jackson Committee) in its report dated June 30, 1953, and consider changes in the international situation which affect the validity of the findings and recommendations in that report.

The Sprague Committee’s staff included representatives of the White House, Central Intelligence Agency, U.S. Department of Defense, Department of State, and the United States Information Agency. The Committee also employed several consultants.

The Sprague Committee held the first of 18 formal meetings on February 29-March 1, 1960, and met for the last time on December 27, 1960. The Committee took over nine months to complete its business and experienced some delays and complications stemming from the 1960 presidential campaign. In October 1960 the White House felt compelled to refute an allegation that the Sprague Committee had drawn conclusions regarding the status of the United States’ prestige abroad, a political issue during the campaign.

On December 23, 1960, the Sprague Committee submitted its finished product, "Conclusions and Recommendations of the President’s Committee on Information Activities Abroad," to President Eisenhower. This report called for substantial expansion of the United States’ information efforts, especially in such developing areas as Africa and Latin America. The Committee urged extensive training of government personnel in informational and psychological aspects of policy, recommended increased assistance to educational development abroad, and expansion of exchange programs including those with the Soviet Bloc, and pointed out the need to pay attention to the impact on foreign opinion of U.S. economic, scientific and military programs and activities. It also suggested that United States diplomacy place more emphasis on public opinion during the conduct of negotiations and conferences, the selection of foreign service personnel and in the treatment of foreign visitors. Finally, the Committee also urged that the Operations Coordinating Board be continued and strengthened. The seemingly perpetual cold war between the United States and the Soviet Union was undoubtedly the primary reason for the establishment of the Sprague Committee and clearly influenced the tone of the report and the nature of the recommendations. The Committee was particularly concerned with Soviet influence in underdeveloped countries.

== Committee members ==
- Mansfield D. Sprague, Chairman
- Charles Douglas Jackson
- Philip D. Reed
- Livingston T. Merchant
- George V. Allen
- Allen W. Dulles
- Gordon Gray
- Karl G. Harr Jr.
- John N. Irwin II
- Waldemar A. Nielsen, Executive Director
