= Operation First Light 2024 =

International police operation targeting Internet Scammers

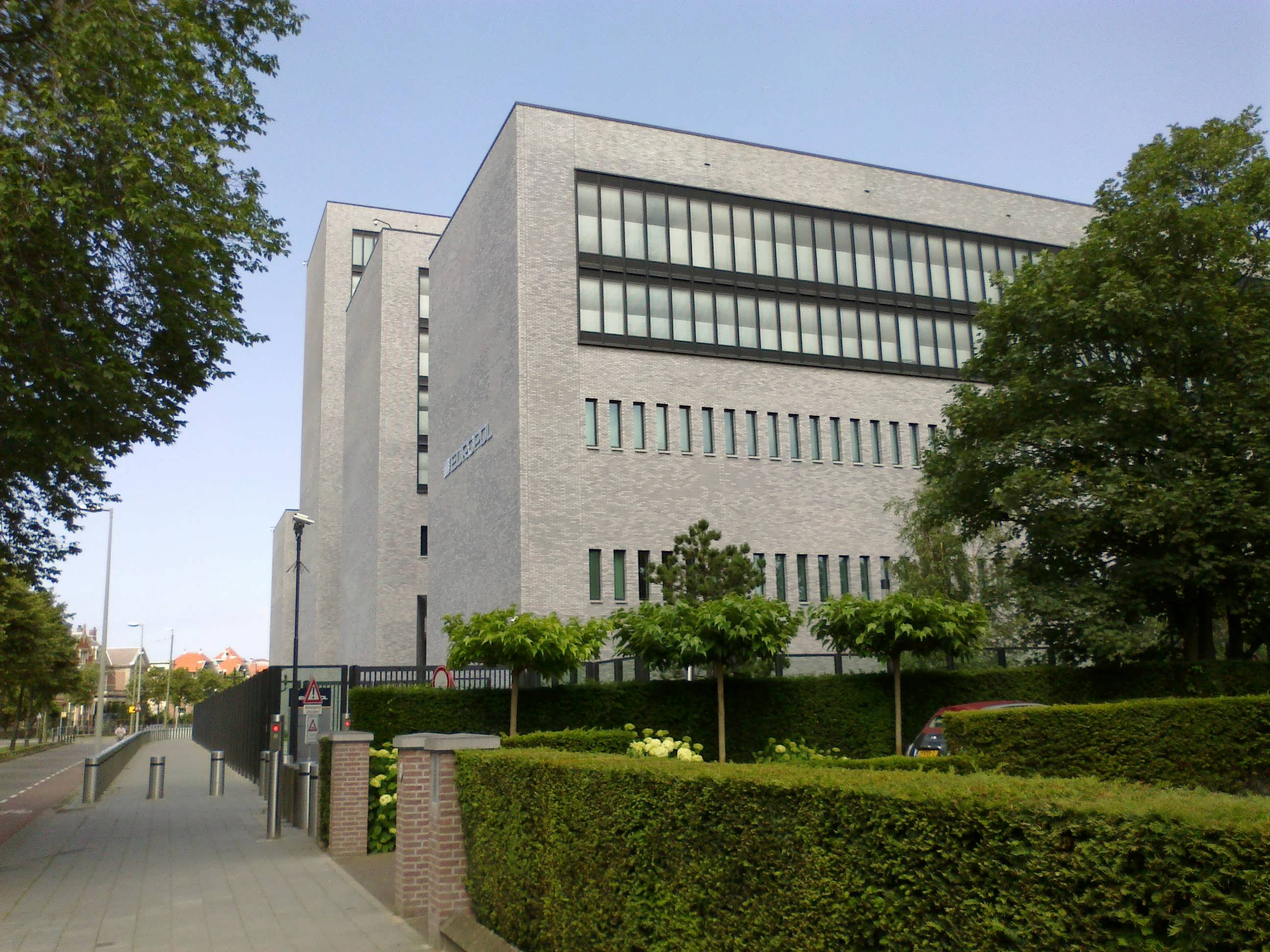
- The Hague; Eisenhowerlaan; Statenkwartier; 2014;
- Operation name: Operation First Light 2024
- Type: Internet Scammers

Roster
- Executed by: United States, Europol, Eurojust, United Kingdom
- No. of countries participating: 61

Timeline
- Date executed: May to June 2024

Results
- Arrests: 3,950

Operation First Light 2024 was an international law enforcement operation targeting online scammers. Scams that were taken down included phishing, romance scams, investment scams, fake shopping websites, and other internet fraud. The operation is believed to have identified 14,643 other suspects.

== Background ==
Operation First Light is a global law enforcement operation between 61 countries and European Union Intelligence Agency Europol. The operation was part of the international strategies to address the problems of online scams. Agency's that took part in this global effort were AFRIPOL, ASEANAPOL, GCCPOL, and Europol. China's Ministry of Public Security, Singapore Police Force's Anti-Scam Center, Hong Kong, China Police Force's Anti-Deception Coordination Center.

To help recovery and trace the funds INTERPOLS Global Rapid Intervention of Payments (I-GRIP) mechanism was used.

== Raids ==
Law enforcement in 61 countries arrested 3,900 suspect and seized $257 million in illegal assets. During the raids police froze 6,745 bank accounts, real estate, vehicles, and jewelry.

In the raid in Australia police were able to recover over $3.7 million in an impersonation scam money that had been transfer to bank accounts in Hong Kong & Malaysia.

In the raids in Namibia the operation rescued over 88 children who were being forced to conduct the scams.
