= Famous Impostors =

1910 book by Bram Stoker

- First British edition (Sidgwick & Jackson, printed in the US)
- Author: Bram Stoker
- Language: English
- Genre: Non-fiction
- Publisher: Sturgis & Walton (US)
- Publication date: November 1910
- Publication place: United States, United Kingdom
- Media type: Print (hardcover)

Famous Impostors is the last of four non-fiction books completed by Bram Stoker, published in 1910. It features numerous historical impostors and hoaxes. The work was released thirteen years after Dracula.

The first edition was published by the Sturgis & Walton Company of New York in November 1910. The British edition was published by Sidgwick & Jackson of London, also dated 1910, but printed in the United States. Newspaper and magazine coverage showed that it was published in January 1911.

== Contents ==
- Pretenders
  - Perkin Warbeck — A Flemish man who claimed to be Richard of Shrewsbury, Duke of York, one of the disappeared Princes in the Tower.
  - The Hidden King — Four men who claimed to be the deceased Sebastian, King of Portugal.
  - Stephan Mali (Šćepan Mali) — The only Tsar of Montenegro, who took power because of a rumour that he was the deposed Peter III of Russia.
  - The False Dauphins — A slew of men claiming to have been the executed Louis XVII.
  - Olivia Serres — A painter and author who claimed to be the natural daughter of Prince Henry, Duke of Cumberland and Strathearn as "Princess Olive of Cumberland."
- Practitioners of Magic
  - Paracelsus — A Swiss polymath held as the "father of toxicology."
  - Alessandro Cagliostro — An Italian occultist and con artist.
  - Franz Mesmer — A proponent of the pseudoscience theory of "animal magnetism."
- The Wandering Jew
- John Law — A Scottish-French economist whose eponymous system for France's finances was an early experiment in fiat money.
- Witchcraft and Clairvoyance
  - Witches
  - Doctor Dee — An English scientist and occultist who served Elizabeth I as court astronomer.
  - La Voisin — A French fortune teller accused of witchcraft.
  - Sir Edward Kelley — An English occultist and alchemist, partner of John Dee.
  - Mother Damnable — a brewer and owner of today's The World's End, Camden. Suspected witch after her death.
  - Matthew Hopkins — the "Witchfinder General"
- Arthur Orton — An Englishman who is the most widely supported candidate for the Tichborne claimant's identity.
- Women as Men
  - The Motive for Disguise
  - Hannah Snell — A British soldier for five years in disguise as a man.
  - La Maupin — A French opera singer called "the new Sappho."
  - Mary East (James How) — An English tavern proprietor who lived as a married man for 32 years until subject to legal action.
- Hoaxes, Etc.
  - Two London Hoaxes — includes the Berners Street hoax
  - The Cat Hoax — a scam to buy cats brought to a certain address
  - The Military Review — a false parade announced at 1812
  - The Toll-Gate — a practical joke played by Charles Mayne Young for not paying a toll
  - The Marriage Hoax — a marriage stopped by the false claim that the groom already had a wife and children
  - Buried Treasure — a false treasure unearthed by a victim and a swindler, which gives his share to the victim in exchange for something of value
  - Dean Swift's Hoax — an alleged letter written by a criminal about his accomplices and hideouts
  - Hoaxed Burglars — thieves steal a secure box containing lead
  - Bogus Sausages — sausages are discovered to be skins filled with bread
  - The Moon Hoax — A series of newspapers claiming life had been discovered on Earth's moon.
- Chevalière d'Éon — A French diplomat, spy and soldier of ambiguous gender identity.
- The Bisley Boy — A claim that Queen Elizabeth I was secretly a man.
