= Waldemar A. Nielsen =

American sociologist (1917–2005)

Waldemar A. Nielsen (March 27, 1917 – November 2, 2005) was an American author and an expert on philanthropy and philanthropic organizations.

== Biography ==
He is best known for writing the 1972 book The Big Foundations which looked into the finances and operations of American philanthropic foundations with assets above $100 million.

In 1985, he wrote The Golden Donors, which, like The Big Foundations, concluded that philanthropic organizations were too cautious and few were delivering on their promise.

Georgetown University hosts a lecture series named after Nielsen, the Waldemar A. Nielsen Issue Forums in Philanthropy, which hosts speakers discussing research into philanthropy.

== See also ==
- U.S. President's Committee on Information Activities Abroad
