= Edward P. Lilly =

American historian

- Lilly in 1937
- Born: October 13, 1910; Brooklyn, New York, U.S.
- Died: December 1, 1994 (aged 84); Silver Spring, Maryland, U.S.
- Education: College of the Holy Cross (BA); Catholic University of America (MA, PhD)
- Occupation: Historian
- Years active: 1933–1977

Edward Paul Lilly (October 13, 1910 – December 1, 1994) was an American historian, author, and educator who specialized in the history of political and psychological warfare in the twentieth century.

== Life and career ==
Lilly was born on October 13, 1910, in Brooklyn, New York. He attended the College of the Holy Cross in Worcester, Massachusetts, where he received an A.B. in philosophy in 1932. He then attended the Catholic University of America in Washington, D.C., where he received his M.A. in history in 1933 and his Ph.D. in the same discipline in 1936. His doctoral dissertation, "The Colonial Agents of New York and New Jersey," was an expansion of his master's thesis and published as a book by the Catholic University of America Press a year later. His dissertation was supervised by Dr. Leo F. Stock of the Carnegie Institution, who also taught for many years at Catholic University.

Lilly began his teaching career as an instructor at Loyola University Chicago from 1936 to 1939, followed by post-doctoral research at Yale University, and then a Penfield Fellowship from Catholic University which enabled him to continue his research in Great Britain. Further research abroad was interrupted by the outbreak of World War II, so he returned to Yale and received a Sterling Fellowship. He joined Catholic University's history department in 1940 as an assistant professor, where he was the advisor for numerous master's theses during the 1940s. During the war, a department of the Army Specialized Training Program was set up at Catholic University, and Lilly became its director.

Although technically still a faculty member, Lilly moved into government service in 1944 when he took a leave of absence from Catholic University to become a special assistant to Elmer Davis, the Director of the Office of War Information, serving as OWI's historian. In 1946, he transferred to the staff of the Joint Chiefs of Staff, where he served as a special consultant on psychological warfare. He continued to teach part-time at Catholic University from 1946 to 1952, but also lectured on psychological warfare at Georgetown University, the Army War College, the Naval Intelligence School, and at NATO headquarters in Norfolk, Virginia. During this time, Lilly wrote two unpublished (and classified) studies on American psychological warfare that were used for background briefings.

Lilly officially left Catholic University and joined the staff of the U.S. National Security Council in 1952, where he worked at first as a planning officer for the Psychological Strategy Board from 1952 to 1953, and then deputy executive assistant in the Operations Coordinating Board from 1953 to 1961, then remaining on the NSC staff until 1965. One of his duties on the OCB was overseeing the U.S. Ideological Program, where books were selected for Information Centers and translation programs based on whether they would serve ideological purposes.

After leaving government work in 1965, Lilly joined the faculty at St. John's University, where he was an associate professor of history from 1966 to 1969. He then moved back to Washington and joined the faculty of the Washington Technical Institute in 1970. (The school became part of the University of the District of Columbia in 1976.) While there, Lilly helped to organize a local chapter of the American Federation of Teachers and became its president. He retired in 1977.

Lilly married Nancy M. Jones in 1936, and they had ten children. He fought to help preserve Bethany Beach, Delaware, where he owned a cottage, from exploitation by unscrupulous developers. Lilly suffered from Alzheimer's disease in his later years. Lilly's papers were donated by his family to the Dwight D. Eisenhower Presidential Library, Museum and Boyhood Home in Abilene, Kansas.

== Scholarship ==
Lilly's career as a historian of colonial America was permanently interrupted by his government work and interest in psychological warfare. He published one article ("A Major Problem for Catholic American Historians") in the Catholic Historical Review (Jan. 1939), and ten book reviews in the Catholic Historical Review and the Mississippi Valley Historical Review, all of which were in the first decade of his academic career, prior to beginning his government work. While working for the Office of War Information, he proposed to Director Elmer Davis that a history of OWI be prepared - and Lilly wrote 800 pages of a draft history of the agency before the OWI (along with many other wartime agencies) was terminated in late 1945. During his time at the Joint Chiefs of Staff, Lilly wrote a 1,400 page study of United States psychological warfare during World War II. He later attempted at various times without success to publish it in unclassified form. In December 1951, Lilly also wrote "The Development of American Psychological Operations 1945–1951," which has since been unclassified. Lilly contributed a chapter, "The Psychological Strategy Board and its Predecessors: Foreign Policy Coordination 1938–1953," in Gaetano L. Vincitorio (ed.), Studies in Modern History (St. John's University Press, 1968), 337–382. He was an active member of the American Historical Association and the American Catholic Historical Association.

== Bibliography ==
- Directory of American Scholars, 6th ed. (Bowker, 1974), Vol. I, p. 378.
- "Guide to the Edward P. Lilly Papers, 1928–1992," Dwight D. Eisenhower Library, Abilene, Kansas.
- Johnson, Neil M. "Oral History Interview with Edward D. Lilly" (sic.), Harry S. Truman Library & Museum, September 20, 1988.
- Langley, Harold D. "Edward P. Lilly." Perspectives, Vol. 33 (Nov. 1995): 30–31.
- Lilly, Edward P. "The Development of American Psychological Operations 1945–1951." Report prepared for the Psychological Strategy Board, Washington, DC, 1951.
- Manning, Martin J. "Lilly, Edward Paul." In Historical Dictionary of American Propaganda, by Martin J. Manning (Greenwood Press, 2004), 172.
