= Joe Wiegand =

American Theodore Roosevelt reprisor and former political consultant (born 1965)

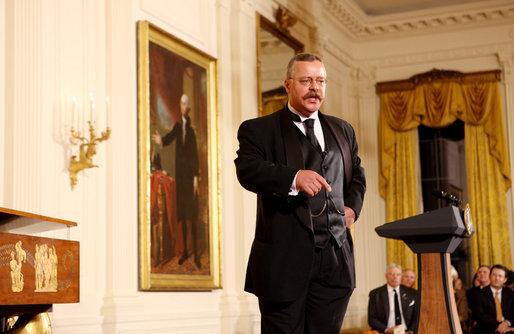
- Wiegand portraying Theodore Roosevelt at the White House on Roosevelt's 150th birthday in 2008
- Born: April 15, 1965 (age 61); Chicago, Illinois, U.S.
- Education: University of the South
- Occupations: Theodore Roosevelt reprisor Political consultant

Joe Wiegand (born April 15, 1965) is an American historical interpreter and former political consultant best known for portraying U.S. President Theodore Roosevelt. He has performed as Roosevelt in all 50 U.S. states, internationally, and at the White House. His Roosevelt performances are endorsed by the Theodore Roosevelt Association (TRA).

== Education and political career ==
Wiegand studied political science at the University of the South in Sewanee, Tennessee. In 1985, while a student at Sewanee, he was selected as a Harry S. Truman Scholar. He was also a Thomas J. Watson Fellow.

Wiegand later worked in Illinois politics and public policy. He served as a graduate assistant at the Center for Governmental Studies at Northern Illinois University before working as a political campaign consultant and public policy analyst. He was elected to the DeKalb County Board.

== Theodore Roosevelt portrayal ==
Wiegand began portraying Roosevelt in 2002 while still working in public policy and political campaigns. In 2008, during the 150th anniversary year of Roosevelt's birth, Wiegand and his family traveled throughout the United States. On October 27, 2008, he performed at the White House during a celebration hosted by President George W. Bush and First Lady Laura Bush.

Wiegand has subsequently portrayed Roosevelt at historical sites, museums, schools, and public events throughout the United States. In 2012 he served as the model for a sculpture of Roosevelt commissioned by the American Museum of Natural History in New York City.

== Medora, North Dakota ==
Wiegand began performing in Medora, North Dakota, in 2012 and works for the Theodore Roosevelt Medora Foundation. His activities there have included The Teddy Roosevelt Show, appearances associated with the Medora Musical, and other Roosevelt-related programming.

Wiegand also hosts and participates in the Badlands Chautauqua: A Gathering of TRs in Medora, which brings together multiple Theodore Roosevelt reprisors and other historical interpreters.

Wiegand participated in the inaugural events surrounding the July 2026 opening of the Theodore Roosevelt Presidential Library in Medora. He appeared at the library's July 4 public opening ceremony.

== Theodore Roosevelt Association ==
Wiegand is a member of the Theodore Roosevelt Association, which endorses his performances as Roosevelt. He serves on the association's Advisory Board, Class of 2028.

In October 2026 Wiegand is scheduled to participate in the Theodore Roosevelt Convention, or "TeddyCon", at the Theodore Roosevelt Presidential Library in Medora. He is scheduled to host a Theodore Roosevelt trivia session and moderate a panel titled "The Badlands: Past, Present, and Future".

== Digital portrayal ==
In 2025 the Theodore Roosevelt Inaugural National Historic Site in Buffalo, New York, introduced an interactive artificial-intelligence portrayal of Roosevelt based visually and vocally on Wiegand. Wiegand was recorded in front of a green screen, with his appearance, speech patterns, and mannerisms incorporated into an interactive Roosevelt avatar that responds to visitors' questions.
