= Celebrity impersonation scams on social media =

Online fraud

Celebrity impersonation scams via social media are forms of fraud that occur when an individual or group fraudulently represents themselves as well-known celebrity or public figure to obtain money, personal data, or other benefits. Scammers use manipulated photographs, misleading messages, or realistic deepfake videos and voices to support their schemes, which can make it difficult to distinguish them from a real celebrity’s image or voice. Media reports and consumer advocacy agencies have reported that such scams have become increasingly prevalent and sophisticated, alongside the expansion of social media platforms and emerging technologies such as AI-generated media.

== Definition and techniques ==
Fraudsters often establish fake social media accounts purporting to belong to an actor, musician, athlete, or other public figure. Later, they reach out privately to the followers or possible victims, to request money, personal information, or some sort of benefits. They often use social media schemes that could include fake endorsements opportunities, false charity appeals, "romance" stories, investment platforms, or promises of prizes and giveaways, all falsely presented as being supported by a popular celebrity. The emergence of deepfake technology and AI has been identified as a significant development in the evolution of such scams.

Scammers have increasingly incorporated different types of AI tools. These tools are used to scan social media platforms and build profiles of potential victims. They may also produce realistic video or audio recordings of the impersonated celebrity and communicate with targeted victims to establish the groundwork for the scamming schemes. Many scammers create what they call “Persona Kits”, which may contain all the necessary digital tools to create an effective false identity for a celebrity impersonator. The kit can contain, but is not limited to, the voice of the celebrity, AI-generated photos showing the celebrity in different places and backgrounds, and a fake background history of the celebrity being impersonated. This approach allows a single individual or a small group to operate and maintain numerous impersonator profiles simultaneously.

Even though deepfake technology is becoming more prevalent, victims are still victimized by traditional forms of social engineering (e.g., claims of a “real” crisis) and/or by offers of “results” that appear to be “too good to be true.” Consumer advocacy organizations have pointed out that while the content used by scammers may change, the underlying elements of these scams remain consistent. The most common elements include unsolicited contact with potential victims, implied urgency, offering unusually high returns on investments, and requesting payments through unconventional methods such as cryptocurrency. Scammers also employ additional deceptive practices, including offering fictitious meet-and-greet experiences or selling counterfeit celebrity merchandise that is either poor quality or never delivered. The FBI has warned that AI is capable of reducing spelling errors and unnatural phrasing that once served as indicators of scam messages, increasing the believability of impersonation attempts.

== Global prevalence ==
The number of individuals victimized in the U.S. through various types of fraud has increased significantly since 2020. In 2023, over 64,000 people in the U.S. lost more than $1 billion to romance scams, which include many cases involving scammers claiming to be celebrities. In Europe, there have been several highly publicized examples of celebrity impersonation scams. In France, law enforcement reported a case in which a scammer posing as a well-known actor defrauded a victim of several hundred thousand euros. In the UK, celebrity scams increased during the COVID-19 pandemic. The term “Digital Mafia” was used by a BBC investigation in 2025 and defined as an organized group that impersonates A-list celebrities using fake profiles on social media to scam victims.

In Russia, official government statistics reported more than 680,000 crimes involving digital technology in 2023, representing a 30% increase compared to 2022. Experts report that the annual damage from the unlawful use of celebrity brands in online fraud exceeds 500 million rubles (approximately 6.5–7 million USD).

In India, numerous Bollywood stars sought court protection in 2025 from the unauthorized use of their likeness in fake video form, as well as from other fraudulent schemes. Surveys show that 75% of Indian internet users have viewed deepfake content, which impersonate prominent public figures. In Australia, false celebrity endorsements have been used to promote investment scams, with losses reported in the millions of dollars. In 2024, the Australian Competition and Consumer Commission warned that deepfake videos of public figures were being used as bait for fraudulent trading platforms.

In South America, Brazilian authorities reported dismantling a scheme in 2025 that used deepfake advertisements featuring celebrities to deceive consumers. The investigation led to arrests and contributed to a ruling by Brazil’s Supreme Court that imposed greater responsibility on social media platforms for failing to remove criminal advertisements.

== History ==
Impersonation scams have existed for many years; however, social media expanded their reach and reduced barriers to contacting large numbers of potential victims. In the late 2000s, they started using major social media platforms to create fake profiles for well-known celebrities. The U.S. Federal Trade Commission reported increased activity in 2018 based on fake celebrity accounts on social media, often claiming that victims had won prizes, needed to donate to charities, or would be given help of some kind. In response, social media companies began to implement systems to verify identities and put policies in place to help prevent impersonation scams, though changes to these systems later had unintended consequences. Despite these measures, scammers found ways to avoid being caught; by making slight changes to their names, usernames, or profile images.

Impersonation scams also experienced an increase during the COVID-19 pandemic due to a high level of online activity and increased isolation from potential victims. At the same time, advances in deepfake technology and AI-driven content creation significantly altered how these scams were carried out and made it easier for scammers to create realistic content.

Reports published between 2024 and 2025 showed a substantial increase in the use of AI-generated media to impersonate celebrities. Consumer protection agencies such as the FTC and Better Business Bureau indicated growth in celebrity-related scams and issued public alerts warning consumers about deepfake videos and unsolicited messages involving well-known celebrities.

== Notable scam incidents ==
Elon Musk investment scams: Several industry reports have identified Elon Musk as one of the most frequently impersonated figures in deepfake-based scams. In Texas, a 62-year-old healthcare worker spent more than $10,000 after seeing an advertisement for a cryptocurrency on Facebook and TikTok that included a deepfaked video of Musk. In Australia, another victim lost approximately A$80,000 by using what they thought was an interview of Musk promoting an automated trading platform. The victim was then shown a fake investment dashboard showing profits; however, they could never get their money back.

Brad Pitt romance scam: A woman in France lost about €830,000 (approximately $850,000) after scammers impersonating Brad Pitt convinced her she was in a romantic relationship with the actor. The fraudsters used fake social media and WhatsApp accounts and AI-generated images, and claimed Pitt needed money for medical treatment while his bank accounts were frozen due to divorce proceedings, leading the victim to send large payments.

Keanu Reeves romance scam: A Florida woman named Dianne Ringstaff lost over $160,000 to scammers posing as actor Keanu Reeves. The person first contacted her through the mobile game Words With Friends. When she doubted the claim, the individual video-chatted with her and appeared to look like Reeves, and also sent audio messages that sounded like the actor. Over about two and a half years, the impersonator told stories about lawsuits and frozen assets and asked her to send money in Bitcoin and cryptocurrency.

Oprah Winfrey product scams: The Better Business Bureau reported that many consumers encountered scams involving weight-loss products falsely promoted using the likeness of Oprah Winfrey. According to BBB Scam Tracker reports, consumers saw social media ads that appeared to show Oprah endorsing products such as weight-loss supplements, but these endorsements were fake and part of scams using manipulated or AI-generated media.

Gisele Bündchen product scams: In 2025, Brazilian authorities arrested four suspects connected to a scam that used Instagram ads featuring deepfake videos of supermodel Gisele Bündchen and other celebrities. Investigators identified more than 20 million reais in suspicious funds linked to the scheme.

Kim Kardashian charity scams: The Better Business Bureau reported that consumers received emails appearing to be from Kim Kardashian asking them to send money to help victims of the California wildfires. The messages were part of scams in which fraudsters impersonate celebrities to gain victims’ trust and request money.

Mariah Carey concert booking scam: In 2015 and 2016, two individuals posing as representatives of Mariah Carey defrauded two LGBTQ charities of approximately $130,000 by falsely offering to arrange benefit concert performances by the singer. According to the United States Department of Justice, the scheme involved fabricated contracts, travel arrangements for charity organizers to attend Carey’s concerts, altered complimentary tickets, and fraudulent email accounts impersonating Carey’s tour manager.

Tom Cruise impersonation prosecutions: In 2023, Nigeria’s Economic and Financial Crimes Commission (EFCC) secured convictions against several individuals involved in internet fraud, including a man who impersonated Tom Cruise on Instagram and defrauded a victim in Norway of $80 before being convicted in a Federal Capital Territory High Court.

Taylor Swift deepfake ads: In 2024, social media advertisements generated with artificial intelligence used Taylor Swift’s likeness and voice to promote a fraudulent giveaway of Le Creuset cookware. The ads claimed that a packaging error meant thousands of cookware sets were being given away and directed users to click a link and complete a survey. Le Creuset stated that it had no partnership with Swift and that the promotion was a scam.

Bill Gates livestream scams: In 2020, videos featuring the likeness of Bill Gates appeared on several hijacked YouTube channels that had been renamed to resemble official Microsoft accounts. The livestreams promoted a fraudulent cryptocurrency “giveaway” and claimed to be associated with verified accounts. YouTube removed the streams after they were reported, while Microsoft stated that its verified accounts had not been compromised.

Andrey Melnichenko social media impersonation: Fraudulent social media accounts operating from several countries have impersonated Soviet-born industrialist Andrey Melnichenko on Twitter and Instagram, using his name, photographs, and other material obtained from publicly available sources. Melnichenko has stated that he does not maintain a presence on social media and does not operate any active personal accounts on such platforms.

Reese Witherspoon impersonation scams: In 2025, investigators from the BBC program Scam Interceptors encountered multiple social media accounts impersonating actress Reese Witherspoon while investigating celebrity scams in an online fan group. One impersonator spent several weeks communicating with the investigators, sent manipulated images and deepfake videos that appeared and sounded like Witherspoon, and later introduced a person posing as her manager as part of an attempt to obtain money. In January 2026, Witherspoon publicly warned that scammers were impersonating her on TikTok and Instagram, contacting fans through direct messages to build relationships, obtain personal information, arrange meetings, or seek money.

Richard Branson investment scams: In 2018, advertisements on Facebook promoted various financial schemes using the image of Richard Branson without his authorization. Branson stated that he was increasing efforts to combat cryptocurrency scams and had spoken with executives at Meta Platforms about misleading promotional advertisements appearing on the platform.

Gordon Ramsay cookware scams: The Better Business Bureau reported scams in which fraudsters impersonated celebrity chef Gordon Ramsay in online promotions offering free cookware. The advertisements directed users to counterfeit websites where they were asked to provide payment information to cover purported shipping costs. BBB Scam Tracker reports also documented fake Gordon Ramsay–branded HexClad cookware giveaways in which consumers paid small shipping or entry fees and subsequently reported additional or recurring charges.

== Legal and platform responses ==
Legal responses to celebrity impersonation scams have expanded as authorities address both traditional fraud and AI-enabled deception. In several jurisdictions, lawmakers rely on existing fraud and identity theft statutes, while also proposing new legislation to address malicious uses of deepfake technology. Regulatory agencies have emphasized that scams conducted through AI-generated media remain subject to the same penalties as all other forms of fraud.

In 2025, India’s courts issued injunctions to several actors to protect “personality rights” in relation to the unauthorized use of their images in AI-generated content. China introduced regulations requiring AI-generated media to be clearly labeled, with penalties for noncompliance. The European Union is proposing provisions addressing manipulated media as part of larger legislative packages, including the AI Act and Digital Services Act. In 2024, the Russian parliament proposed new amendments to the Criminal Code to penalize the misuse of deepfakes, and the Central Bank of Russia has made public announcements warning consumers about the dangers of scams created with AI-generated video and audio impersonations.

Social media platform responses

Major social media platforms prohibit impersonation and maintain policies requiring the removal of fake celebrity accounts when reported, though enforcement varies due to scale. Platforms have introduced identity verification systems, such as verification badges, although changes to these systems have at times resulted in increased impersonation. Internal documents cited by Reuters described how Meta adjusted its handling of scam advertisements in response to regulatory pressure.

== See also ==
- Deepfake
- Romance scam
- Scam
