= Psychological Strategy Board =

The Psychological Strategy Board (PSB) was a committee of the United States executive formed to coordinate and plan for psychological operations. It was formed on April 4, 1951, during the Truman administration. The board was composed of the under secretary of state, the deputy secretary of defense, and the director of central intelligence, or their designated representatives. The board's first director was Gordon Gray, later the national security advisor during the Eisenhower administration. The board was created in response to the growth of Office of Policy Coordination covert activities during the Korean War.

Under Eisenhower, the board became a purely coordinating body. The board's function was reviewed by the Jackson Committee, chaired by William Harding Jackson, set up to propose future United States Government information and psychological warfare programs. The committee concluded that the board had been established on the assumption that psychological strategy could be conducted separately from official policy and actions, an assumption the committee disagreed with. It was abolished September 3, 1953 by Executive Order 10483, with its responsibilities being transferred to the Operations Coordinating Board.

== National Psychological Strategy Board ==
In August 1950, the Department of State created the National Psychological Strategy Board (NPSB), attempting to centralize psychological warfare activities under its control. That resulted in a conflict with the Department of Defense which called for an interdepartmental committee instead. President Truman broke the logjam on January 4, 1951, when he ordered Frederick Lawton and Sidney Souers to develop a plan for what would become PSB – an interdepartmental committee.

== Purpose ==
After World War II, the atmosphere altered: wars could not be won through bloodshed but by winning the hearts and minds of people. Consequently, the Truman administration changed their foreign policy from traditional warfare to psychological warfare.

The American government perceived Soviet actions as a threat to democracy. This was evident from the South Korean invasion by North Korea. The Psychological Strategy Board (PSB) was set up to produce propaganda that would win the opinion of people around the world and prevent the spread of Communism. According to a report by the State Department, "convincing a foreign official is less important than carrying an issue over his head to his people" as the people will have a greater influence on the official's action. As a result, the PSB was formed to create propaganda which subconsciously turned people towards democracy.

While working for the Joint Chiefs of Staff, historian Edward P. Lilly wrote a 1,400 page study of United States psychological warfare during World War II, which is available among Lilly's papers at the Eisenhower Library in Abilene, Kansas; Lilly also wrote a book chapter on the PSB.

== Types of propaganda ==
The PSB defined psychological warfare as any nonmilitary action which influenced public opinion or foreign policy interest. This includes trade and economic aid, cultural and educational exchange, threats to use force and diplomacy.

Diplomats and politicians used carefully selected words and phrases, often referred to as buzzwords, to shape policies and influence domestic and international opinion. The most popular buzzword was 'containment' because it allowed U.S. officials to present their foreign policy objectives as "noble, restrained and fundamentally defensive".

Initially, the Soviet Union used buzzwords to promote their "hate America" campaign which was launched on January 21, 1951. The campaign emphasized the corruption of big businesses in America and accused them of attempting to dominate the world. The Soviets, on the other hand, were portrayed as champions who were trying to overthrow the capitalists, such as America. Many people in the international community believed the Soviet propaganda. The U.S. adopted the Soviet strategy to win the hearts and minds of people.

Radio programs were transmitted to countries behind the iron curtain, such as Hungary, Poland and Czechoslovakia, because the USSR could not block this form of propaganda as they could not stop radio waves. Some radio series, such as Voice of America (VOA), were aired in Latin America as well.

The programs were designed to accentuate America's successes and portrayed the U.S. as a superior nation. Each satellite country had a different program aimed towards them which focused on the issues that would attract the people towards capitalist democracy.
