= W. Thomas Smith Jr. =

American author, editor, and journalist

W. Thomas Smith Jr. (born April 30, 1959) is an American author, editor, and journalist. He has written several books. His articles have appeared in many newspapers and magazines. Smith is executive editor of World Defense Review, a columnist with Townhall.com, and a former contributor to National Review Online.

== Education and military service ==
Smith graduated from the University of South Carolina Columbia in 1982 with a BA degree in history. He then served in the U.S. Marine Corps as an infantry leader, parachutist, and shipboard special weapons security and counterterrorism instructor. Following his service in the Corps in 1987, he served on a para-military SWAT team in the nuclear industry. Soon thereafter, he began his career as a journalist.

== Career ==
Smith has written for numerous publications, including USA Today, U.S. News & World Report, BusinessWeek, The New York Post, and the UK's The Guardian. In 1998, he co-authored a George magazine feature with John F. Kennedy Jr. (Smith interviewed Gen. William C. Westmoreland in Charleston, South Carolina – Kennedy interviewed Gen. Võ Nguyên Giáp in Vietnam). The interviews were published together as a single piece on the Vietnam War in the November 1998 issue of George.

As a war correspondent, Smith reported from battlefields in both the Balkans in 1995 and in the Middle East in 1997, and he covered the immediate aftermath of the September 11, 2001 attacks from ground zero in New York. Also during the 1990s, he worked as a business magazine editor, a contract media relations director, a publicist for NBA basketball player Vince Carter and other professional athletes, and was the sole columnist for head football coach Lou Holtz's official website during Holtz's inaugural season at USC.

Smith's first book, Encyclopedia of the Central Intelligence Agency, was published in 2003. He has since written five other books.

Smith has been a guest commentator on the Fox News Channel, E! Entertainment's True Hollywood Story, and Bill Bennett's Morning in America. He has also been interviewed by numerous national publications (including Woman's Day, Writer's Digest, The Writer, and others); NBC, CBS, and ABC television affiliates; and he is a frequent guest on nationally syndicated radio programs, National Public Radio (NPR), and international radio, including the BBC. His articles have been included numerous times in radio-host Rush Limbaugh's daily "stack of stuff."

Smith is a contributing writer for A Nation Changed, a book commemorating the first anniversary of the 9/11 terrorist attacks (published by U.S. News & World Report). He is the technical editor and foreword writer for the second edition of The Complete Idiot's Guide to Understanding Iraq by Joseph Tragert, and he is the technical editor and "special afterword" writer for Contract Warriors by Fred Rosen.

He has served as adjunct professor at USC's College of Journalism and Mass Communications, and he has lectured groups and conferences from Fortune 500 companies to the U.S. Armed Forces.

A former correspondent for 'Agencia EFE' (the world's largest Spanish-language news wire), Smith currently writes a column, 'Beyond the DropZone', for – and is executive editor of – World Defense Review. He is a columnist for Townhall.com, and an erstwhile contributor to National Review Online. Some of his stories have been picked up by the Scripps Howard News wire. Others have been re-published by the U.S. Department of Defense. He also writes for Family Security Matters and is the director of their Counterterrorism Research Center.

== Beirut controversy ==
In November 2007, Smith became the subject of controversy for blog posts he wrote as a freelancer for "The Tank", a section of National Review Online (NRO). On September 25, 2007, Smith reported that some 200-plus heavily armed Hezbollah militiamen were occupying a sprawling Hezbollah tent city close to the Lebanese parliament. Four days later, he blogged that between 4,000 and 5,000 Hezbollah gunmen deployed to the Christian areas of Beirut in an unsettling show of force.

The Huffington Post published a story alleging that Smith exaggerated or made up two events. In response, Smith said he had only failed to be "specific in terms of detailing his sourcing."

After an internal NRO investigation, Smith's editors declared that NRO could not stand by the blogging because both reports were disputed as implausible by sources independent of Smith. On December 7, 2007, Smith voluntarily ended his relationship as a freelancer with NRO, saying this would be "in the best interest of the publication."

== Books ==
- Encyclopedia of the Central Intelligence Agency – NY, Facts on File, 2003 – ISBN 0-8160-4667-0
- Alpha Bravo Delta Guide to Decisive 20th-Century American Battles (foreword by Brigadier General David L. Grange) – NY, Alpha-Penguin, 2003 – ISBN 1-59257-147-6
- Alpha Bravo Delta Guide to American Airborne Forces (foreword by Colonel Jeffery Bearor) – NY, Alpha-Penguin, 2004 – ISBN 1-59257-166-2
- Alpha Bravo Delta Guide to the Korean Conflict (foreword by Dr. C. Kenneth Quinones) – NY, Alpha-Penguin, 2004 – ISBN 1-59257-213-8
- The Complete Idiot's Guide to Pirates (co-authored with Gail Selinger) – NY, Alpha-Penguin, 2006
- The Complete Idiot's Guide to Understanding Intelligent Design (co-authored with Christopher Carlisle) – Alpha Books, 2006 – ISBN 978-1-59257-555-8
