= Encyclopedia of the Central Intelligence Agency =

2003 encyclopedia by W. Thomas Smith Jr

- Encyclopedia of the Central Intelligence Agency
- Author: W. Thomas Smith Jr.
- Language: English
- Series: Facts on File Library of American History
- Subject: Central Intelligence Agency
- Genre: Encyclopedia
- Published: 2003
- Publisher: Infobase
- Publication place: United States
- Media type: Hardcover
- Pages: 282
- ISBN: 978-0-8160-4666-9

Encyclopedia of the Central Intelligence Agency is a 2003 book by W. Thomas Smith Jr. It is an encyclopedic work on the Central Intelligence Agency (CIA), the only independent agency of the United States federal government that is tasked with intelligence-gathering. The work chronicles the history of the agency from its founding in 1947 through the war on terror, which began after the September 11 attacks. The encyclopedia's chronology ends in 2003. It provides approximately 550 entries across 282 pages on topics including notable contributors, intelligence operations, historical events, and depictions of the CIA in fictional media.

The encyclopedia was praised by the School Library Journal for its reference value and comprehensiveness. Booklist recommended the encyclopedia be placed in academic, public, and high school libraries as a helpful resource. Publishers Weekly was critical of the author's objectivity, suggesting that the encyclopedia was biased in favor of the agency's intelligence operations, but concluded that the book was still a useful reference tool.

== Background ==
Encyclopedia of the Central Intelligence Agency is written by W. Thomas Smith Jr. Prior to authoring the work, he served in the United States Marine Corps as a paratrooper and leader within the infantry. Smith worked as a journalist for the Star-Reporter in Columbia, South Carolina, and subsequently taught journalism at the University of South Carolina.

Smith gave an interview to the Columbia newspaper The State about his book and his interest in researching the history of the Central Intelligence Agency. He explained that he was long interested in researching military history, and was initially asked by the American Society of Journalists and Authors to put together a monograph on the 1944 Invasion of Normandy by Western Allied forces during Operation Overlord in World War II. His literary representative later called him to ask if he would instead be interested in writing an encyclopedia detailing the history of the CIA. Smith agreed as he felt the CIA was highly relevant to military history.

== Publication history ==
Encyclopedia of the Central Intelligence Agency was first published in 2003 by Facts on File. It was released in both hardcover and paperback formats. An eBook edition was published the same year. Additionally an eBook was also published in 2003 in the UK.

== Contents summary ==
In the Encyclopedia of the Central Intelligence Agency, Smith discusses and defines key concepts relating to intelligence gathering, including "clandestine mentality", a colloquial term used to characterize what may be called a more paranoid perspective of the world. The book is 282 pages in length, and contains more than 500 separate entries on topics such as the roles played by key contributors to the agency, notable historical events, major intelligence operations, and depictions of the organization in fictional media. The work cites approximately 300 reference sources.

Starting with the founding of the CIA in 1947 as the successor to the Office of Strategic Services, the author provides the reader with a chronological overview of the agency's history. He documents the CIA's involvement in the 1953 Iranian coup d'état, and provides a biographical assessment of the motivations of Mohammad Mosaddegh, the Iranian leader deposed in the coup. In briefly describing individuals, organizations and events related to the history of the CIA, Smith notes Russian intelligence Colonel Vilyam Genrikhovich Fisher (Rudolf Ivanovich Abel), and discusses the U.S. intelligence operation that used a front company called Zenith Technical Enterprises. The chronological presentation of CIA history is used to provide additional background with regard to the agency's involvement with the war on terror. The encyclopedia's chronology ends in March 2003.

== Reception ==
In a review by School Library Journal, Smith's encyclopedia was praised for its reference value. The review called the encyclopedia comprehensive, and noted it contained helpful appendices including a glossary, lists of executive staff members of the CIA, and a large bibliography and index. Booklist commented in its review that the encyclopedia was a good resource to have in libraries at the academic, public, and high school levels. Publishers Weekly reviewed the encyclopedia and criticized Smith's objectivity, suggesting that he took an unabashedly positive view of the agency's role and focused exclusively on its operational successes. Despite the issue with bias, the review concluded that the book was still a useful reference work.

== See also ==
- Conspiracy Encyclopedia
- Legacy of Ashes (book)
