= Romance scam =

Confidence trick using romantic intentions

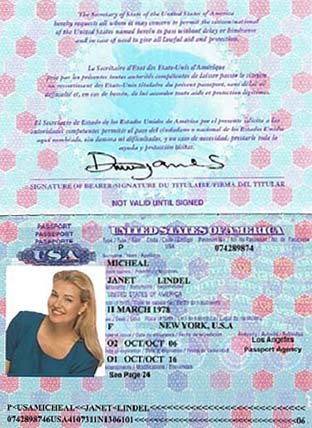
A falsified passport used in an Internet romance scam. The deception can be obvious to observers — for example, the photo on this passport does not comply with regulations for size or pose — but victims often overlook these signs.

A romance scam is a confidence trick involving feigning romantic intentions towards a victim, gaining the victim's affection, and then using that goodwill to get the victim to send money to the scammer under false pretenses or to commit fraud against the victim. Fraudulent acts may involve access to the victim's money, bank accounts, credit cards, passports, digital wallets, e-mail accounts, or national identification numbers; or forcing the victims to commit financial fraud on their behalf. These scams are often perpetrated by a fraud factory operated by organized criminal gangs, who work together to take money from multiple victims at a time. Pig butchering scam (PBS or PB Scam) is increasingly rampant and widespread type of romance scam which usually also entail the high-yield investment program (HYIP) scam.

Scams can be detected and prevented with simple precautions. More money is lost each year to romance scams than to similar internet scams, such as technical support scams.

== Modus operandi ==
The mode of scam, which has several variations, usually works on the following script.

=== Fake personal images ===
Romance scammers create personal profiles using stolen photographs or images generated by AI of attractive people for the purpose of asking others to contact them. This is often known as catfishing. Often photos of unknown actresses or models will be used to lure the victim into believing they are talking to that person. US military members are also impersonated, as pretending to serve in the military explains why the scammer is not available for an in-person meeting.

Because the scammers often look nothing like the photos they send to the victims, the scammers rarely meet the victims face to face or even in a video call. They deceive their intended victims by making plausible-sounding excuses about their unwillingness to show their faces, such as by saying that they cannot meet yet because they are temporarily traveling or have a broken web camera.

=== Tricking the victim ===
Scammers are very adept at knowing how to "play" their victims – sending love poems, sex games in emails, building up a "loving relationship" with many promises of "one day we will be married". Scammers ask their victims many questions, but share little about themselves. They often shower the victims with compliments.

Communications are exchanged between the scammer and victim over a period of time, sometimes months or even an entire year, until the scammer feels they have connected with the victim enough to ask for money. Scammers prey on the victims' false sense of a relationship to lure them into sending money.

These requests may be for gas money, bus or airplane tickets to visit the victim, medical or education expenses. There is usually the promise the scammer will one day join the victim in the victim's home.

Victims may be invited to travel to the scammer's country; in some cases the victims arrive with asked-for gift money for family members or bribes for corrupt officials, only to be beaten and robbed or murdered.

The scam usually ends when the victim realizes they are being scammed or stops sending money. However, people are often slow to believe the reality, and the stigma of falling for such deception may deter them from reporting the fraud to the police. Many victims, even when confronted with strong evidence, cannot bring themselves to believe that the person who seems so loving in text messages is instead a criminal scammer. They may react angrily or violently against anyone who objects. Banks can lock down the victim's money, especially when financial abuse of an elder is suspected.

=== Criminal groups ===
Criminal networks defraud lonely people around the world with false promises of love and romance. Scammers post profiles on dating websites, non-dating social media accounts, classified sites and even online forums to search for new victims. The scammer usually attempts to obtain a more private method of communication, such as an email or phone number, to build trust with the victim.

Because the scammers are working in groups, someone in the group can be online and available to send e-mail or text messages to the victim at any hour. The rotation between different scammers, all claiming to be the same person, is difficult to detect in text-based messages, whereas it would be obvious if a different person showed up for a face-to-face meeting or in a video or telephone call.

== Scale ==
=== Australia ===
According to the Australian government, the crime has also been in the rise in that country. Monetary loss in Australia rose from $20.5 million to $28.6 million from 2017 to 2019. SCAMwatch, a website run by the Australian Competition & Consumer Commission (ACCC), provides information about how to recognise, avoid and report scams. In 2005, the ACCC and other agencies formed the Australasian Consumer Fraud Taskforce (ACFT). The site provides information about current scams, warning signs and staying safe online.

=== Philippines ===
The Cybercrime Investigation and Coordinating Center has received 123 formal complaints related to romance scams, also known locally as “love scams”, in 2025.

=== United Kingdom ===
According to UK Finance, romance scams were the fastest growing category of cybercrime in the United Kingdom in 2023, increasing by a third from 2022 to a total loss of £93m.

=== United States ===
In 2023, the US Federal Bureau of Investigation received reports of more than US $650 million being lost by victims of relationship scams. This was approximately seven times what was stolen through phishing scams and almost 100 times the reported losses from ransomware attacks. According to FBI IC3 statistics, the crime has been at an alarming rise. Monetary loss in the United States rose from $211 million to $475 million from 2017 to 2019. In 2023, the U.S. Federal Trade Commission received 64,003 reports of romance scams, with reported losses totalling approximately US$1.14 billion and a median individual loss of US$2,000. The number of cases of reported romance scams rose from 15,372 to 19,473 in those two years. In 2025, the FBI's Internet Crime Complaint Center logged 23,159 complaints in its confidence/romance fraud category, which also covers schemes exploiting family or friendship ties, with reported losses of $929,287,469; the 2024 figures were 17,910 complaints and $672,009,052.

"The FTC estimated on average $2,500 was sent to romance scammers in 2020, more than ten times the median loss across all fraud types. Given the rampant use of social media and rise of online dating services, the opportunity for scammers to prey on individuals is only growing, explained Emma Fletcher, an analyst at the FTC. "To be able to make that connection and do it remotely is something that may not have been possible a decade ago, but it's very much possible and socially quite common now for people to make love connections online and they're taking advantage of that," Fletcher said."

== Target demographics ==
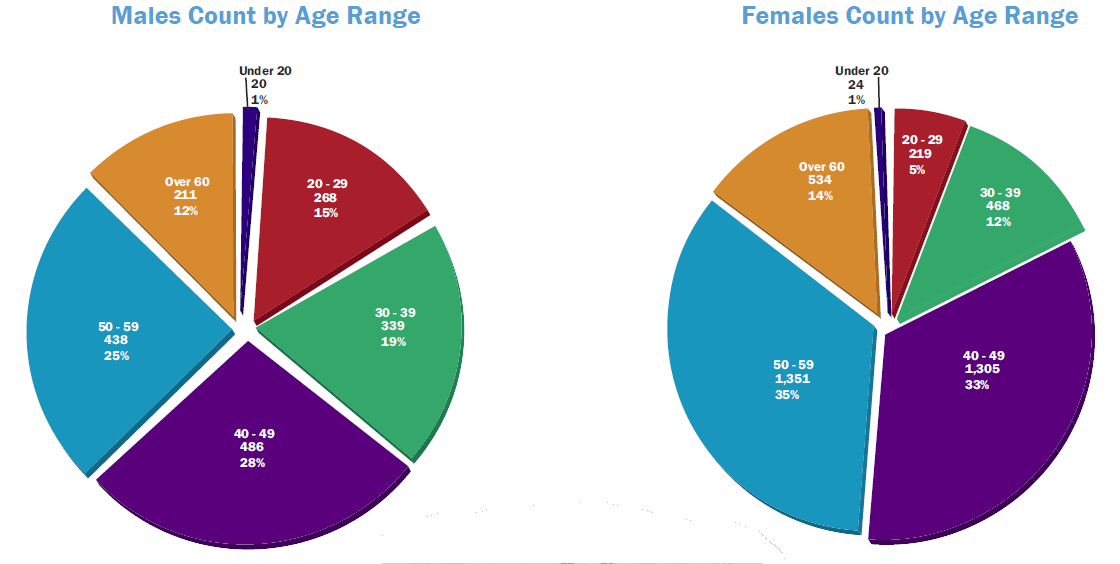
Gender and age demographics of victims of online romance scams in 2011

Many victims are in their 40s to mid-60s, seeking a companion. Elderly people are often targeted, because they are more likely to have assets, such as retirement funds or homes, that can be stolen. Victims tend to have an unmet emotional need for companionship, as well as a desire for greater economic security and a lack of purpose in life.

Sensitive people are more vulnerable to online dating scams, based on a study conducted by the British Psychological Society. According to their results, sensitive and less emotionally intelligent people are more likely to be vulnerable to online dating scams.

Autistic people are also especially vulnerable to romance scams, as they struggle to interpret motivations.

Some people are serial victims: even after one scam is uncovered, they are still susceptible and will fall for another scammer with a different story.

== Variations ==
Narratives used to extract money from the victims of romance scams include the following:

- Saying their boss has paid them in postal money orders, and asks the victim to cash the forged money orders and then wire money to the scammer. The bank eventually reverts the money order cash but not the wire transfer.
- Saying they need the victim to send money to pay for a passport.
- Saying they require money for flights to the victim's country because they are being held back in their home country by a family member or spouse. In all cases the scammer never comes, or instead says that they are being held against their will by immigration authorities who are demanding bribes.
- Saying they have had gold bars or other valuables seized by customs and need to pay taxes to them before they can recover their items and join the victim in their country.
- Saying they need money to join the victim in his or her country, after meeting on an online dating site.
- Saying they are being held against their will for failure to pay a bill.
- Saying they need money to pay hospital bills.
- Saying they need the money to pay their phone bills in order to continue communicating with the victim.
- Saying they need the money for their own or their parents' urgent medical treatment.
- The scammer actually is employed directly or indirectly by a website, with a share of the victim's member or usage fees passed on to the scammer.
- Sometimes the scammers do not explicitly ask the victim for money, but instead coerce them to receive packages (often purchased by the scammers with stolen credit cards) and forward the items to their country.

=== Pig butchering scam ===
In pig butchering scams, scammers will first contact and attempt to gain trust with victims – often with elaborate fake identities presenting as attractive and preying on a victim's desire for companionship. Scammers will then introduce a seemingly profitable cryptocurrency investment opportunity that they encourage victims to make increasing investments into. Finally, once a substantial amount is collected or when victims try to collect funds, the scammer will become unreachable to the victim, leaving them with no way to recover funds.

Many of the perpetrators are also victims lured from abroad under false pretenses and then forced to commit the fraud by organized crime gangs.

=== Blackmail ===
Some romance scammers seek out a victim with an obscure fetish and will make the victim think that if they pay for the scammer's plane ticket, they will get to live out their sexual fantasy with the scammer. Other scammers like to entice victims to perform sexual acts on webcam. They then record their victims, play back the recorded images or videos to them, and then extort money to prevent them from sending the recordings to friends, family, or employers, often discovered via social media sites such as Facebook or Twitter.

=== Pro-daters ===
The pro-dater differs from other scams in method of operation: a face-to-face meeting actually does take place in the scammer's country but for the sole purpose of manipulating the victim into spending as much money as possible in relatively little time, with little or nothing in return. The scheme usually involves accomplices, such as an interpreter or a taxi driver, each of whom must be paid by the victim at an inflated price. Everything is pre-arranged so that the wealthy foreigner pays for expensive accommodation, is taken not to an ordinary public café but to a costly restaurant (usually some out-of-the-way place priced far above what locals would ever be willing to pay), and is manipulated into making various expensive purchases, including gifts for the scammer such as electronics and fur coats.

The vendors are also typically part of the scheme. After the victim has left, the merchandise is returned to the vendors and the pro-dater and their various accomplices take their respective cut of the take. As the pro-dater is eager to date again, the next date is immediately set up with the next wealthy foreigner.

The supposed relationship goes no further, except to inundate the victim with requests for more money after they return home. Unlike a gold digger, who marries for money, a pro-dater is not necessarily single or available in real life.

=== 419 scams ===
Another variation of the romance scam is when the scammer insists they need to marry in order to inherit millions of dollars of gold left by a father, uncle, or grandfather. A young woman will contact a victim and tell him of her plight: not being able to remove the gold from her country as she is unable to pay the duty or marriage taxes. The woman will be unable to inherit the fortune until she gets married, the marriage being a prerequisite of the father, uncle or grandfather's will.

The scammer convinces their victim they are sincere until they are able to build up enough of a rapport to ask for thousands of dollars to help bring the gold into the victim's country. The scammer will offer to fly to the victim's country to prove they are a real person so the victim will send money for the flight. However, the scammer never arrives. The victim will contact the scammer to ask what happened, and the scammer will provide an excuse such as not being able to get an exit visa, or an illness, theirs or a family member.

=== Impersonation of military personnel ===
A rapidly growing technique scammers use is to impersonate American military personnel. Scammers prefer to use the images, names and profiles of soldiers as this usually inspires confidence, trust and admiration in their victims. Military public relations often post information on soldiers without mentioning their families or personal lives, so images are stolen from these websites by organized Internet crime gangs often operating out of Nigeria or Ghana.

These scammers tell their victims they are lonely, or supporting an orphanage with their own money, or needing financial assistance because they cannot access their own money in a combat zone. The money is always sent to a third party to be collected for the scammer. Sometimes the third party is real, sometimes fictitious. Funds sent by Western Union and MoneyGram do not have to be claimed by showing identification if the sender sends money using a secret pass phrase and response. The money can be picked up anywhere in the world. Some scammers may request Bitcoin as an alternative payment method.

=== eWhoring ===
In eWhoring, a scammer uses a collection of stolen nude or explicit photos to impersonate a specific person to sell more photos and video to a victim, entice them into sending money for promised dates, cam sessions, or in-person meet-ups, or to distribute phishing links. The original photo sets may originally have been consensually shared by the person being impersonated, or can be the result of revenge porn, hacks or other theft. As with other Romance scams, reports of eWhoring grew dramatically during the coronavirus pandemic.

Impersonation can range from outright fraud to more complicated practices like chat teams, in which the person in the photos may hire a third-party or chat team to impersonate them through direct messages, selling photos to fans directly. In response to concerns over impersonation, potential victims may request specific photos with proof that it is actually them, such as holding a specific object or writing a specific message on a piece of paper. In May 2023, the adult subscription site My.Club instituted a "No Fake Creators" policy, and announced that every person using the platform to sell photos, videos or conversation would be required to undergo identity verification, including facial scanning, each time they logged onto the platform.

== Cultural references ==
- The Swedish film Raskenstam (1983; alternate title, Casanova of Sweden) is a fictionalized romantic comedy based on the true story of Swedish banker Gustaf Raskenstam, who seduced over 100 women and convinced many to support his various projects financially. Another famous one was Karl Vesterberg who usually used newspaper contact ads, often with the headline "Sun and spring", which has become an idiomatic expression in Sweden. The film was directed by Gunnar Hellström, written by Hellström and Birgitta Stenberg, and executive produced by Hellström and Brian Wikström.
- Raymond Fernandez and Martha Beck's (1914–1951) real life story is depicted in several films and television episodes, the American serial killer couple known as "The Lonely Hearts Killers", who are believed to have killed as many as 20 women during their murderous spree between 1947 and 1949. The pair met their unsuspecting victims through lonely hearts ads.
  - The Honeymoon Killers (1969 film)
  - Deep Crimson (1996 film)
  - Lonely Hearts (2006 film)
  - Cold Case: "Lonely Hearts" (season 4, episode 9), airdate 19 November 2006.
  - Alleluia (2014 film)
- SPAMasterpiece Theater (2008) web series featured an episode "Love Song of Kseniya" that centered on a romance scam email spam read by website Boing Boing's Xeni Jardin.
- Ladies vs Ricky Bahl (2011) Indian Hindi-language film – a romantic comedy which revolves around a group of women teaming up to pull an elaborate con on the con artist Ricky Bahl who has conned them.
- Nine Perfect Strangers (2018) the novel and miniseries, one of the characters has a mental breakdown after falling in love with, and subsequently losing thousands to, a perpetrator of a romance scam.

== See also ==
- 419 scams
- Advance-fee scam
- Badger game
- Catfishing
- Celebrity impersonation scams on social media
- Pig butchering scam
- Scam baiting
