= Operations Coordinating Board =

The Operations Coordinating Board (OCB) was a committee of the United States Executive created in 1953 by President Eisenhower's Executive Order 10483 and tasked with oversight of United States covert operations. Eisenhower simultaneously gave secret instructions specifying additional functions for the new entity. The board, which reported to the National Security Council was responsible for integrating the implementation of national security policies across several agencies. An important part of its mandate was to act as the president's coordinating committee for the most incendiary secret foreign policy actions, such as covert operations.

The board's membership was to include the Under Secretary of State, who was to chair the board, the Deputy Secretary of Defense, the Director of the Foreign Operations Administration, the Director of Central Intelligence, and the President's Special Assistant for Psychological Warfare. Also authorized to attend were the President's Special Assistant for National Security Affairs and the Director of the United States Information Agency.

== History ==
The creation of the board was a recommendation of the Jackson Committee, chaired by William Harding Jackson, set-up to propose future United States Government information and psychological warfare programs. The same committee recommended the existing Psychological Strategy Board be abolished.

The OCB was originally a separate body, but became an official part of the NSC with Eisenhower's issuance of Executive Order 10700 in 1957.

== Abolition and Succession ==
The Operations Coordinating Board was abolished by President Kennedy on February 19, 1961 because it was thought that secret wars should not be overseen by so many officials. By that time, much of OCB's work was being continued by other bodies, such as the Planning Coordination Group (PCG), pursuant to presidential directive Covert Operations NSC 5412/12 in 1955, and by the Special Group.
