= CONUS Intel scandal =

Department of Defense surveillance operation

The CONUS Intel scandal, sometimes also called the Army files scandal, was a minor political scandal in the United States involving the Department of Defense and National Security Agency that revolved around covert, illegal domestic surveillance and the DoD's subsequent concealed use of ARPANET, belonging to its agency, now DARPA, coordinated with the NSA to evade Congressional orders with regard to information collected during the Johnson and Nixon administrations.

== Background ==
The Cold War US policy-making climate allowed for the "red hunt" in the form of the overarching FBI COINTELPRO program mandate to "win defections" within the weakened US Communist Party. On the heels of other similar FBI, CIA, and NSA direct and indirect surveillance programs operating in the US concerning "anti-war sentiment", as well as the demands of President Lyndon B. Johnson's advisors to find out "how and why demonstrators [were] so well organized", Army intelligence, in immediate response to Black rebellions in urban ghettos, set up its CONUS INTEL program in late 1967, with 1,500 Army intelligence agents monitoring protest groups and events all over the country. Between 1967 and 1970, the Army had files on "at least 100,000" US citizens.

== 1971 Senate subcommittee hearing ==
Law professor, former Army captain in intelligence and journalist Christopher Pyle’s disclosure of the CONUS INTEL program immediately led to the first full-fledged Congress inquiry into intelligence affairs.

In a Senate subcommittee chaired by Senator Sam Ervin, Pyle testified that the US Army was taking "spot report" dossiers on "between seven and nine million" US citizens participating in "demonstrations, protests and various kinds of civil disorder, which happen to mention someone whose security clearance dossier is on file". MIT campus newspaper The Tech reported that, "according to reliable sources," the information was stored in the US Army Intelligence Command Headquarters at Fort Holabird, Maryland, and, "according to intelligence sources," transferred and stored at the National Security Agency headquarters at Fort Meade, Maryland. "The Army files [collected during the Johnson and Nixon administrations] were transmitted on the ARPANET in about January 1972, sources [that include former military intelligence officers] say, more than two years after the material—and the data banks maintained at the Fort Holabird facility—were ordered destroyed [by Congress]."

== Aftermath ==
Pyle and Ervin continued to investigate government activities; together with the Church Committee inquiries, these Congressional studies led to the drafting of the Foreign Intelligence Surveillance Act.

== See also ==
- ECHELON, SHAMROCK, RESISTANCE, HTLINGUAL, MINARET, MERRIMAC
- COINTELPRO
- Warrantless searches in the United States

== Notes ==
1.E.g. The Tech and ACLU lawyer John Shattuck used the neologistic idiomatic proper noun adjunct Army instead of the possessive proper noun Army's at the time
