= Operation Mockingbird =

Alleged program of the CIA

Operation Mockingbird is an alleged large-scale program of the United States Central Intelligence Agency (CIA) that began in the early years of the Cold War and attempted to manipulate domestic American news media organizations for propaganda purposes. According to author Deborah Davis, Operation Mockingbird recruited leading American journalists into a propaganda network and influenced the operations of front groups. CIA support of front groups was exposed when an April 1967 Ramparts article reported that the National Student Association (NSA) received funding from the CIA. In 1975, Church Committee Congressional investigations revealed Agency connections with journalists and civic groups.

In 1973, a document referred to as the "Family Jewels" was published by the CIA containing a reference to a different operation named "Project Mockingbird", which was the name of an operation in 1963 which wiretapped two syndicated columnists, Robert Allen and Paul Scott, "from March 12 to June 15, 1963". They had published articles based on classified material. The document does not contain references to "Operation Mockingbird".

== Background ==
In the early years of the Cold War, efforts were made by the United States government to use mass media to influence public opinion internationally. After the United States Senate Watergate Committee in 1973 uncovered domestic surveillance abuses directed by the Executive branch of the United States government and The New York Times in 1974 published an article by Seymour Hersh claiming the CIA had violated its charter by spying on anti-war activists, former CIA officials and some lawmakers called for a congressional inquiry that became known as the Church Committee.

Published in 1976, the committee's report confirmed some earlier stories that charged that the CIA had cultivated relationships with private institutions, including the press. Without identifying individuals by name, the Church Committee stated that it found fifty journalists who had official, but secret, relationships with the CIA.

In a 1977 Rolling Stone magazine article, "The CIA and the Media," reporter Carl Bernstein expanded upon the Church Committee's report and wrote that more than 400 US press members had secretly carried out assignments for the CIA, including New York Times publisher Arthur Hays Sulzberger, columnist and political analyst Stewart Alsop and Time magazine. Bernstein documented the way in which overseas branches of major US news agencies had for many years served as the "eyes and ears" of Operation Mockingbird, which functioned to disseminate CIA propaganda through domestic US media.

In Katharine the Great, Deborah Davis' 1979 unauthorized biography of Katharine Graham, owner of The Washington Post, the author states that the CIA ran an "Operation Mockingbird" during this time, writing that the Prague-based International Organization of Journalists (IOJ) "received money from Moscow and controlled reporters on every major newspaper in Europe, disseminating stories that promoted the Communist cause". Davis states that Frank Wisner, director of the Office of Policy Coordination (a covert operations unit created in 1948 by the United States National Security Council) had created Operation Mockingbird in response to the IOJ, recruiting Phil Graham from The Washington Post to run the project within the industry. According to Davis, "By the early 1950s, Wisner 'owned' respected members of The New York Times, Newsweek, CBS and other communications vehicles." Davis wrote that after Cord Meyer joined the CIA in 1951, he became Operation Mockingbird's "principal operative."

In his 2019 book The Rising Clamor: The American Press, the Central Intelligence Agency, and the Cold War, David P. Hadley wrote that the "continued lack of specific details [provided by the Church Committee and Bernstein's exposé] proved a breeding ground for some outlandish claims regarding CIA and the press". He mentioned that Davis provided no information on her sources for her 1979 biography of Katharine Graham and that the Church Committee and other investigations that followed it did not reveal an operation as described by Davis. According to Hadley, "Mockingbird, as described by Davis, has remained a stubbornly persistent theory"; and added, "The Davis/Mockingbird theory, that the CIA operated a deliberate and systematic program of widespread manipulation of the U.S. media, does not appear to be grounded in reality, but that should not disguise the active role the CIA played in influencing the domestic press's output."

== See also ==
- Anti-communism
- Anti-Russian sentiment
- Anti-Sovietism
- CIA influence on public opinion
- Congress for Cultural Freedom
- Operation Earnest Voice
- Propaganda in the United States
- Psychological warfare
- Radio Free Asia
- Radio Free Europe/Radio Liberty
- Rome Daily American
- White propaganda

== General and cited references ==
- Davis, Deborah (1979). Katharine The Great: Katharine Graham and The Washington Post. Harcourt Brace Jovanovich. ISBN 0151467846.
