= Family Jewels (Central Intelligence Agency) =

1973 report of illegal activities by the United States Central Intelligence Agency

Partly sanitized page from the "Family Jewels" files

The Family Jewels are a set of reports detailing potentially illegal, inappropriate and otherwise sensitive activities conducted by the Central Intelligence Agency (CIA) from 1959 to 1973. William Colby, the CIA director who received the reports, dubbed them the "skeletons in the CIA's closet". Most of the documents were released on June 25, 2007, after more than three decades of secrecy. The non-governmental National Security Archive filed a request for the documents under the Freedom of Information Act fifteen years before their release.

== Background ==
The reports that constitute the CIA's "Family Jewels" were commissioned in 1973 by then CIA director James R. Schlesinger in response to press accounts of CIA involvement in the Watergate scandal—in particular, support to the burglars, E. Howard Hunt and James McCord, both CIA veterans. On May 7, 1973, Schlesinger signed a directive commanding senior officers to compile a report of current or past CIA actions that may have fallen outside the agency's charter. The resulting report, which was in the form of a 693-page loose-leaf book of memos, was passed on to William Colby when he succeeded Schlesinger as Director of Central Intelligence in late 1973.

== Leaks and official release ==
Investigative journalist Seymour Hersh revealed some of the contents of the "Family Jewels" in a front-page New York Times article in December 1974, in which he reported that:

The Central Intelligence Agency, directly violating its charter, conducted a massive, illegal domestic intelligence operation during the Nixon Administration against the antiwar movement and other dissident groups in the United States according to well-placed Government sources.

Additional details of the contents trickled out over the years, but requests by journalists and historians for access to the documents under the Freedom of Information Act were long denied. Finally, in June 2007, CIA Director Michael Hayden announced that the documents would be released to the public at an announcement made to the annual meeting of the Society for Historians of American Foreign Relations. A six-page summary of the reports was made available at the National Security Archive (a non-governmental non profit organization based at George Washington University).

The Central Intelligence Agency violated its charter for 25 years until revelations of illegal wiretapping, domestic surveillance, assassination plots, and human experimentation led to official investigations and reforms in the 1970s, according to declassified documents posted today on the Web by the National Security Archive at George Washington University.

The complete set of documents, with some redactions (including a number of pages in their entirety), was released on the CIA website on June 25, 2007.

Congressional investigators had access to the "Family Jewels" in the 1970s, and its existence was known for years before its declassification. (Note: For example, in the August 27, 1988 edition of The Nation, David Corn wrote: "The public pillorying of the C.I.A. and the baring of its darkest secrets - what insiders call the family jewels - led to a loss of face for the spooks and a free fall in Company morale.")

== Content ==
The reports describe numerous activities conducted by the CIA from the 1950s to 1970s that may have violated its charter. According to a briefing provided by CIA director William Colby to the Justice Department on December 31, 1974, these included 18 issues which presented legal questions:

1. Confinement of a KGB defector, Yuri Ivanovich Nosenko, that "might be regarded as a violation of the kidnapping laws"
2. Wiretapping of two syndicated columnists, Robert Allen and Paul Scott, "from March 12 to June 15, 1963". (see also Project Mockingbird)
3. Physical surveillance of investigative journalist and muckraker Jack Anderson and his associates, including Les Whitten of The Washington Post and future Fox News Channel anchor and managing editor Brit Hume. Jack Anderson had written two articles on CIA-backed assassination attempts on Cuban dictator Fidel Castro
4. Physical surveillance of Michael Getler, then a Washington Post reporter, who was later an ombudsman for The Washington Post and PBS
5. Break-in at the home of a former CIA employee
6. Break-in at the office of a former defector
7. Warrantless entry into the apartment of a former CIA employee
8. Opening of mail to and from the Soviet Union from 1953 to 1973 (including letters associated with actress Jane Fonda) (project SRPOINTER/HTLINGUAL at JFK airport)
9. Opening of mail to and from the People's Republic of China from 1969 to 1972 (project SRPOINTER/HTLINGUAL at JFK airport – see also Project SHAMROCK by the NSA)
10. Funding of behavior modification research on unwitting U.S. citizens, including unscientific, non-consensual human experiments (see also Project MKULTRA concerning LSD experiments)
11. Assassination plots against Cuban dictator Fidel Castro; DR Congolese leader Patrice Lumumba; President Rafael Trujillo of the Dominican Republic; and René Schneider, commander-in-chief of the Chilean Army. All of these plots were said to be unsuccessful
12. Surveillance of dissident groups between 1967 and 1971 (see Project RESISTANCE, Project MERRIMAC and Operation CHAOS)
13. Surveillance of a particular Latin American female and of US citizens in Detroit
14. Surveillance of former CIA officer and agency critic Victor Marchetti, author of the book The CIA and the Cult of Intelligence, published in 1974
15. Amassing of files on 9,900-plus US citizens related to the antiwar movement (see Project RESISTANCE, Project MERRIMAC and Operation CHAOS)
16. Polygraph experiments with the sheriff of San Mateo County, California
17. Fake CIA identification documents that might violate state laws
18. Testing of electronic equipment on US telephone circuits

== Reactions to release ==
Then-president of Cuba, Fidel Castro, who was the target of multiple CIA assassination attempts reported in these documents, responded to their release on July 1, 2007, saying that the United States was still a "killing machine" and that the revealing of the documents was an attempt at diversion. David Corn of the magazine The Nation wrote that one key 'jewel' had been redacted and remained classified.

In 2009, Daniel L. Pines, the assistant general counsel of the Office of General Counsel within the CIA, wrote a law review published in the Indiana Law Journal challenging the assertion that most of the activities described within the Family Jewels were illegal during the time they were conducted. In his conclusion, Pines wrote: "Admittedly, several of the operations mounted during that period failed to comply fully with the laws then in place. Yet, the vast majority of those operations did. Further, except for unconsenting human experimentation, each of the main types of activities depicted in the Family Jewels – targeted killings of foreign leaders, electronic surveillance of Americans, examination of U.S. mail, and collecting information on American dissident movements – was legal in the 1950s, 1960s, and 1970s."

== Mafia involvement in assassination attempts on Fidel Castro ==
According to the Family Jewels documents released, members of the American mafia were involved in CIA attempts to assassinate Cuban leader Fidel Castro. The documents showed that the CIA recruited Robert Maheu, an ex-FBI agent and aide to Howard Hughes in Las Vegas, to approach Johnny Roselli under the pretense of representing international corporations that wanted Castro dead due to lost gambling interests. Roselli introduced Maheu to mobster leaders Sam Giancana and Santo Trafficante, Jr. Supplied with six poison pills from the CIA, Giancana and Trafficante tried unsuccessfully to have people place the poison in Castro's food.

== Films ==
- 2025 - Cover-Up

== See also ==
- Black operation
- Church Committee
- COINTELPRO
- Human rights violations by the CIA
- U.S. Senate report on CIA torture
- Kerry Committee report
- Operation Northwoods
- Pike Committee
- Richard Helms
- Rockefeller Commission
