= Operation CHAOS =

Central Intelligence Agency domestic espionage project (1967–1974)

Operation CHAOS or Operation MHCHAOS was a Central Intelligence Agency (CIA) domestic espionage project that targeted American citizens between 1967 and 1974. Established by President Lyndon B. Johnson and expanded under President Richard Nixon, Operation CHAOS had as its alleged mission the uncovering of alleged foreign influence on protest movements concerned with racial equality, anti-war, and other issues, but many scholars describe CHAOS as an "initiative that aimed to sever links between social movements in the United States and those abroad".

The operation was launched under Director of Central Intelligence (DCI) Richard Helms by Chief of Counter-Intelligence James Jesus Angleton, and headed by Richard Ober. The CIA cryptonym "MH" in the name "MHCHAOS" signified that the program had a global area of operations.

== Background ==
The National Security Act of 1947 (later refined by the Central Intelligence Agency Act of 1949) created the CIA. The CIA was charged with the collection, correlation, and evaluation of intelligence. While the Act does not specify a prohibition on collecting domestic intelligence, or a restriction to only collect foreign intelligence, Executive Order 12333 of 1981 added prohibitions to limit CIA activities. The CIA began domestic recruiting operations in 1959 in the process of finding Cuban exiles who could be used in the campaign against Cuba and President Fidel Castro. As these operations expanded, the CIA formed a Domestic Operations Division in 1964. In 1965, President Lyndon Johnson requested that the CIA begin its own investigation into domestic dissent—independent of the FBI's ongoing COINTELPRO, which conducted similar activities.

The CIA developed numerous operations targeting American dissidents in the US. Many of these programs operated under the CIA's Office of Security, including:

- HTLINGUAL – Directed at letters passing between the United States and the then Soviet Union; the program involved the examination of correspondence to and from individuals or organizations placed on a watchlist.
- Project 2 – Directed at infiltration of foreign intelligence targets by agents posing as dissident sympathizers and which, like CHAOS, had placed agents within domestic radical organizations for the purposes of training and establishment of dissident credentials.
- Project MERRIMAC – Designed to infiltrate domestic antiwar and radical organizations thought to pose a threat to security of CIA property and personnel.
- Project RESISTANCE – Worked with college administrators, campus security and local police to identify anti-war activists and political dissidents without any infiltration taking place.

== Scale of operations ==
When Nixon came to office in 1969, existing domestic surveillance activities were consolidated into Operation CHAOS. Operation CHAOS first used CIA stations abroad to report on antiwar activities of American citizens travelling abroad, employing methods such as physical surveillance and electronic eavesdropping, utilising "liaison services" in maintaining such surveillance. The operations were later expanded to include 60 officers. In 1969, following the expansion, the operation began developing its own network of informants for the purposes of infiltrating various foreign anti-war groups located in foreign countries that might have ties to domestic groups.

Eventually, CIA officers expanded the program to include other leftist or counter-cultural groups with no discernible connection to Vietnam, such as groups operating within the women's liberation movement. The domestic spying of Operation CHAOS also targeted the Israeli embassy, and domestic Jewish groups such as the B'nai B'rith. In order to gather intelligence on the embassy and B'nai B'rith, the CIA purchased a garbage collection company to collect documents that were to be destroyed.

Targets of Operation CHAOS within the anti-war movement included:

- Students for a Democratic Society
- Black Panther Party
- Young Lords
- Women Strike for Peace
- Ramparts magazine

At its finality, Operation CHAOS contained files on 7,200 Americans, and a computer index totaling 300,000 civilians and approximately 1,000 groups.

== Findings ==
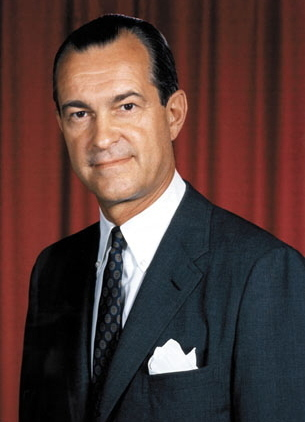
Richard Helms

The aim of the programs was to compile reports on "illegal and subversive" contacts between United States civilian protesters and "foreign elements" which "might range from casual contacts based merely on mutual interest to closely controlled channels for party directives."

DCI Richard Helms informed President Johnson on November 15, 1967, that the CIA had uncovered "no evidence of any contact between the most prominent peace movement leaders and foreign embassies in the U.S. or abroad." Helms repeated this assessment in 1969. In total, 6 reports were compiled for the White House and 34 for cabinet level officials.

== Exposure ==
The secret program was exposed by investigative journalist Seymour Hersh in a 1974 article in The New York Times entitled Huge CIA Operation Reported in US Against Antiwar Forces, Other Dissidents in Nixon Years. Amid the uproar of the Watergate break-in involving two former CIA officers, Operation CHAOS had been closed in 1973. Further details were revealed in 1975 during Representative Bella Abzug's House Subcommittee on Government Information and individual Rights. The government, in response to the revelations, felt pressured enough to launch the Commission on CIA Activities Within the United States (The Rockefeller Commission), led by then Vice President Nelson Rockefeller, to investigate the depth of the surveillance. Richard Cheney, then Deputy White House Chief of Staff, is noted as having stated that the purpose Rockefeller Commission was to avoid "congressional efforts to further encroach on the executive branch."

Following the revelations by the Rockefeller Commission, then-DCI George H. W. Bush admitted that "the operation in practice resulted in some improper accumulation of material on legitimate domestic activities."

== See also ==
- ECHELON
- NSA warrantless surveillance controversy
- Project Megiddo
- Project MINARET
- Project Mockingbird
- Project SHAMROCK
- Church Committee
