= The Americans =

2013 American period spy drama television series

- Genre: Period drama; Spy thriller
- Created by: Joe Weisberg
- Showrunners: Joe Weisberg; Joel Fields
- Starring: Keri Russell; Matthew Rhys; Maximiliano Hernández; Holly Taylor; Keidrich Sellati; Noah Emmerich; Annet Mahendru; Susan Misner; Alison Wright; Lev Gorn; Costa Ronin; Richard Thomas; Dylan Baker; Brandon J. Dirden; Margo Martindale
- Opening theme: "The Americans Theme" by Nathan Barr
- Composer: Nathan Barr
- Country of origin: United States
- Original languages: English; Russian
- No. of seasons: 6
- No. of episodes: 75 (list of episodes)

Production
- Executive producers: Joe Weisberg; Joel Fields; Graham Yost; Justin Falvey; Darryl Frank; Gavin O'Connor (pilot); Daniel Sackheim; Chris Long; Stephen Schiff
- Production location: New York City
- Running time: 39–59 minutes; 68 minutes (pilot and series finale)
- Production companies: Nemo Films; DreamWorks Television (pilot); Amblin Television; Fox Television Studios (seasons 1–2); Fox 21 Television Studios (seasons 3–6); FX Productions

Original release
- Network: FX
- Release: January 30, 2013 – May 30, 2018

The Americans is an American period spy drama television series created by Joe Weisberg for FX. It aired for six seasons from January 30, 2013, to May 30, 2018. Weisberg and Joel Fields also served as showrunners and executive producers. Set during the Cold War, the show follows Elizabeth (Keri Russell) and Philip Jennings (Matthew Rhys), two Soviet KGB intelligence officers posing as an American married couple living in Falls Church, a Virginia suburb of Washington, D.C. The couple combine their spying duties with raising their American-born children Paige (Holly Taylor) and Henry (Keidrich Sellati).

The Americans also explores the conflict between Washington's FBI office and the KGB Rezidentura there, from the perspectives of agents on both sides, including the Jenningses' neighbor Stan Beeman (Noah Emmerich), an FBI agent working in counterintelligence. The series begins in the aftermath of the inauguration of President Ronald Reagan in January 1981 and concludes in December 1987, shortly before the leaders of the United States and the Soviet Union signed the Intermediate-Range Nuclear Forces Treaty.

The show explores themes of marriage, identity, and parenthood, which were structured around the metaphorical connection between the Cold War and the Jenningses' marriage. The Americans was acclaimed by critics, many of whom considered it among the best television shows of its era; its writing, characters, and acting were often singled out. The series's final season earned Rhys the Primetime Emmy Award for Outstanding Lead Actor in a Drama Series, while Weisberg and Fields won Outstanding Writing for a Drama Series; it also received the Golden Globe Award for Best Television Series – Drama. Margo Martindale twice won the Primetime Emmy Award for Outstanding Guest Actress in a Drama Series for her performances in the third and fourth seasons. It was one of the rare drama shows to receive two Peabody Awards during its run. It has since been named one of the greatest television series of all time.

== Episodes ==
Season	Episodes	Originally released	
Season	Episodes	First released	Last released
1	13	January 30, 2013	May 1, 2013
2	13	February 26, 2014	May 21, 2014
3	13	January 28, 2015	April 22, 2015
4	13	March 16, 2016	June 8, 2016
5	13	March 7, 2017	May 30, 2017
6	10	March 28, 2018	May 30, 2018

== Cast and characters ==
The surnames of most of the Russian characters are not revealed. In scenes in the Soviet embassy, the characters address each other in a familiar but respectful manner, using given name and patronymic, without mentioning surnames (for example, "Ivanovich" means "son of Ivan" and "Sergeevna" means "daughter of Sergei").

=== Main ===
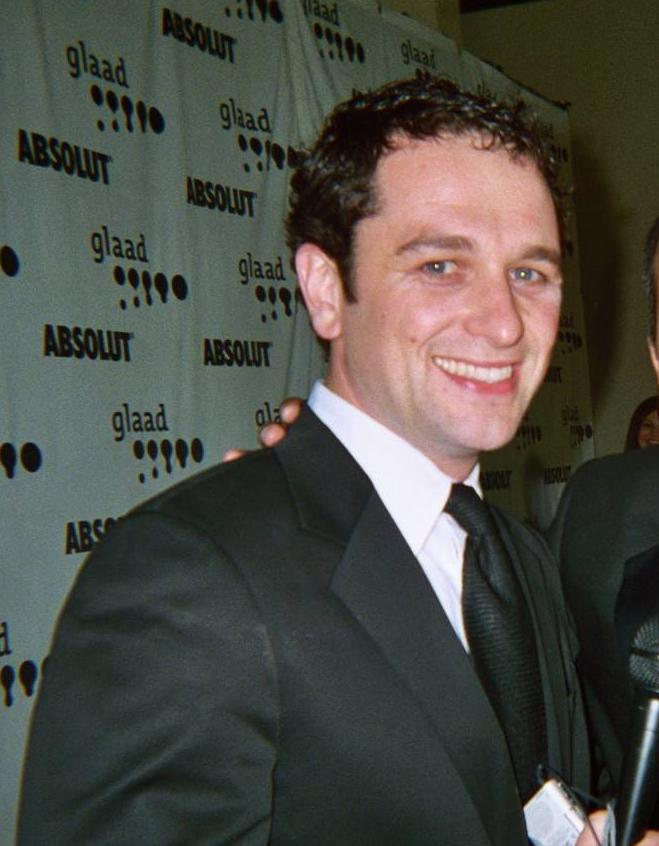
Matthew Rhys, who plays KGB officer Philip Jennings

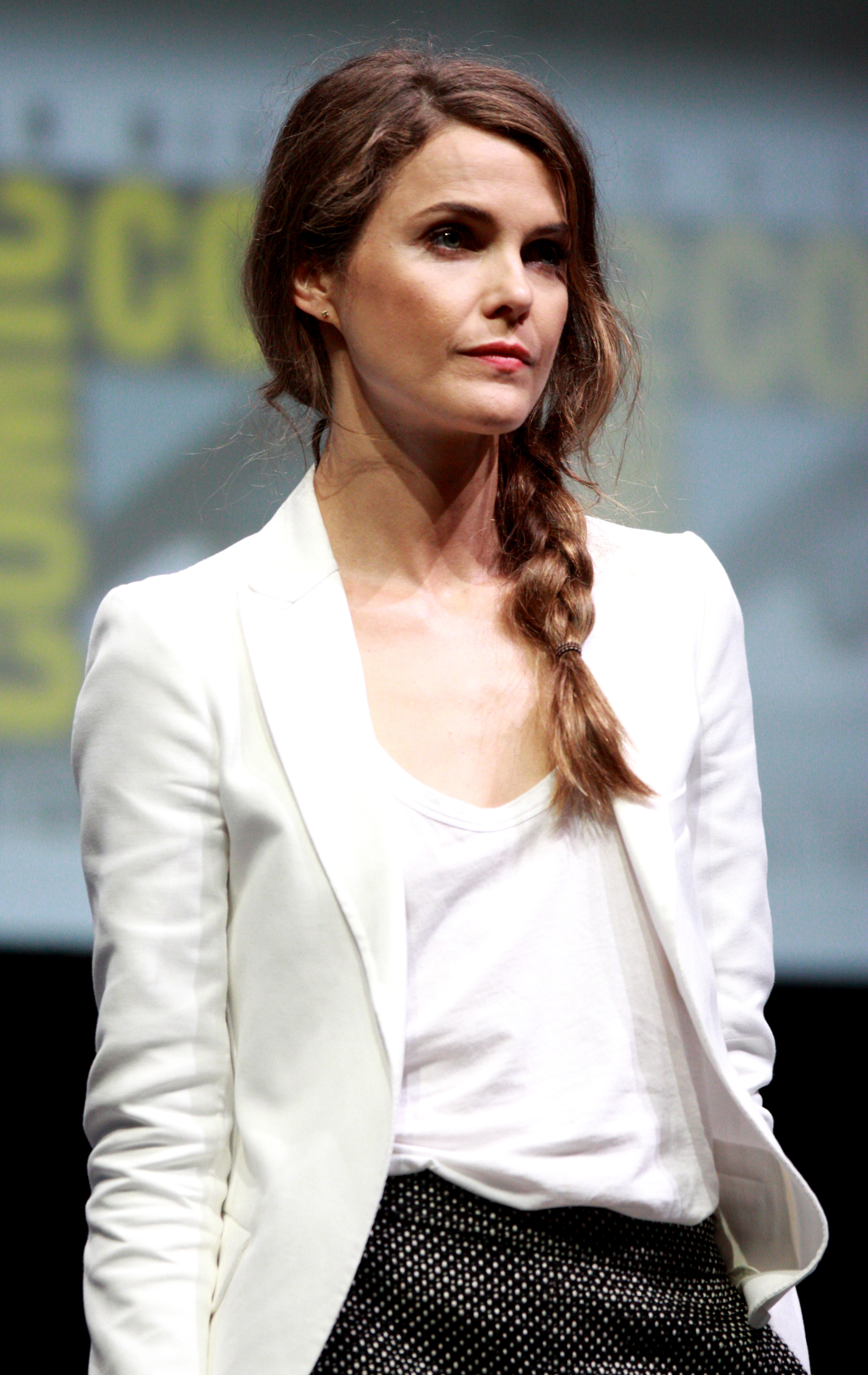
Keri Russell, who plays KGB officer Elizabeth Jennings

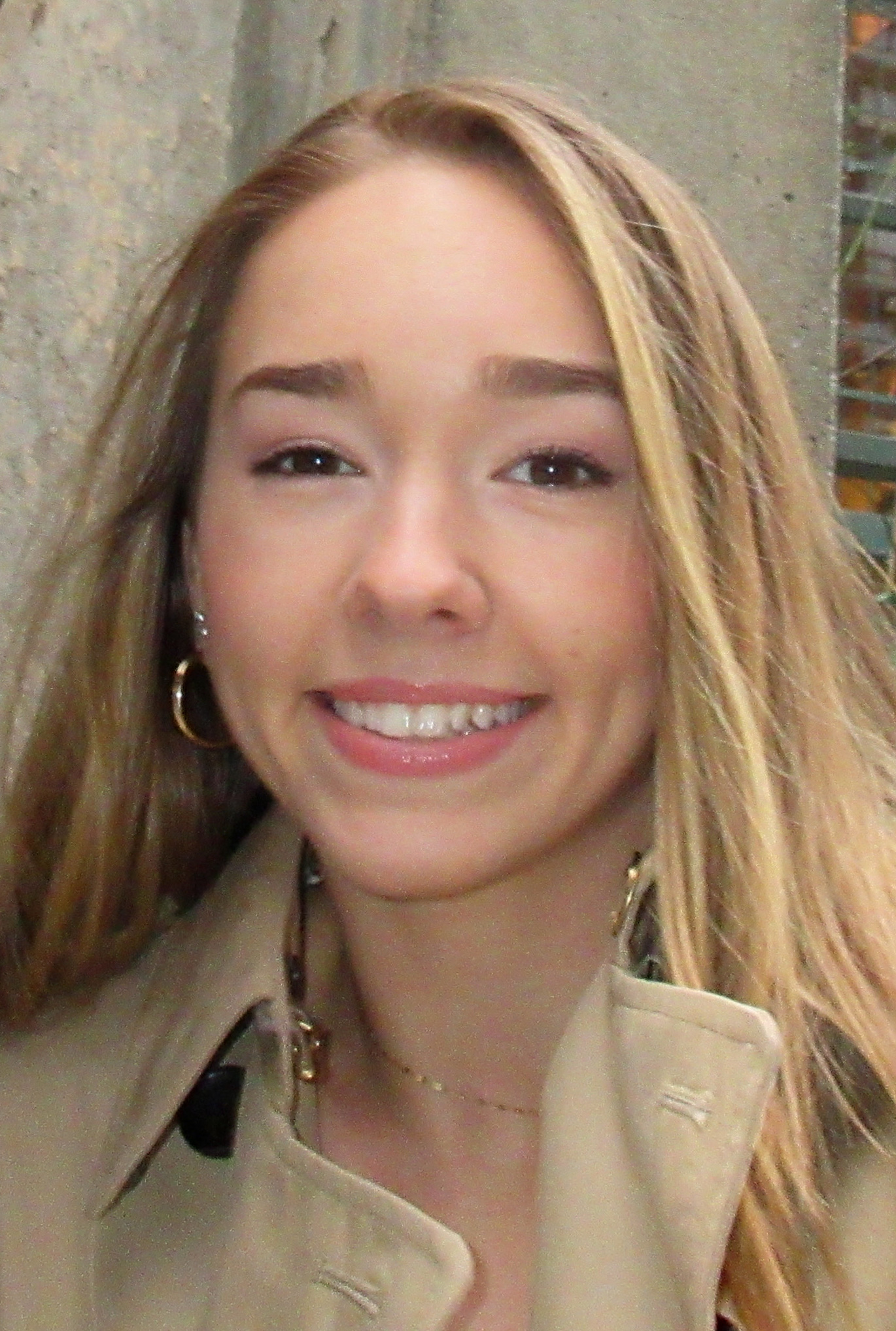
Holly Taylor, who plays Paige Jennings

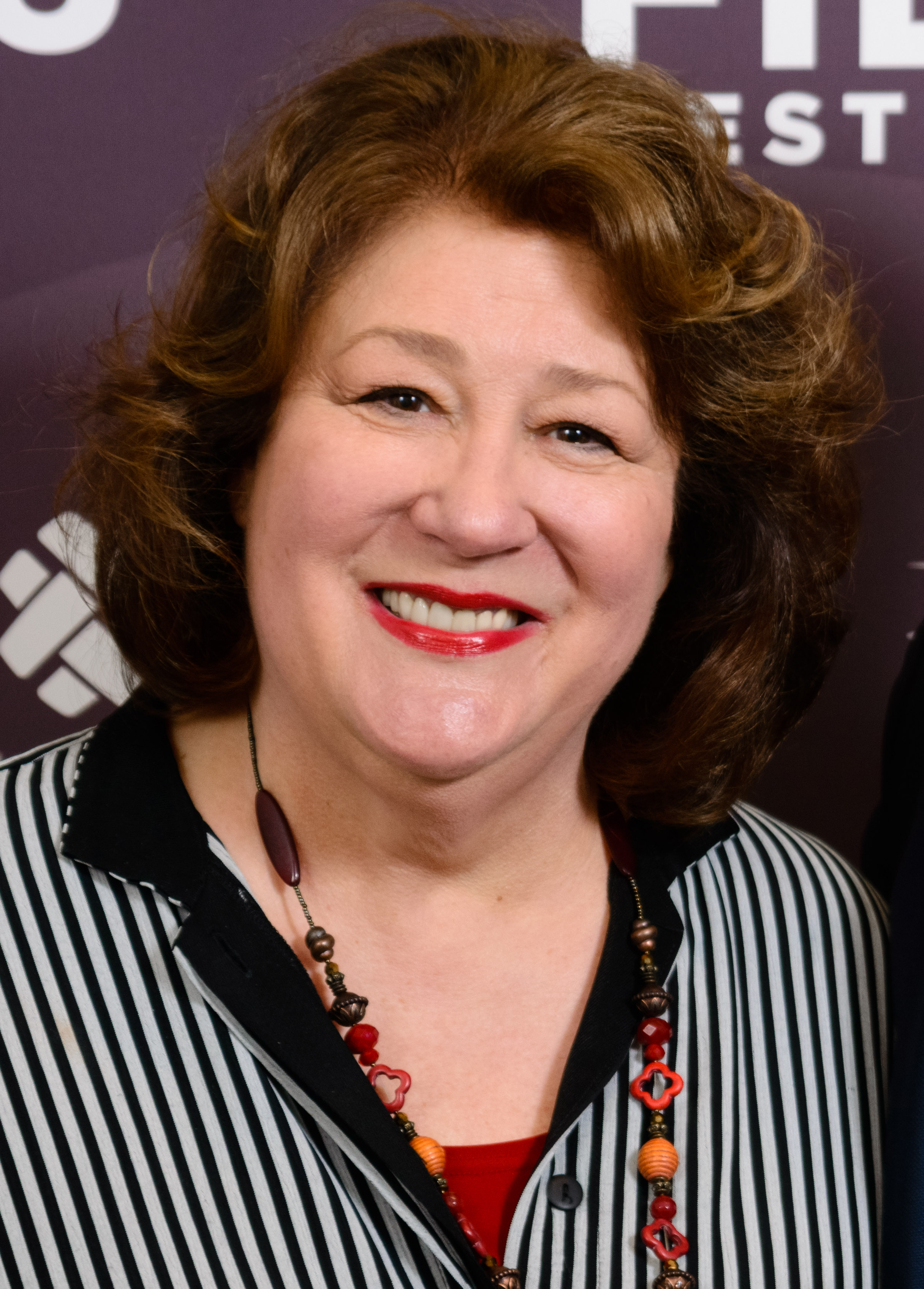
Margo Martindale, who plays KGB handler Claudia

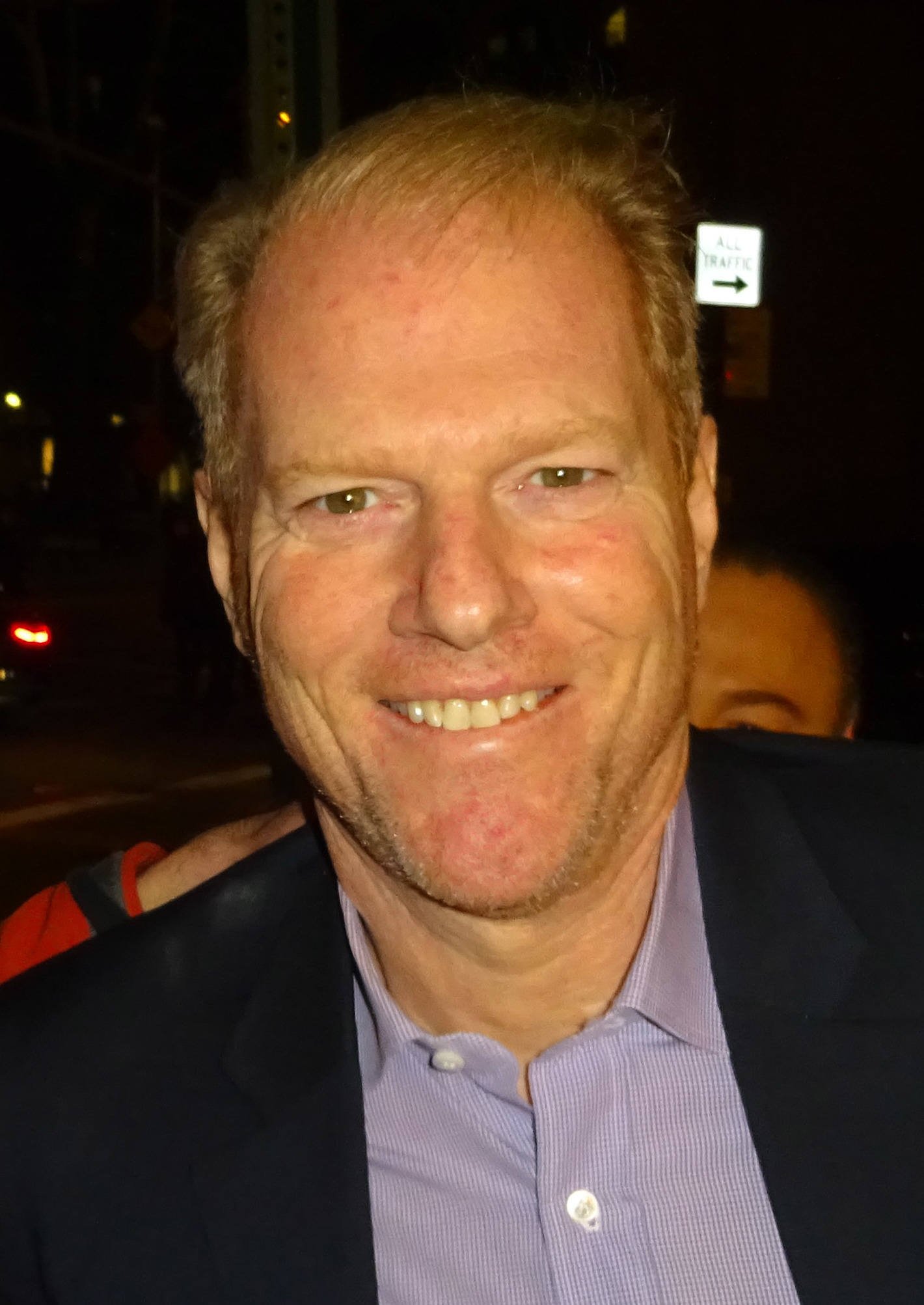
Noah Emmerich, who plays FBI Agent Stan Beeman

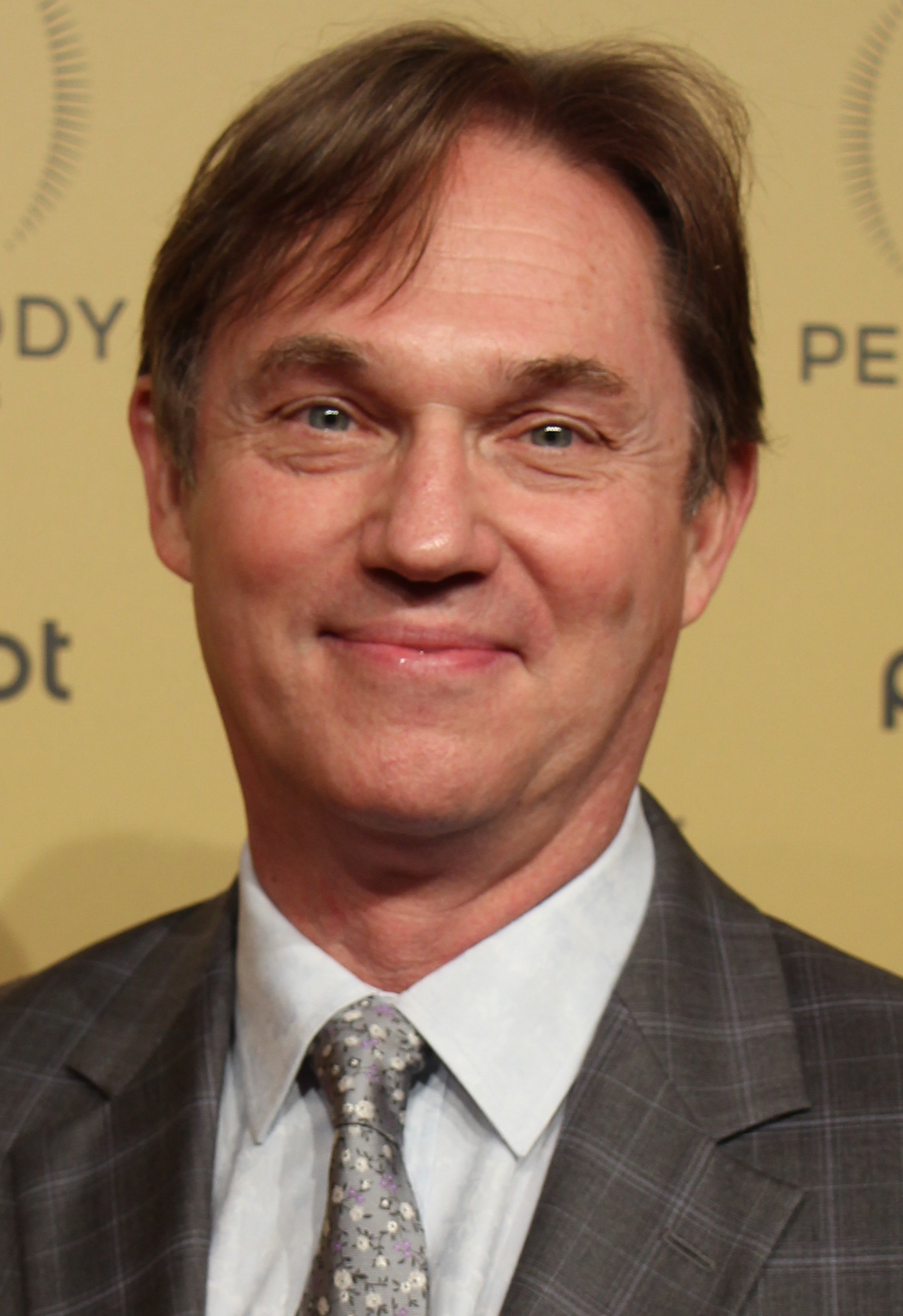
Richard Thomas, who plays FBI Special Agent Frank Gaad

- Keri Russell as Elizabeth Jennings (Nadezhda), a KGB officer and wife of Philip. In comparison to Philip, Elizabeth's allegiance to the KGB and the Soviet Union, as well as the ideology of communism, is stronger and more straightforward.
- Matthew Rhys as Philip Jennings (Mischa), a KGB officer and husband of Elizabeth. Although loyal to his cause, Philip holds little animosity towards the United States. Philip is close friends with Stan Beeman. As Clark, one of his false identities, Philip romances Martha, an FBI secretary, to obtain classified information.
- Maximiliano Hernández as Chris Amador, Stan's FBI partner (season 1)
- Holly Taylor as Paige Jennings, Elizabeth and Philip's daughter
- Keidrich Sellati as Henry Jennings, Elizabeth and Philip's son
- Noah Emmerich as Stan Beeman, an FBI counterintelligence agent and the Jenningses' neighbor. Unaware of the Jenningses' true nature, he is very close with the family and best friends with Philip.
- Annet Mahendru as Nina Sergeevna Krilova, a clerical worker turned KGB agent at the Soviet Embassy, and Stan's former informant and lover (main seasons 2–4; recurring season 1)
- Susan Misner as Sandra Beeman, Stan's wife (main seasons 2–3, recurring seasons 1 and 4)
- Alison Wright as Martha Hanson, Agent Gaad's secretary and Philip's informant (main seasons 2–4; recurring seasons 1 and 5)
- Lev Gorn as Arkady Ivanovich Zotov, the KGB's Rezident at the Soviet embassy (main seasons 3–4; recurring seasons 1–2 and 6)
- Costa Ronin as Oleg Igorevich Burov, originally the Soviet embassy's Science and Technology officer, a privileged son of a government minister who was appointed thanks to his father's connections so he could enjoy the comforts of the United States; at the end of season 4, returned to the USSR after his brother's death, in the KGB at first and then at his father's ministry (main seasons 3–6; recurring season 2)
- Richard Thomas as Frank Gaad, an FBI Special Agent and Stan's supervisor (main seasons 3–4; recurring seasons 1–2)
- Dylan Baker as William Crandall, a Russian agent and biochemical warfare scientist (season 4)
- Brandon J. Dirden as Dennis Aderholt, an FBI agent (seasons 4–6; recurring season 3)
- Margo Martindale as Claudia, the Jenningses' second and fifth KGB handler (main season 6; recurring seasons 1–2, 4–5; guest season 3)

=== Recurring ===
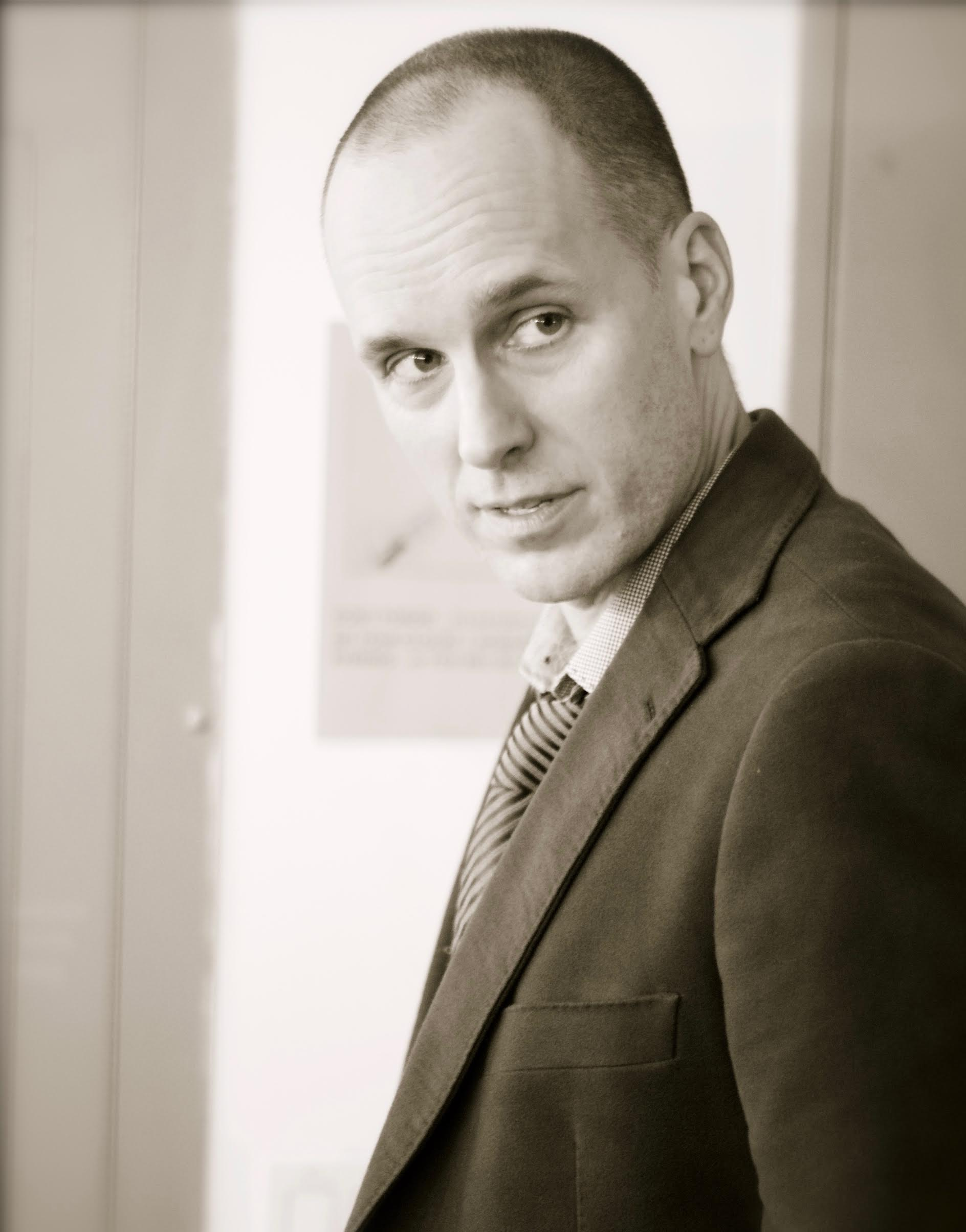
Kelly AuCoin, who plays Pastor Tim

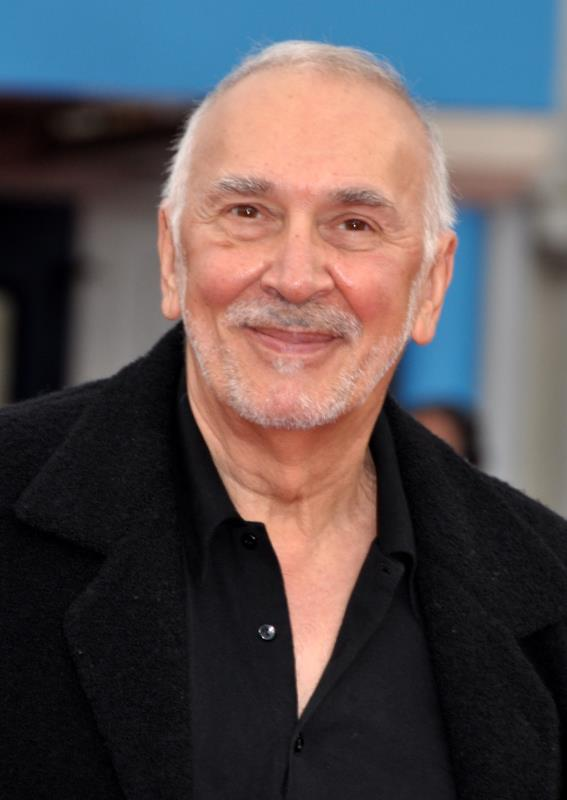
Frank Langella, who plays KGB handler Gabriel

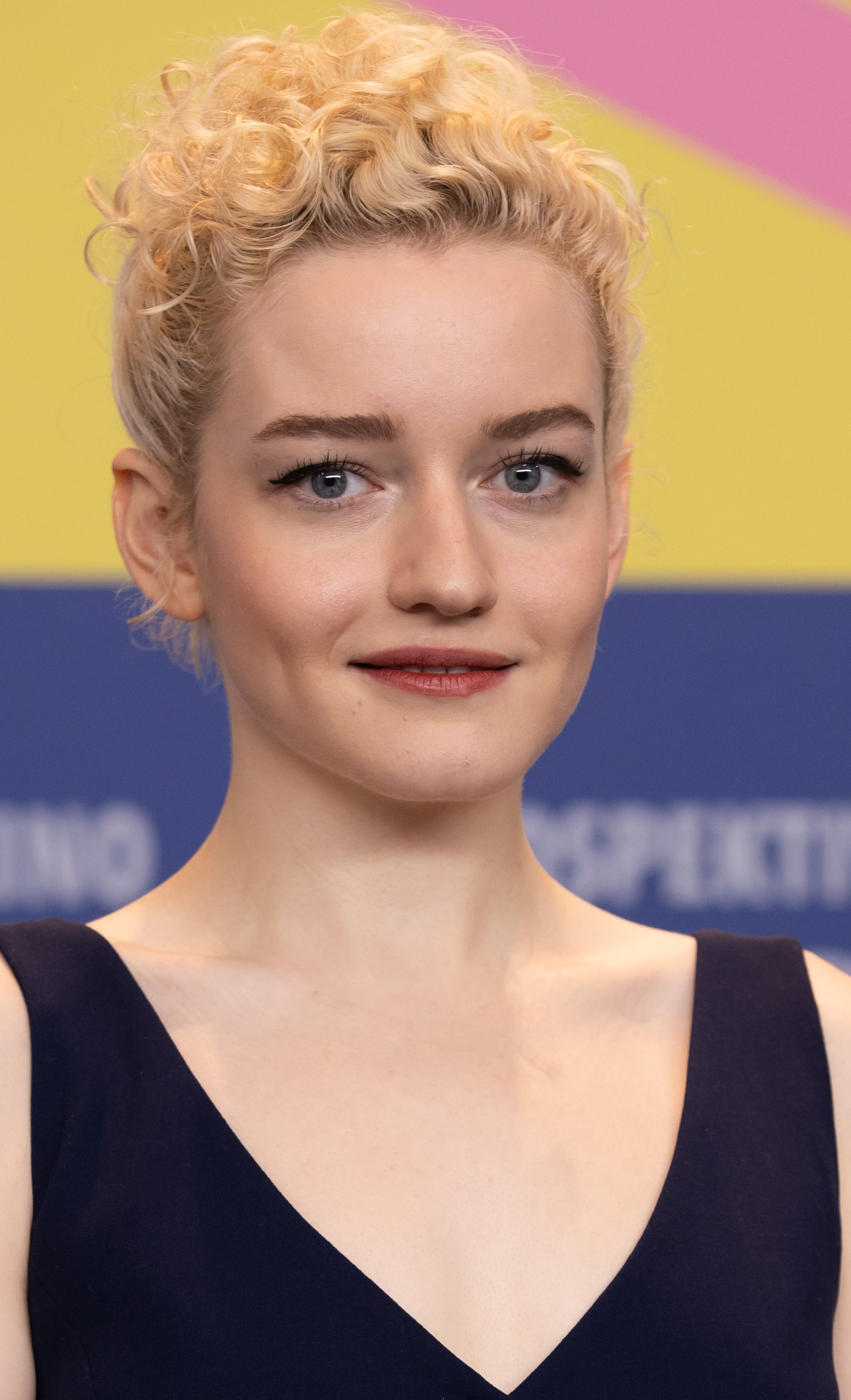
Julia Garner, who plays Kimmy Breland

- Daniel Flaherty as Matthew Beeman (seasons 1–5), Stan and Sandra's son
- Peter Von Berg as Vasili Nikolaevich (seasons 1–4), a former KGB Rezident
- Derek Luke as Gregory Thomas (season 1; special appearance season 6), an American militant and Elizabeth's longtime lover
- Wrenn Schmidt as Kate (season 2), the Jenningses' third KGB handler
- Lee Tergesen as Andrew Larrick (season 2), a United States Navy SEAL blackmailed into working for the KGB
- Michael Aronov as Anton Baklanov (seasons 2–4), an émigré Russian-Jewish scientist working on secret stealth technology
- Karen Pittman as Lisa (seasons 2–4), a Northrop employee from whom Elizabeth is gleaning information
- Kelly AuCoin as Pastor Tim (seasons 2–6), a pastor who heads the church which Paige Jennings attends
- Frank Langella as Gabriel (seasons 3–5), the Jenningses' first and fourth KGB handler
- Vera Cherny as Tatiana Evgenyevna Vyazemtseva (seasons 3–6), a KGB officer at the Rezidentura
- Peter Mark Kendall as Hans (seasons 3–5), a South African member of the Jenningses' operational team
- Julia Garner as Kimberly "Kimmy" Breland (seasons 3–6), the daughter of the head of the CIA's Afghan group, later head of the Soviet Division
- Laurie Holden as Renee (seasons 5–6), Stan's girlfriend and later wife
- Scott Cohen as Glenn Haskard (season 6), a member of a State Department negotiating team
- Miriam Shor as Erica Haskard (season 6), the ailing wife of Glenn Haskard for whom Elizabeth works as a home nurse and who coerces Elizabeth into art therapy

== Production ==
=== Concept ===
The Americans, a period piece set during the Reagan administration, was outlined by series creator Joe Weisberg, a former CIA officer. The series focuses on the personal and professional lives of the Jennings family—a married couple of Soviet deep-cover agents placed in the Washington, D.C. area in the 1960s and their initially unsuspecting, American-born children. The story picks up in the early 1980s. The show's creator has described the series as being focused on the personal, despite its political content: "International relations is just an allegory for the human relations. Sometimes, when you're struggling in your marriage or with your kid, it feels like life or death. For Philip and Elizabeth, it often is." Joel Fields, the other executive producer, described the series as working different levels of reality: the fictional world of the marriage between Philip and Elizabeth, and the real world involving the characters' experiences during the Cold War.

In 2007, after leaving the CIA, Weisberg published An Ordinary Spy, a novel about a spy who is completing the final stages of his training in Virginia and is being transferred overseas. After reading Weisberg's novel, executive producer Graham Yost discovered that Weisberg had also written a pilot for a possible spy series. Yost read the pilot and discovered that it was "annoyingly good", which led to developing the show.

Weisberg says the CIA inadvertently gave him the idea for a series about spies, explaining, "While I was taking the polygraph exam to get in, they asked the question, 'Are you joining the CIA in order to gain experience about the intelligence community so that you can write about it later'—which had never occurred to me. I was totally joining the CIA because I wanted to be a spy. But the second they asked that question ... then I thought, 'Now I'm going to fail the test.'" The job at the CIA, which Weisberg later described as a mistake, has helped him develop several storylines in the series, basing some plot lines on real-life stories. He stated:

The most interesting thing I observed during my time at the CIA was the family life of agents who served abroad with kids and spouses. The reality is that mostly they're just people going about their lives. The job is one element, and trying to depict the issues they face just seemed like something that, if we could bring it to television in a realistic way, would be new.

Weisberg was partially influenced to write a pilot script for the series by the 2010 events of the Illegals Program. His research material included notes on the KGB's Cold War left by Vasili Mitrokhin and conversations with some of his former colleagues at the CIA. However, in a departure from the circumstances involving the Illegals Program, he said he opted to set the story in the early 1980s because "a modern day [setting] didn't seem like a good idea", adding, "People were both shocked and simultaneously shrugged at the [2010] scandal because it didn't seem like we were really enemies with Russia anymore. An obvious way to remedy that for television was to stick it back in the Cold War." In a 2017 interview, Weisberg said that the show tried hard to resist the influence of the current political climate: "What you don't want is for people watching the show and thinking 'Oh, those clever writers, they did little things here and there that have to do with Donald Trump or what's going on with Russia today'".

=== Casting ===
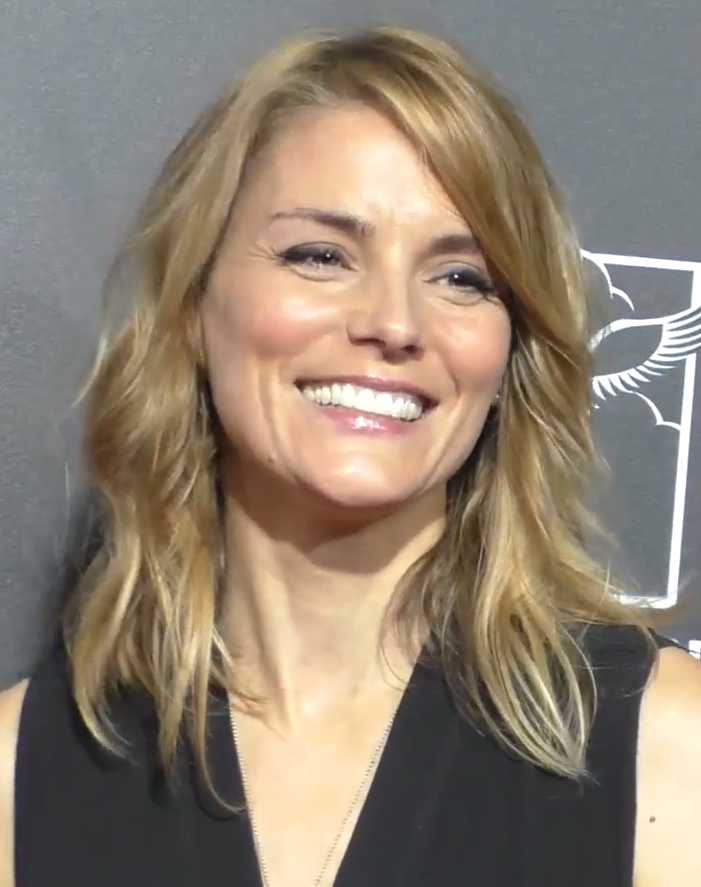
Susan Misner, who plays Sandra Beeman

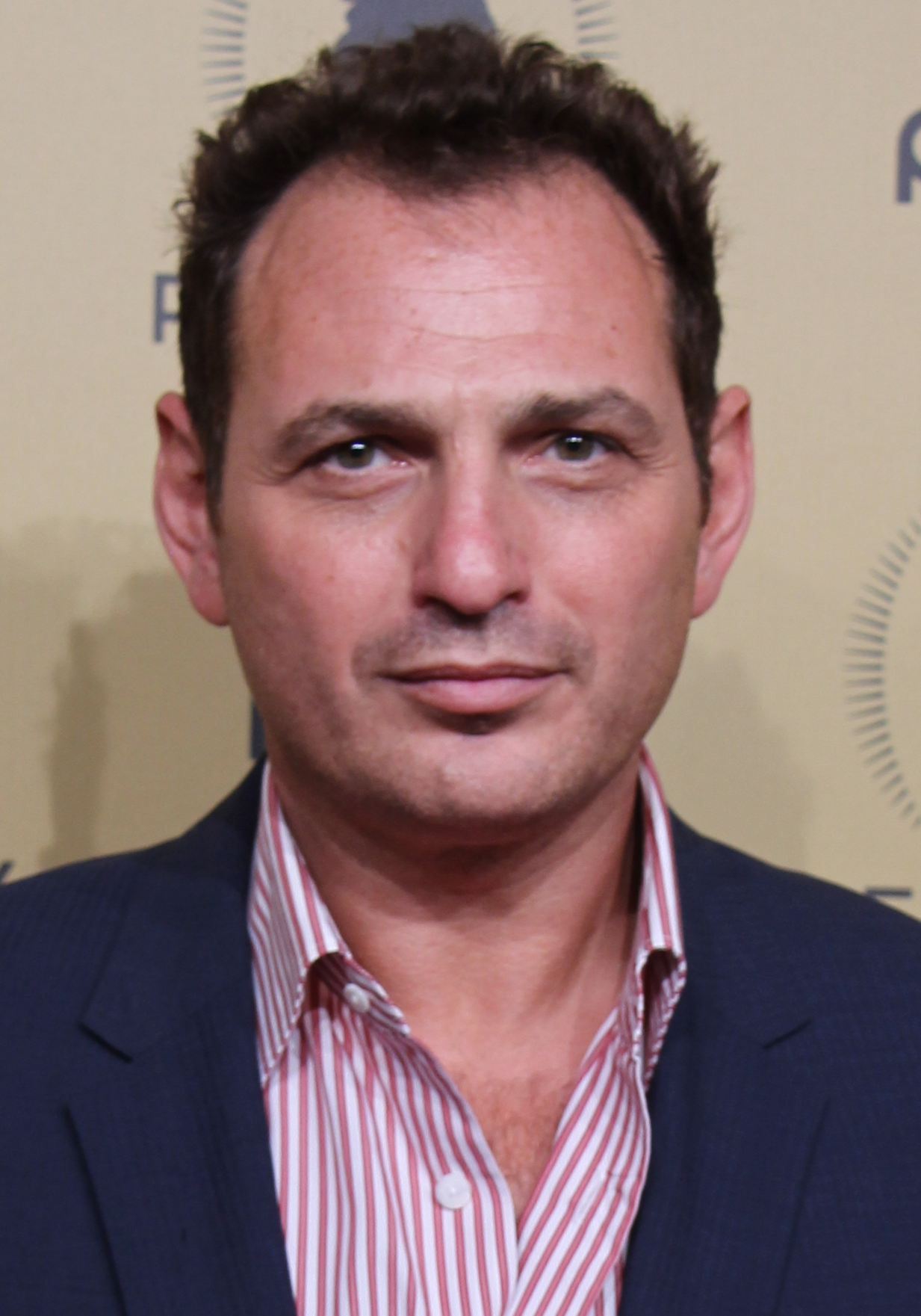
Lev Gorn, who plays Arkady Ivanovich

Weisberg said he had no idea about who would star in the series before casting began. FX president John Landgraf had the idea to cast Keri Russell in the series. Leslie Feldman, the head of casting at DreamWorks, saw Matthew Rhys in a play and suggested him to Weisberg. Russell and Rhys had met briefly at a party years before, but were not fully introduced. They both were attracted to the series because of its focus on the relationship between their characters. Rhys said, "You have two people who have led the most incredibly strange life together with incredibly high stakes, in this scene of domesticity that is an absolute lie, and at the end of the pilot they're finding each other for the very first time."

Russell described the pilot script as "interesting", continuing, "It was so far from a procedural. And [originally,] I didn't know that I wanted to do it... I never want to do anything. But I just couldn't stop thinking about it." Rhys said of his character, "When you meet him, he's at this great turning point in his life where everything's changing for him... It's the full package for an actor. It's a dream."

Noah Emmerich was initially hesitant about taking a role in the series. He explained: "The truth is, from the very beginning, I thought, 'I don't want to do a TV show where I carry a gun or a badge. I'm done with guns and badges. I just don't want to do that anymore.' When I first read it I thought, 'Yeah, it's really interesting and really good, but I don't want to be an FBI guy.'" His friend, Gavin O'Connor, who directed the pilot episode, convinced him to take a closer look at the role. Emmerich stated that he responded to the aspect of marriage and family.

After recurring in the first season, Susan Misner, Annet Mahendru, and Alison Wright, who play Sandra Beeman, Nina Krilova, and Martha Hanson, respectively, were promoted to series regulars beginning with season two. After recurring in the first two seasons, Lev Gorn, who plays Arkady Ivanovich, was promoted to series regular for season three.

=== Writing ===
Weisberg wrote the first two episodes of the series. Landgraf, who did not know Weisberg but liked the series, suggested to Weisberg that he work alongside Joel Fields as co-showrunner and the other head writer. Fields, in turn, persuaded TV writer Joshua Brand, with whom he had been working on a new pilot, to join the show's writing team as consulting producer shortly after the start; between them, Weisberg, Fields, and Brand wrote or co-wrote ten of the first season's thirteen episodes. In the second season, Gibson wrote one episode, and the show added other producers to the writing team: screenwriter and journalist Stephen Schiff, playwright and children's book author Peter Ackerman, and playwright Tracey Scott Wilson. All six of those writers (Weisberg, Fields, Brand, Schiff, Ackerman, and Wilson) remained with the show throughout its run. In addition, playwright and Americans story editor Hilary Bettis was added to the writing staff in season 5, and Americans script coordinator Justin Weinberger and showrunner's assistant Sarah Nolen were added to the writing staff in the sixth and final season.

=== Use of Russian language ===
The main characters of the show, despite being Soviet KGB officers, have to behave as American-born citizens, and therefore do not generally speak Russian on-screen. Other Soviet agents, immigrants, and—later in the show—ordinary Soviet people converse in Russian. Joe Weisberg explained that achieving believable Russian pronunciation was very important because the show was "so much centered on the world of the Russian Russians and the Russian illegals". In most cases, Russian was the native language for the actors playing Soviet characters. Other actors mastered their lines to sound almost native. Peter von Berg, cast as Vasili Nikolayevich, brought his expertise in Russian theater and skills as an accent coach to the role. Annet Mahendru, who portrayed Nina, has a Russian mother and is multilingual, speaking six languages. Mahendru praised Matthew Rhys for his efforts in delivering a few phrases in Russian, adding: "It's really important to everyone, so they're all trying, but it's a difficult language for all of us — even those of us who are fluent in it!"

Weisberg underscored the importance of the authenticity. According to him, there were "some perfectly good people [in the Rezidentura] who were easy to relate to even if you didn't believe in the cause they were serving". He concluded: "Once you bring that level of detail into a show, you can't do cardboard cutouts anymore. You're not in the realm of cliché. You will invariably build a real person."

=== Filming and locations ===
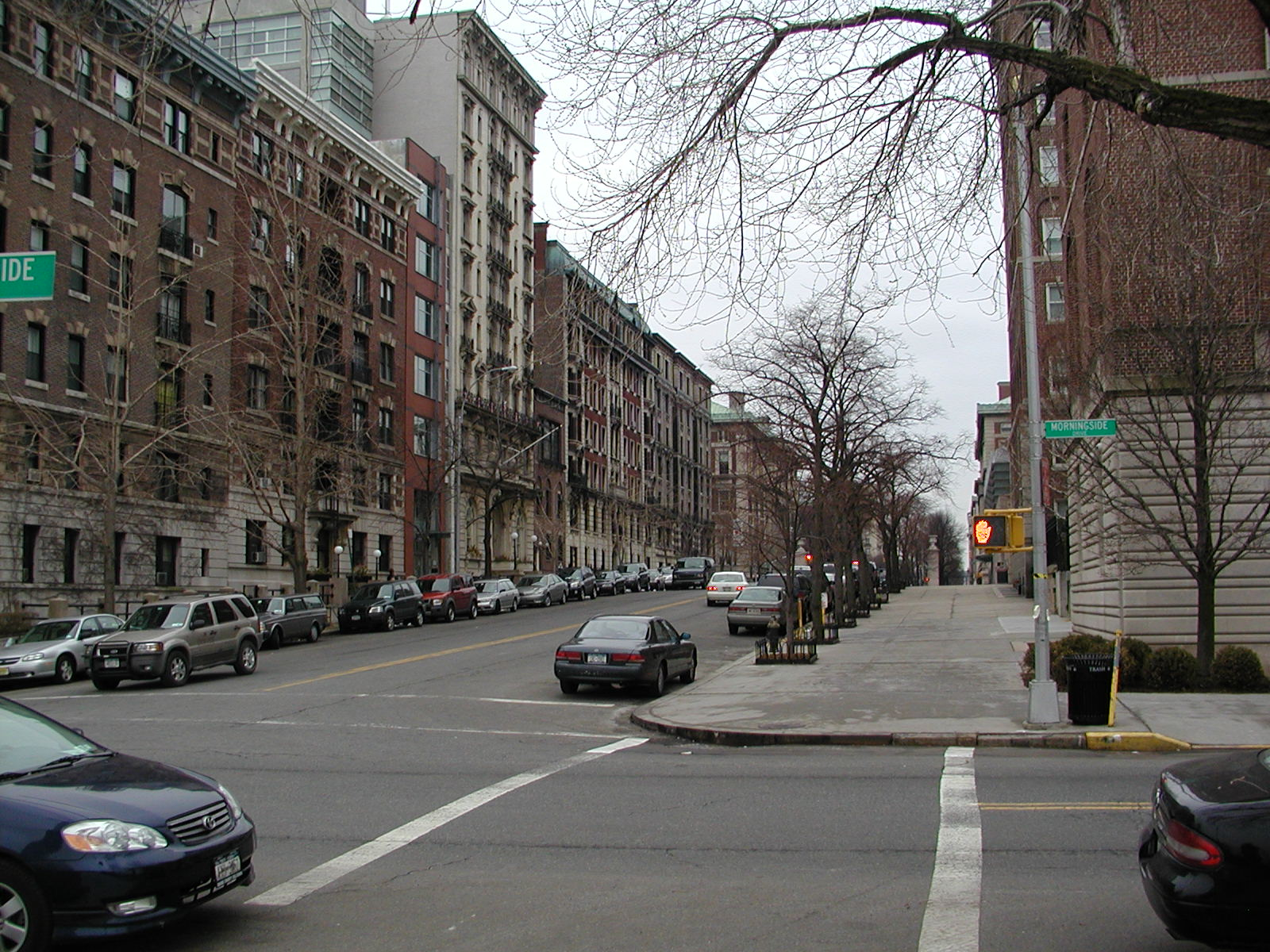
West 116th Street in Morningside, a filming location

The series filmed in New York City at Eastern Effects Studios in Gowanus, Brooklyn, with Brooklyn street locations in Boerum Hill, Carroll Gardens and Cobble Hill. Other shooting locations included: Prospect Park, Astoria, Washington Heights, Mamaroneck, Coney Island Avenue, Kew Gardens, Morningside Heights, Farmingdale, and Staten Island. Shooting of the pilot episode began in May 2012 and lasted until mid-June. Filming began for the rest of the first season in November 2012 in the New York City area. The production used location shots to simulate a dramatic setting of Washington, D.C. Early filming was delayed by flooding caused by Hurricane Sandy. Filming for the second season commenced in October 2013. Some scenes in the fifth and sixth seasons were filmed in Moscow.

== Release ==
=== Broadcast ===
The Americans aired internationally in Australia on Network Ten, Canada on FX Canada, Ireland on RTÉ Two, and the United Kingdom on ITV. ITV dropped the series in January 2015 and did not acquire the third season. On July 20, 2015, ITV acquired seasons three and four for their subscription channel ITV Encore.

== Reception ==
=== Critical response ===
Critical response of The Americans
Season	Rotten Tomatoes	Metacritic
1	88% (58 reviews)	78 (35 reviews)
2	97% (38 reviews)	88 (31 reviews)
3	100% (53 reviews)	92 (23 reviews)
4	99% (248 reviews)	95 (28 reviews)
5	94% (216 reviews)	94 (19 reviews)
6	99% (199 reviews)	92 (18 reviews)

Over the course of its run, the series received widespread critical acclaim. The American Film Institute listed The Americans as one of the top ten television series of 2013, 2014, 2015, 2016, and 2018.

After it ended its six-season run, Tim Goodman from The Hollywood Reporter considered The Americans to be among the "Hall of Fame" dramas, and stated it was one of his top five favorite television dramas of all-time. IndieWire and Paste named it the best FX TV series of all-time. The New York Times named the series one of the best 20 TV dramas since The Sopranos, while Vice called it "The Sopranos of this decade". In September 2019, The Guardian ranked the show 43rd on its list of the 100 best TV shows of the 21st century, stating that the "gorgeous, slow-burning drama" was "terminally overlooked in favour of flashier, flimsier fare". In September 2022, Rolling Stone ranked the show 14th on its list of the 100 greatest TV shows of all time.

==== Season 1 ====
The first season of The Americans received positive reviews from critics. On Rotten Tomatoes, it received an 88 percent approval rating with an average score of 7.9 out of 10 based on 58 reviews, with a critics' consensus of: "The Americans is a spy thriller of the highest order, with evocative period touches and strong chemistry between its leads." Metacritic scored the show a 78 out of 100 based on 35 reviews, indicating "generally favorable reviews". David Hinkley of the New York Daily News praised the pace, noting that "It's a premise that requires as much clever dramatic footwork as you might expect, and creator Joe Weisberg, a former CIA agent, handles the challenge". Verne Gay of Newsday called it a "smart newcomer with a pair of leads that turns The Americans into a likely winner" and gave it a grade of an "A−". Some reviews were not as optimistic. The Washington Post was cautious in its outlook, stating "it's easy to see how stale it might get in a matter of episodes." Variety, while finding the concept "intriguing and provocative", ultimately concluded that "[t]he execution ... isn't worthy of the premise".

==== Season 2 ====
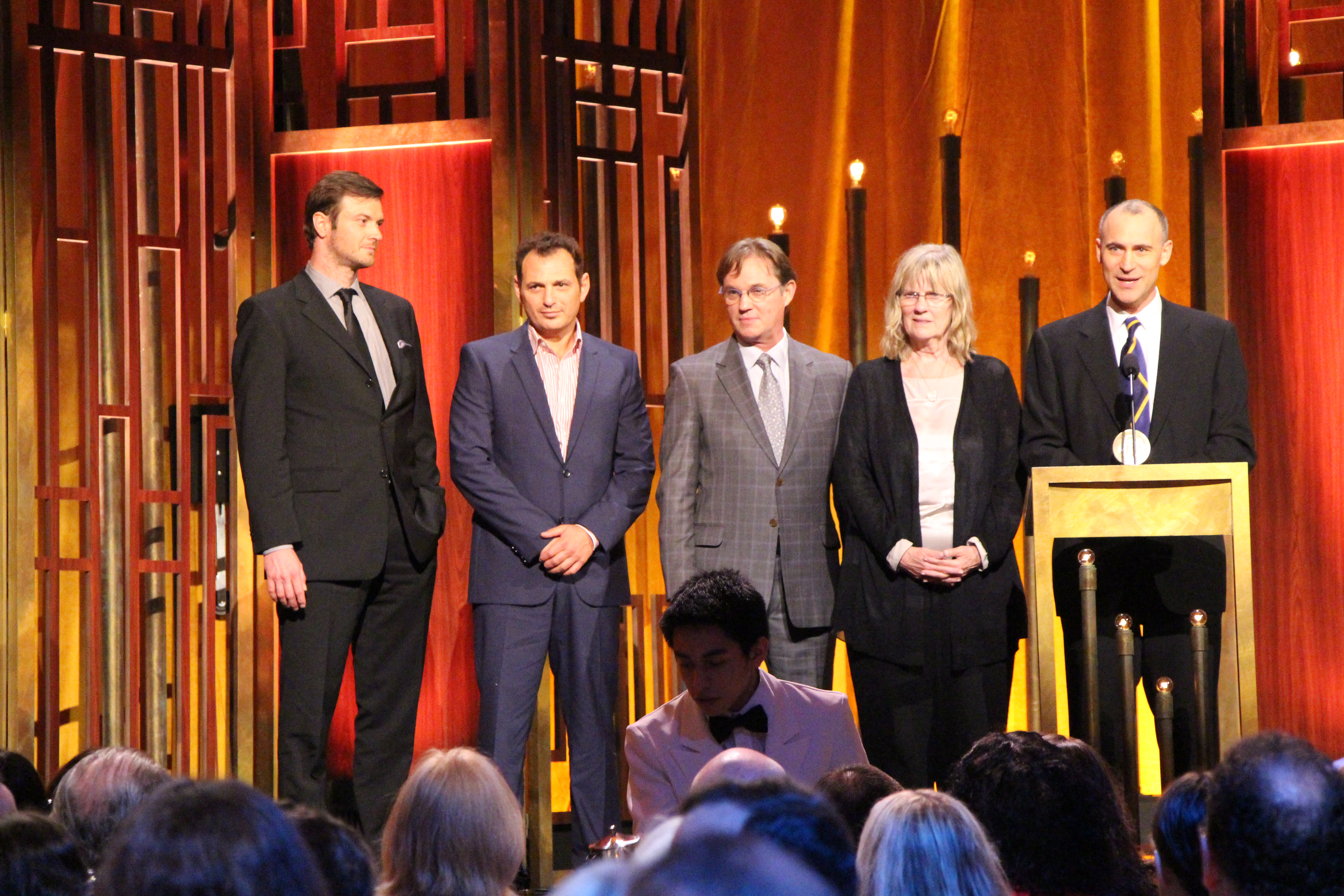
Members of the cast and crew at the 74th Annual Peabody Awards

The second season received critical acclaim. On Rotten Tomatoes, it received a 97 percent approval rating with an average score of 8.8 out of 10 based on 38 reviews, with a critics consensus of: "Adding fuel to the fire, The Americans retains all the suspense and action of season one while enhancing the level of excitement... and wigs." Metacritic scored the show an 88 out of 100 based on 31 reviews, indicating "universal acclaim". Several entities have rated the show among the best television for 2014, including the American Film Institute, The A.V. Club, and Grantland.

Tim Goodman of The Hollywood Reporter called the series "one of television's finest dramas" and praised the ability of the writers in "nailing down season two ... by picking up where the story left off and making sure that this spy-vs.-spy thing has real-life costs". Rob Owen of the Pittsburgh Post-Gazette praised the series for doing "the near-impossible of making viewers cheer for Russian spies in America and at the same time for the American FBI agents who are trying to unmask those Russians living in suburbia". The New York Daily News questioned its survivability: "Credibility starts to fray when our heroes, or anti-heroes, keep needing miraculous last-second evasions and escapes."

==== Season 3 ====
On Rotten Tomatoes, the third season received a 100% approval rating with an average score of 9 out of 10 based on 53 reviews, with a critics consensus of: "Family-driven drama and psychological themes propel The Americans' tautly drawn tension, dispensing thrills of a different ilk this season." Metacritic lists a score of 92 out of 100 based on 23 reviews, indicating "universal acclaim". Alessandra Stanley's review in The New York Times states that, "'The Americans' is an unusually clever, subtle drama that uses the conventions of a Cold War thriller to paint a portrait of a complicated, evolving but not unhappy marriage...[E]very season gets more complicated, and is all the better for it." Maureen Ryan of The Huffington Post declared that the first four episodes were "every bit as taut and finely crafted as the stellar prior season of the show". Emily VanDerWerff of Vox said "The Americans is in the kind of incredible stretch of episodes TV dramas sometimes hit in the middle of their runs" and that it is "on one of the best runs of episodes in TV drama history".

==== Season 4 ====
The fourth season received widespread acclaim from critics. On Rotten Tomatoes, it received a 99% approval rating with an average score of 9.2 out of 10 based on 248 reviews, with a critics consensus of: "With its fourth season, The Americans continues to deliver top-tier spy drama while sending its characters in directions that threaten to destroy their freedoms—and their lives." On Metacritic, the season has a score of 95 out of 100 based on 28 reviews, indicating "universal acclaim". Brian Tallerico of RogerEbert.com praised the series and wrote, "It is that depth of character and nuance in the writing that elevates The Americans, along with its willingness to offer stunning narrative developments. [...] I'm now convinced that when we close the final chapter of this televised novel we may finally appreciate one of the best shows we've ever seen." James Poniewozik of The New York Times characterized the fourth season as a melancholy "catalog of loss", which adds "a note of gloom even to the tensest moments in this drama".

==== Season 5 ====
On Rotten Tomatoes, season five received a 94% approval rating with an average score of 9 out of 10 based on 216 reviews, with a critics' consensus of: "In its penultimate season, The Americans brings long-simmering storylines to a boil while heightening the spy-thriller stakes and deepening the domestic drama—all brought vividly to life by superb performances from its veteran cast." On Metacritic, the season has a score of 94 out of 100 based on 19 reviews, indicating "universal acclaim". Matthew Gilbert of The Boston Globe gave it a highly positive review and wrote, "The drama remains as tense as ever, with strong, careful writing and an abundance of fine performances." Tim Goodman of The Hollywood Reporter also lauded the series, "It's extremely well-constructed, with slow-burning storylines that are paying off in superb dramatic depth" and praised its "top-tier acting" and "artfully crafted visuals". As the season progressed, some criticized it for being too slow. Showrunners Weisberg and Fields admitted that they did not expect "this much of a backlash" for "hitting the brakes too hard". They were upset by the criticism but suggested viewers wait until the series was over, hoping for the response to become more muted in context of the sixth and the final season. After the series ended, Travis Clark of Business Insider said the end of the series made him reconsider and appreciate what he initially thought was the weakest and most disappointing season of the show.

==== Season 6 ====
On Rotten Tomatoes, the sixth season received a 99% approval rating with an average score of 9.3 out of 10 based on 199 reviews, with a critics consensus of: "The Americans' powerful final season pumps up the volume on an already intense show, concluding the complex series arc with epic familial conflict ... and a high body count." On Metacritic, the season has a score of 92 out of 100 based on 18 reviews, indicating "universal acclaim". Vox's Emily VanDerWerff named it one of the best final seasons ever made. Matt Brennan from Paste echoed the sentiment: "The Americans to its most consequential moment, and in the midst of a final season that so far deserves consideration alongside Breaking Bad's, The Sopranos', and a handful of others' as the medium's all-time best." The series finale, "START", was critically acclaimed as one of the best finales of all time.

=== Themes ===
The Americans explores complex themes of loyalty, identity, and morality, often framing these issues within the context of Cold War espionage and family dynamics. Central to the series is the marriage of Philip and Elizabeth Jennings, who struggle with their Soviet loyalty and Philip's affinity for American culture. The show's creator, Joe Weisberg, a former CIA officer, has described it as "essentially about a marriage", using international espionage as a metaphor for the personal secrets and conflicts within relationships. Scholars Hopf and Creighton have argued that the metaphor works both ways, with the series using the Jenningses' marriage to personalize the Cold War. The course of Philip and Stan's friendship, with its complexities and betrayals, is compared to the development and breakup of a marriage.

Another recurring theme is the conflict between personal morality and duty to one's country. Philip and Elizabeth often confront moral dilemmas that put their sense of duty at odds with their compassion, especially in their interactions with their children and American neighbors. This tension is heightened by the show's historical setting in the early 1980s, a time marked by political polarization and heightened nuclear tensions between the United States and the Soviet Union. Parenthood also emerges as a central theme, as Philip and Elizabeth grapple with the challenges of raising their children while maintaining their cover. Smita Rahan of Johns Hopkins University has argued that the series portrays motherhood as an effectively corrupting influence. The strain of their double lives forces them to make difficult choices that affect their family's future.

=== Accolades ===
Over the course of the series, The Americans received 18 Emmy nominations. For its fourth and sixth seasons, the series was nominated for Outstanding Drama Series. Keri Russell and Matthew Rhys were each nominated for Outstanding Lead Actress and Actor in a Drama Series, respectively, for the last three seasons. Rhys won the award for the sixth season. The prior omissions that the show had received at the Emmys were considered to be snubs by the Emmys in the drama and acting categories by critics. Margo Martindale was nominated four times and won twice for Outstanding Guest Actress in a Drama Series, and Alison Wright received a nomination in the same category for the fifth season. The show received four nominations for Outstanding Writing for a Drama Series, for "Do Mail Robots Dream of Electric Sheep?" written by Joshua Brand; and Joel Fields and Joe Weisberg were nominated for the award three consecutive years for the fourth, fifth, and sixth-season finales. Fields and Weisberg won the award for the series finale, "START". Nathan Barr also received a nomination for Outstanding Original Main Title Theme Music for the first season.

The Americans was strongly praised for its writing. The series was nominated for four Writers Guild of America Award for Television: Dramatic Series awards, and won in both 2016 and 2018. The Americans won a rare second Peabody Award, "for ending one of TV's best dramas with one of the television's best series finales", becoming the first drama series since Breaking Bad to win two Peabody Awards during its run.

== Adaptations ==
In June 2025, it was announced that a South Korean remake of the series under the working title The Koreans (Korean: 코리언즈; RR: Korieonjeu) was in development. Directed by Ahn Gil-ho and starring Lee Byung-hun, the adaptation will reimagine the story of North Korean sleeper agents during the era of South Korea's military dictatorship in the 1980s.

== See also ==
- Deutschland 83 – 2015 German television series
- Illegals Program – Ten Russian sleeper agents under non-official cover arrested in 2010 by the FBI
- Jack Barsky – Former KGB sleeper agent
