= CIA activities in the Soviet Union =

With Europe stabilizing along the Iron Curtain, the CIA attempted to limit the spread of Soviet influence elsewhere around the world. Much of the basic model came from George Kennan's "containment" strategy from 1947, a foundation of US policy for decades.

== Soviet Union 1950 ==
=== Intelligence analysis ===
In December 1950, with the Korean War in progress, National Intelligence Estimate 15 was issued: "Probable Soviet Moves to Exploit the Present Situation". It began with the estimate that "USSR-Satellite treatment of Korean developments, k, indicates that they assess their current military and political position as one of great strength in comparison with that of the West, and that they propose to exploit the apparent conviction of the West of its own present weakness." At this time, there was no assumption that China and the Soviet Union would differ on any policy "Moscow, seconded by Peiping with regard to the Far East, has disclosed through a series of authoritative statements that it aims to achieve certain gains in the present situation:

a. Withdrawal of UN forces from Korea and of the Seventh Fleet from Formosan waters.
b. Establishment of Communist China as the predominant power in the Far East, including the seating of Communist China in the United Nations.
c.Reduction of Western control over Japan as a step toward its eventual elimination.
d. Prevention of West German rearmament.

It can be anticipated that irrespective of any Western moves looking toward negotiations, assuming virtual Western surrender is not involved, the Kremlin plans a continuation of Chinese Communist pressure in Korea until the military defeat of the UN is complete. A determined and successful stand by UN forces in Korea would, of course, require a Soviet re-estimate of the situation.

Such a stand did take place, and the war ended in a stalemate.

The scope of Soviet bloc preparations and the nature and extent of Soviet Communist official statements and propaganda raise the' question of Soviet or Satellite moves in other areas. The points that appear most critical are Berlin and Germany, Indochina, Yugoslavia, and Iran.

Regarding what was to become Vietnam:

An intensification of Communist efforts to secure Indochina is to be expected, regardless of development elsewhere. The Viet Minh has clearly indicated that its objective is to drive the French from Indochina at the earliest possible date. The Chinese Communists have at the same time repeatedly expressed their support of the Viet Minh. They have, moreover, officially claimed that Western resistance to the Viet Mmli is directed against Chinese Communist security. The Chinese Communists are already furnishing the Viet Minh with material, training, and technical assistance. If this assistance proves inadequate to enable the Viet Minh to accomplish its objectives, it is estimated that it will be supplemented, as necessary, by the introduction of Chinese Communist forces into the conflict, possibly as "volunteers." The extent of this Chinese Communist intervention, and whether it takes overt form, will probably depend on the degree of outside assistance furnished the French and the extent of Chinese Communist commitments elsewhere.

== Soviet Union 1952 ==
In operation HTLINGUAL, the CIA intercepts mail from the U.S. to the Soviet Union, from 1952 to 1973. See also Family Jewels (Central Intelligence Agency).

== Soviet Union 1953 ==
=== Intelligence analysis ===
A March 1953 report on what was known about the Soviet bloc bluntly said that the level of confidence ranged greatly; some things were known with firmness and accuracy, while other information ranged from inadequate to nonexistent. In particular, "We have no reliable inside intelligence on the thinking inside the Kremlin." Balancing this was high confidence on the information about the Soviet Navy. Current intelligence, supporting military operations in Korea was considered excellent.

There was reasonable confidence in knowing the size of the Soviet fission bomb inventory, but much less confidence about estimates of the biological and chemical warfare capabilities. The report observed, however, that a good deal of information could be derived from knowledge of Soviet science in disciplines that supported biological and chemical warfare. Concern was expressed about knowledge of their progress of their thermonuclear weapon development program Joe-4, their first test, took place in August of the same year and their rate of uranium 235 production.

While the CIA was confident on its knowledge of Soviet electronic warfare capabilities, there were gaps in the knowledge about the electronic order of battle in the Soviet air defense network. Information on missiles was also weak, and some was simply extrapolation of German technology the Soviets were known to have captured.

As far as economic intelligence, the highest confidence was in basic industry output, as with metals, petroleum and transportation. It was observed that Soviet official announcements in these areas tended to be true. Data on agriculture and highly technical industries was weak. With respect to parts of the Soviet Bloc, the information on East Germany was thought best, fair on Poland, and worst on China.

Military intelligence was good on land and sea forces, but there were gaps in coverage of air capabilities. Knowledge of their strategic intentions was "practically nonexistent", and not thought likely to improve.

== Soviet Union 1954 ==
=== Intelligence analysis ===
While the 1953 survey said that there was little knowledge about thinking inside the Kremlin, a 1954 NIE on soviet strategy stated substantial confidence in the stability of the Soviet government under its new leadership. Joseph Stalin had died in March 1953. China was described as more of an ally than a satellite.

Economic growth was seen to be slowing, with agriculture the weakest component. The overall size of the military was expected to stay the same, but to improve in efficiency with greater numbers of nuclear weapons, missiles, and jet aircraft. The level of training, especially for strategic mobility, was considered weak.

It was expected that both the Soviets and Chinese would avoid general war, unless critical interests were at stake. They will, however, put great emphasis on weakening and destabilizing non-Communist nations, and reducing those states' commitment to the West. Slowing German and Japanese rearmament is a priority, while they rearm the satellites.

They will consider supporting anticolonialist and nationalist movements. The Intelligence Community believes their area of greatest interest will be Southeast Asia, although they probably will not insert Chinese Communist regular troops.

=== Covert action ===
The US considered Guatemala, and the coup there, an important proxy engagement with the Soviet Union. The CIA has declassified 5210 documents on Guatemala. Analyzing these documents will be necessary to fully understand how the Guatemalan operation fit into the broader Cold War context.

Gen. James Doolittle did an extensive report on covert actions, specifically for President Dwight D. Eisenhower. The report's first recommendation dealt with personnel. It recommended releasing a large number of current staff that could never be more than mediocre, aggressively recruit new staff with an overall goal of increasing the workforce, and intensify training, with 10% of the covert staff time spent in training. The Director should be nonpolitical.

=== Counterintelligence ===
Security was the next concern, starting with a drive to reduce interim and provisional security clearances. The report strongly endorsed use of the polygraph both for initial recruits and existing staff. Counterespionage needed to be strengthened, and field stations needed both to report on their staff and periodically be inspected. Consolidating the Washington workforce, which was scattered among buildings, into one or a few main buildings was seen as a way of improving the security of classified information.

=== Management, coordination and oversight ===
Coordination in the intelligence community was seen as a problem, with one of the highest priorities being establishing clear understandings between CIA and military intelligence organizations. The overall IC program for eliciting information from defectors needed improvement, with contributions from multiple agencies. In general, information sharing in the IC needed to improve.

As far as organization and management, the report described the structure of the Directorate of Plans (i.e., the clandestine service) as too complex and in need of simplification. The Inspector General needed an agency-wide mandate. The role of the Operations Coordinating Board, the covert and clandestine oversight staff of the National Security Council needed to be strengthened, with operations clearly approved and guided from the highest levels of government.

The report addressed the classic problem of increasing performance while reducing costs. This meant better review of the budgets of covert and clandestine activities by a Review Board, except for the most sensitive operations. It meant providing the Comptroller with enough information, even if sanitized, to do a thorough job.

== Soviet Union 1956 ==
=== Clandestine intelligence collection ===
The Soviets put down a revolution in Hungary, using considerable force. There was one CIA case officer in Hungary, which greatly limited collection capability.

The U-2 high-altitude reconnaissance aircraft, codenamed AQUATONE, began overflights of the Soviet Union.

== Soviet Union 1958 ==
=== Intelligence estimate ===
Following the Hungarian Revolution in 1956, the USSR put increased pressure on its satellite countries, and made it clear to the West that it did not want interference. This 1958 estimate by the IC, under CIA, explored the US understanding of the Soviet policy and actions.

We believe the basic motivation behind Moscow's current tough line to be its grave concern over its power position in Eastern Europe, where it considers revisionism to have developed to dangerous proportions/Note 1. This concern has led the USSR to attack Tito [of Yugoslavia] and to cause the execution of Imre Nagy [the rebel Hungarian leader]--measures intended, at least in part, to put pressure on Gomulka [leader of Poland]. We believe that the Soviets will exert greater efforts to obtain Gomulka's compliance with Bloc requirements or, failing that, perhaps even to replace him.

The analysts felt the USSR has not abandoned the idea of peaceful coexistence with the West, but it probably believes there is little chance for East-West negotiations favorable to it. If, however, these events reflect " differences within the Soviet leadership and a degree of Communist Chinese influence. If this is so, it may portend a new and stiffer policy towards the West as well as the Satellites.

We believe that recent events do not indicate that the USSR has ceased to desire a conference at the summit or lower level negotiations on matters in which the Soviet leaders have an interest. At the same time, the Soviet leaders may have concluded prior to undertaking their recent moves that, since the chances of an early summit conference on their terms were waning, they could more easily accept the political losses they would suffer in international affairs by pursuing a harder policy in Eastern Europe.

== Soviet Union 1959 ==
=== Clandestine intelligence collection ===
GRU officer Dmitri Polyakov walked in to offer his services to the US. He transmitted information to the US until his retirement, as a Soviet general in 1980, although he was compromised in 1986, probably by Aldrich Ames, and executed in 1988.

=== Intelligence estimation and clandestine collection ===
A November 1959 NIE, with the benefit of U-2 imagery, identified Soviet ground-to-ground missile capabilities from 75 nmi to intercontinental range. The ICBM, with a CEP of 3 nmi, was expected to reach operational status in January 1960.

== Soviet Union 1960 ==
=== Covert action 1960 (history) ===
On the covert action front, a 1969 memorandum requesting 303 committee support of a covert action program against the Soviet Union. It is first mentioned here because it gives historical background of earlier activities

A request for additional funding for covert action, written in 1969 (see below), reviewed prior covert action in the Soviet Union. In accordance with a previous authorization, NSC 5502/1, as revalidated on 10 November 1960, CIA sponsors a covert action program which supports media3 and contact activities aimed at stimulating and sustaining pressures for liberalization and evolutionary change from within the Soviet Union.

=== 1960 U-2 incident (clandestine intelligence collection) ===
On May 1, 1960, a U-2 reconnaissance aircraft, operated by the CIA was shot down over the USSR, and its pilot, Francis Gary Powers, captured. At first, the CIA claimed it was a lost weather plane.

In speaking with President Dwight D. Eisenhower, Director of Central Intelligence Allen W. Dulles said that Powers, the U-2 pilot,

had been with CIA four years and before that had been with the Air Force for six years. He had been selected for this mission because of his knowledge of Arctic navigation. The President said that when reconnaissance over-flights had been explained to him, he had been told that the pilots on such flights were taught to destroy the plane rather than to let it fall into Soviet hands. The President believed that the blunder of our first statement...[assumed] the plane was destroyed, Accordingly, we thought the story that a NASA weather reconnaissance plane was missing was a good cover story.

Later in May, the President met with Congressional leaders. During that breakfast discussion, he said,

that intelligence and espionage were distasteful for many Americans, but that he as President ... had to make decisions based on what was right for the United States concerning the fundamental intelligence knowledge that we had to have...Nevertheless, the President has to accept responsibility for these decisions and also keep the knowledge of such activities in the fewest possible hands. Only a few people in State, Defense and CIA knew of this... The President said that he was responsible for the directive for the U-2... "There is no glory in this business," he said. "If it is successful, it can't be told."

Eisenhower expressed concern that Congress "would try to dig into the interior of the CIA and its covert operation. Such attempt would be harmful to the United States and he was sure that the leaders of the Congress would realize this. He repeated that the Administration people would cooperate with the inquiry--he called it "investigation" several times.

Senator Mike Mansfield asked "What would the President think if there were to be established in the Congress a joint Congressional Committee which would oversee the activities of the CIA?" Eisenhower objected

that the operation of the CIA was so delicate and so secret in many cases that it must be kept under cover, and that the Executive must be held responsible for it. He said that he would agree to some bipartisan group going down occasionally and receiving reports from the CIA on their activities, but that he would hate to see it formalized--indeed would be against the proposal made by Senator Mansfield.

Senator Richard B. Russell "said that they do have a Congressional group that periodically went over reports. He said that they knew the U-2 planes were under construction a long time ago. The Senator added that he was not afraid of the Senators on security matters but that he was afraid of staff leaks."

Charles E. Bohlen, special assistant to Secretary of State John Foster Dulles asked Menshikov about Soviet policy toward Cuba, with the response "he had said to Senator Fulbright that Senator Johnson's statement about a submarine base was completely out of this world and provocative; the Soviet Union had no intention of establishing bases or any military arrangements in Cuba."

== Soviet Union 1967 ==
In Operation Acoustic Kitty, the CIA attempted to eavesdrop on men in a park outside the Soviet embassy in Washington with a $20,000,000 cat. The fate of the cat remains disputed.

== Soviet Union 1969 ==
=== Authorization of covert action ===
A request for additional funding for covert action reviewed prior covert action in the Soviet Union. It asked for 303 Committee approval of continuation of the covert action program "directed primarily at the Soviet intelligentsia and reaffirm the approval it has given in the past to the program generally and the individual projects specifically."

The proposal mentioned "the program supports media and contact activities aimed at stimulating and sustaining pressures for liberalization and evolutionary change from within the Soviet Union." Media activities were approved separately, and executed by Radio Liberty Committee and Free Europe, Inc., were approved by higher authority on 22 February 1969 and outside this request's scope.

The Radio Liberty Committee, successor organization to the American Committee for Liberation from Bolshevism, is composed of three major divisions:

1. Radio Liberty which broadcasts via short wave to the Soviet Union 24 hours a day in 18 languages
2. a book publication and distribution program designed to provide Soviet citizens with books not normally accessible to the Soviet public;
3. [material not declassified] which produces research papers and publications targeted at the developing countries in Africa, the Middle East and the Far East. [material not declassified]

The total cost of this program is $766,000. The program as a whole was discussed with and endorsed by Deputy Assistant Secretary of State Swank and Soviet Union Country Director Dubs on 21 October and 6 November 1969. The individual projects had been approved by the 303 Committee in 1967 and 1968.

The primary objective is to stimulate and sustain pressures for liberalization and change from within the Soviet Union. The neuralgic points of this disaffection—desire for personal and intellectual freedom, desire for improvement in the quality of life, and the persistence of nationalism in Eastern Europe and among the nationality groups in the Soviet Union—are the main issues exploited by these projects. A secondary objective is to enlighten important third-country elites, especially political leaders and the public opinion shaping professions, about the repressive nature of the Soviet system and its imperialistic and self-aggrandizing foreign policy. The intellectual dissidence movement has demonstrated a vitality of its own. It is reasonable to assume that these dissidents will continue to seek outlets for literature and socio-political commentary that has thus far been suppressed. Each time the regime has silenced a group of dissidents a new group has emerged to produce a new generation of protest literature.

An alternative approach was stated

The United States could follow a policy of encouraging more vigorous émigré activities by more forthcoming identification by United States officials with émigré objectives, the extension of subsidies for émigré activities or organizations not presently receiving assistance from the United States Government, and adoption of a policy of open support for the independence of national minority areas such as the Ukraine. Substantial intensification of émigré propaganda activities might result in stimulating dissension inside the USSR, inducing defections and improving the collection of intelligence; identification with the independence of national minority groups could strengthen ethnic nationalist resistance to Russian domination.

On the other hand, a more vigorous emigration probably would strengthen the forces of conformity and repression would retard the process of evolution in popular and leadershipattitudes which the program is trying to promote.

It could also be argued that it would be in the national interest to divorce the United States Government entirely from the emigration and its activities. In this event the efforts of Soviet conservatives to justify repression of dissent on the basis of American "subversion" would lose some of their credibility. This argument, however, is negated by the fact that suspicions of U.S. intentions are so deeply ingrained that any change in U.S. policy toward the emigration would have minimal impact on the conservatives. Moreover, a source of support for those in the Soviet Union who are sustained by a sense of contact with the emigration would be removed and the Soviet authorities would be able more easily to foist their own version of events on the people and be under less pressure to make reforms.

== Soviet Union 1974 ==
=== Project Azorian (previously believed to be code named Jennifer (clandestine intelligence collection)) ===
Project Azorian was a clandestine technical collection operation to salvage the sunken Russian sub K-129. The purpose-built ship, the Glomar Explorer, employed a custom designed "capture vehicle" to grasp the submarine. During the subsequent lift to the surface, the submarine broke apart due to a failure in the capture vehicle arms. The hoped-for complete recovery did not happen, but a 38-foot forward section was brought into the Glomar Explorer moon pool. The fact that the US was able to show the Russians the at-sea burial of K-129 sailors clearly indicated the US recovered, at least, bodies in this forward section. Given the bodies were recovered, it is a reasonable assumption that other objects were recovered as well from the forward section. A follow-up mission (Project Matador) was aborted due to disclosure of the mission by US news sources.

== Soviet Union 1975 ==
=== Review of Soviet space systems (intelligence analysis) ===
Certain Soviet space programs are important to the overall Soviet system. The systems fall into three classes:

1. Scientific and national prestige
2. Economic benefit
3. Military and intelligence. 75% of Soviet satellites have been dedicated to missions including intelligence collection, geodesy, communications relay, weather and radar calibration. They have also developed an anti-satellite weapon

Soviet dependence on system has to be evaluated in terms of:

1. Dependence: systems for which there is no substantial alternative that is not space-based, and also perform critical functions
2. Degradation: space systems that have no terrestrial alternative, but whose functions are important, but not critical to the overall Soviet Union

Current development priorities include ocean surveillance and missile launch detection. Communications satellites are expected to become critical after 1985. The Soviets depend on these.

Space systems that can degrade include photographic imaging and satellite interception. These will become increasingly critical. Radar calibration satellites are essential if the Soviets deploy and need to test an anti-ballistic missile defense system.

It was estimated that even though they have a satellite interceptor, they will generally practice a non-interference policy toward other nations' satellites

== Soviet Union 1981 ==
=== Intelligence analysis ===
It was the judgment of CIA and the IC that the Soviets were deeply committed to "revolutionary violence worldwide". They see this as a basic part of destabilizing their adversaries.

The USSR has different policies toward different groups, depending on the goals of the groups, their methods, and presumably their security. Terrorist tactics, per se, do not offend Soviet scruples. The Soviets simply determine if those tactics are helpful or harmful to Soviet objectives. Not all groups accept Soviet control, and the Soviets deal with this on a case-by-case basis.

There is compelling evidence that the Soviets have sponsored a number of revolutionary and separatist-irredentist groups, especially in El Salvador, where they directly delivered arms.

Soviet operations in this area are under the direction of the International Department organization of the Central Committee of the Soviet Communist Party, not the security organs (i.e., KGB) or military. The International Department, however, tasks the KGB, GRU, and 10th Department of the General Staff to provide training and other support. They also use proxies, in the form of allies such as Libya, South Yemen, and Cuba, which directly support revolutionary groups.

The policy of the Soviet Union toward nihilistic terrorist groups remains unclear. There is some evidence of Soviet support, but not coordination of activities. At times, they have labeled certain of these groups "criminal", and counseled other groups to shun them.

There is no possibility the Soviet Union could be persuaded to join with the West in a comprehensive antiterrorist program.

It was emphasized that revolutionary violence, in the Third World, is not synonymous with terrorism, and that violent revolution would be an issue with which the United States will have to deal for the indefinite future.

=== Counterintelligence (offensive) ===
The Farewell Dossier in 1981 revealed massive Soviet espionage on Western technology. A successful counter-espionage program was created which involved giving defective technologies to Soviet agents.

== Soviet Union 1984 ==
The Cooperative Research Project website gives a photo of Casey touring Afghanistan and cites Steve Coll's 7/19/1992 Washington Post article asserting that "Casey wanted to ship subversive propaganda through Afghanistan to the Soviet Union's predominantly Muslim southern republics."

In the case of Uzbekistan, one example of this propaganda was to have the Qu'ran translated into Uzbek. This was the idea of then CIA director William Casey, who believed that spreading Islam in Uzbekistan would become a problem for the USSR. Pakistani General Mohammad Yousaf quoted him as saying "We should take the books and try to raise the local population against them, and you can also think of sending arms and ammunition if possible." Although no other sources exist for this quote, Steve Coll points not only to Qur'an translation and anti-Russian propaganda, but also Casey's work to establish cooperation between Uzbekistan and Afghanistan.

== Soviet Union 1985 ==
=== Covert action (paramilitary) ===
While the actual document has not been declassified, National Security Decision Directive 166 of 27 March 1985, "US Policy, Programs and Strategy in Afghanistan" defined a US policy of using established the US goal of driving Soviet forces from Afghanistan "by all means available". Initially, this involved close cooperation with Pakistan's Inter-Services Intelligence to assist mujahideen groups and in planning operations inside Afghanistan. Indeed, it was evident to residents in Islamabad and Peshawar in the 1980s that large numbers of Americans were present and involved in mysterious activities. This created linkages among hardened Muslim fighters worldwide. At first, the US supported the effort cautiously, concerned that the Soviet Union would act against Pakistan. "Some time into the war, however, the US began to take a much more overt position and US supplied technology played a key role in defeating the Soviet war machine in Afghanistan.
