= Ruth Finney =

American journalist (1898–1979)

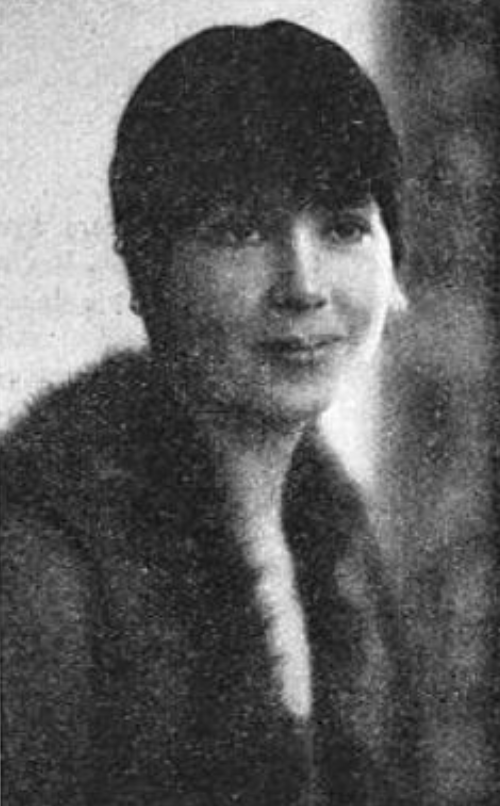
- Finney, from a 1929 publication
- Born: March 6, 1898; Chicago, Illinois, U.S.
- Died: March 20, 1979 (aged 81); Georgetown, District of Columbia, U.S.
- Other name: Ruth Finney Allen
- Occupation: Journalist
- Spouse: Robert S. Allen

Ruth Finney Allen (March 6, 1898 – March 20, 1979) was an American journalist. She worked as a reporter for The Sacramento Star and became nationally known for her coverage of the death of President Warren G. Harding. She became the Washington, D.C. correspondent for four Scripps-Howard newspapers.

== Early life ==
Finney was born on March 6, 1898, in Chicago, Illinois. Her parents were John W. and Mary Morrison Finney. After growing up in Downieville and Sacramento, California, Finney graduated from the San Jose Normal School with a teaching certificate in 1918 and worked for three months as a substitute teacher.

== Career ==
Finney became a reporter for The Sacramento Star in 1918. She became well known in the state for her report on the 1922 Argonaut Mine disaster in Jackson, California. After joining the San Francisco Daily News, she received national attention for reporting on the death of President Warren G. Harding in San Francisco. She was appointed by four California Scripps-Howard newspapers to be their Washington, D.C. correspondent in 1923. In this role, she covered the Teapot Dome Oil scandal, the execution of Sacco and Vanzetti, and the authorization of the construction of Hoover Dam. Finney was nominated for the Pulitzer Prize in 1931 for her investigation of the electric and gas utilities industry.

In 1941, Finney began writing a weekly column on news, politics and economics for the Scripps-Howard newspapers, titled "Washington Calling". She was an active member of the Washington Press Club. She worked as a correspondent for The Albuquerque Tribune until her retirement in 1968.

== Personal life ==
Finney married fellow journalist Robert S. Allen, the co-author for Washington Merry-Go-Round, in 1929. She died on March 20, 1979, in Georgetown at the age of 81.
