= Hanson W. Baldwin =

American journalist (1903–1991)

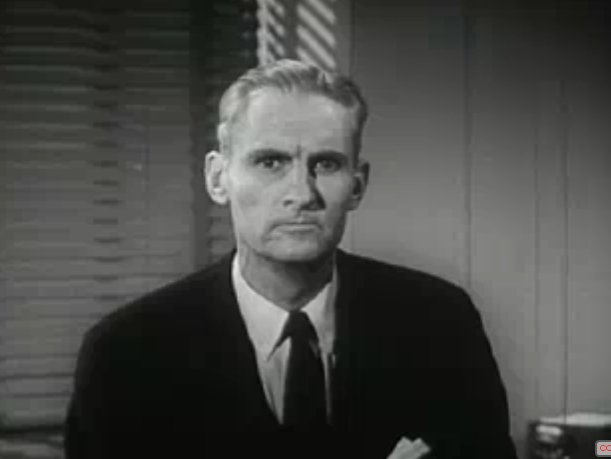
- Born: Hanson Weightman Baldwin; March 22, 1903; Baltimore, Maryland
- Died: November 13, 1991 (aged 88); Roxbury, Connecticut
- Education: United States Naval Academy
- Occupation: Journalist
- Spouse: Helen Baldwin (m. 1931)
- Children: 2

Hanson Weightman Baldwin (March 22, 1903 – November 13, 1991) was an American journalist and military historian who was the long-time military editor of The New York Times. He won a Pulitzer Prize "for his coverage of the early days of World War II". He wrote or edited numerous books on military topics.

== Early life ==
Hanson Baldwin was the son of Oliver Perry and Caroline (Sutton) Baldwin. He was born in Baltimore, Maryland on March 22, 1903. His father was an editor at The Baltimore Sun.

He attended the Boys' Latin School of Maryland in Baltimore and graduated from the United States Naval Academy in 1924. After three years of naval service he began his newspaper career in 1927 as a reporter for The Baltimore Sun. He joined The New York Times in 1929 and wrote for them for the next forty years. In 1937 he became the paper's military analyst. That year, he spent four months in Europe reporting on the military preparedness for what was viewed as the coming war. One of his first major stories in 1938 was of the interception of the ocean liner Rex by U.S. B-17 Flying Fortresses, in which he personally participated.

== Career ==
During World War II Baldwin wrote dispatches from the South Pacific, North Africa and Europe. His dispatches from Guadalcanal and the Western Pacific won him the Pulitzer Prize in 1943. His coverage of the Korean War for The New York Times has been criticized for its inaccuracy and its racism. In 1959 he broke the news of the high-altitude atomic bomb tests conducted by the United States, known as Operation Argus. Besides working for The Times, he lectured and wrote regularly for magazines, scholarly quarterlies and for professional military publications. His papers were given as "The Hanson W. Baldwin Collection" to the George C. Marshall Foundation. After his retirement he continued to write articles on military affairs for the news columns and op-ed page of The New York Times.

He authored scores of books on military and defense topics. His books published are: Men and Ships of Steel (1935), We Saw It Happen (1938), The Caissons Roll (1938), Admiral Dealth (1939), What the Citizen Should Know About the Navy (1941), United We Stand (1941), Strategy for Victory (1942), The Navy at War (1943), The Price of Power (1947), Great Mistakes of the War (1949), Sea fights and Shipwrecks (1955), The Great Arms Race (1958), World War I: An Outline History (1962), The New Navy (1964), Battles Lost and Won: Great Campaigns of World War II (1966), Strategy for Tomorrow (1970), The Crucial Years, 1939-1941 (1976), and Tiger Jack (1979).

Secretary of War Robert P. Patterson honored war correspondents, including Baldwin, at an event in Washington, on November 23, 1946.

In 1962, Baldwin was secretly wiretapped in a precursor to Project Mockingbird. President Kennedy was mystified by how Baldwin was able to obtain his information on the Cuba missile crises and he would not reveal his sources.

Besides the Pulitzer Prize, he received many awards and prizes, including the Distinguished Service Medal from Syracuse University in 1944 and the Golden Plate Award of the American Academy of Achievement in 1969. He also received honorary degrees from Drake University and the Clarkson Institute of Technology.

== Personal life ==
In 1931 he married Helen Bruce Baldwin (1907–1994) of Urbana, Ohio. Helen wrote poetry and articles on culinary subjects for various magazines. They had two daughters; Barbara Potter and Elizabeth Crabtree. The Baldwins lived in Chappaqua, New York.

Baldwin died in Roxbury, Connecticut on November 13, 1991.
