= Robert S. Allen =

American journalist (1900–1981)

- Robert S. Allen as a colonel, 1946
- Born: Herman Greenberg; July 14, 1900; Latonia, Kentucky, U.S.
- Died: February 23, 1981 (aged 80); Washington, D.C., U.S
- Resting place: Arlington National Cemetery
- Education: University of Wisconsin–Madison
- Occupations: Journalist; author; columnist
- Spouses: Ruth Finney (m. 1929; died 1979) Adeline Sunday (m. 1980)
- Military career
- Allegiance: United States of America
- Branch: United States Army; Wisconsin Army National Guard
- Service years: 1916–1929; 1943–1946
- Rank: Colonel
- Nickname: Bob
- Units: Third United States Army; 6th Cavalry Regiment
- Conflicts: Mexican Punitive Expedition; World War I World War II
- Awards: Silver Star; Legion of Merit; Bronze Star; Purple Heart; Croix de guerre

Robert Sharon Allen (July 14, 1900 — February 23, 1981) was an American journalist, Washington bureau chief for The Christian Science Monitor, and military officer.

== Background ==
Robert Sharon Allen was born on July 14, 1900, in Latonia, Kentucky, to Harry and Lizzie (Elizabeth) Greenberg. Allen's given name was Herman Greenberg. He changed his name and lied about his age in order to join the military on September 6, 1916. His father officially changed his name to match his son's in 1918, saying that there was a German "taint" to the last part of his name and he desired a real American name. After that time all the family except his brother Isador used the name.

Allen married fellow journalist Ruth Finney in 1929, and they remained married until her death in 1979. He later married Adeline Sunday (1921–2017), his former secretary.

== Career ==
Allen joined the army, lying about his age in order to do so, and served in the cavalry during the Pancho Villa Expedition of 1916–17 and in France during World War I.

After the war, he graduated from the University of Wisconsin and took up reporting. He joined the Ku Klux Klan in order to write an exposé about them, and was studying in Munich at the time of Hitler's Beer Hall Putsch (1923). It was at this time he became a foreign correspondent for the Christian Science Monitor.

In 1931, Allen was the Washington bureau chief for the Christian Science Monitor. Because the magazine would not publish content critical of Herbert Hoover, Allen and Drew Pearson anonymously co-wrote the book Washington Merry-Go-Round, an exposé of the Hoover administration. After Hoover tracked down their identities, both authors were fired. In 1932 the two journalists published a sequel, More Merry-Go-Round, and wrote a nationally syndicated column titled "Merry-Go-Round".

In 1933, Allen worked as a Soviet agent (Sh/147) for $100 a month. According to John Earl Haynes, Harvey Klehr and Alexander Vassiliev in their 2009 book Spies: The Rise and Fall of the KGB in America, this was legal for Allen to do, being prior to the passage of the 1938 Foreign Agents Registration Act, and his motivation is unknown.

In 1933, Allen was a fully recruited and undoubtedly witting Soviet agent. Under the assigned cover name of "George Parker," he covertly exchanged privileged information for money. He provided the Soviets with intelligence about Japanese military fortifications; news about potential appointments in the incoming Roosevelt administration; and information about the US government's plans for diplomatic recognition of the Soviet Union.

In 1937, during the court-packing controversy, Allen and Pearson co-authored the book The Nine Old Men, about the U.S. Supreme Court. During the early forties he co-wrote the newspaper strip Hap Hopper with Drew Pearson. The strip was drawn by Jack Sparling.

He served on General Patton's staff in World War II, reaching the rank of colonel. During a reconnaissance mission on April 7, 1945, near Apfelstädt, close to Erfurt, he got caught up in a firefight with a German unit and was seriously wounded. He was then taken prisoner and brought to a German military hospital in Erfurt. There, his arm was amputated. On April 11, 1945, he was liberated by soldiers of the 80th Infantry Division. His wartime diary was published after his death.

He edited the book Our Fair City. He also wrote Lucky Forward: The History of Patton's Third Army.

According to documents released by the CIA in 2007, Allen was the subject of a wiretap operation, Project Mockingbird. Associated Press reported:

"Under pressure from Attorney General Robert F. Kennedy" in 1962, CIA director John McCone "agreed to tap the telephones of columnists Robert S. Allen and Paul Scott in an effort to identify their sources for classified information which was appearing in their columns," says a memo a decade later to the agency's director."

== Death ==
Allen died from a self-inflicted gunshot wound at his home in Georgetown on February 23, 1981, at age 80. He also had cancer at the time of his death, and the effects of the disease had forced him to retire the year prior.
