= Project Mockingbird =

American wiretapping operation

Project Mockingbird was a wiretapping operation initiated by United States President John F. Kennedy to identify the sources of government leaks by eavesdropping on the communications of journalists.

== History ==
In October 2001, the Miller Center of Public Affairs published transcripts of secretly recorded conversations in the Oval Office during the summer of 1962 in which Kennedy took steps, using the CIA, to spy on Hanson Baldwin, the national security reporter for The New York Times. Baldwin had angered the president with an article in the July 26, 1962, issue of The New York Times that divulged classified information from a recent National Intelligence Estimate, including a comparison of the United States and Soviet Union's nuclear arsenals and the Soviets' efforts to protect their intercontinental ballistic missile sites.

Knowledge of Project Mockingbird was made public in June 2007 when the CIA declassified a 702-page document widely referred to as the Family Jewels. The document was compiled in response to a May 1973 directive from Director of Central Intelligence James Schlesinger asking CIA employees to report any past or present activities they thought might be inconsistent with the agency's charter. According to a memo from director of security Howard J. Osborn to the executive secretary of the CIA Management Committee (i.e. future DCI William Colby (Note: William Colby was Executive Secretary of the CIA Management Committee at the time of the memo.)) that summarized the Family Jewels:

Project Mockingbird, a telephone intercept activity, was conducted between 12 March 1963 and 15 June 1963, and targeted two Washington based newsmen who, at the time, had been publishing news articles based on, and frequently quoting, classified materials of this Agency and others, including Top Secret and Special Intelligence.

According to the declassified documents, the order for warrantless wiretaps came from Director of Central Intelligence John McCone who coordinated with United States Attorney General Robert F. Kennedy, United States Secretary of Defense Robert McNamara, and Director of the Defense Intelligence Agency Joseph Carroll. The program was run by the Office of Security, headed by Sheffield Edwards, who received their orders from McCone. Other Agency personnel included Deputy Director of Central Intelligence Marshall Carter, executive director-comptroller Lyman Kirkpatrick, general counsel Lawrence Houston, and McCone's executive assistant Walter Elder. An internal CIA biography of McCone by CIA chief historian David Robarge, made public under a FOIA request, identified the two reporters as Robert S. Allen and Paul Scott. Their syndicated column, "The Allen-Scott Report," appeared in as many as three hundred papers at the height of its popularity.

In 1975, the Rockefeller Commission's inquiry examined investigations by the CIA's Office of Security that included electronic surveillance and found two cases in which the telephones of three newsman were tapped in order to determine their sources of leaked classified information. The Commission wrote: "The CIA's investigations of newsmen to determine their sources of classified information stemmed from pressures from the White House and were partly a result of the FBI's unwillingness to undertake such investigations. The FBI refused to proceed without an advance opinion that the Justice Department would prosecute if a case were developed." They concluded: "The CIA has no authority to investigate newsmen simply because they have published leaked classified information." (Note: The Commission on CIA Activities within the United States (Rockefeller Commission) received material regarding Project Mockingbird (see memo from E. Henry Knoche to David W. Belin), but did not mention it by name in their report.)

In 2009, Daniel L. Pines, the assistant general counsel of the Office of General Counsel within the CIA, wrote a law review published in the Indiana Law Journal challenging the assertion that most of the activities described within the Family Jewels were illegal. Pines wrote that the CIA was permitted to engage in warrantless electronic surveillance within the United States with the attorney general's approval if the purpose was to collect foreign intelligence, but concluded that Project Mockingbird was likely not legal because the apparent purpose of the surveillance was to determine the source of leaks rather than to obtain foreign intelligence. Pines noted that the Rockefeller Commission agreed with this conclusion.

== See also ==
- Operation Mockingbird
