= Project MERRIMAC =

Project MERRIMACK was a domestic espionage operation coordinated under the Office of Security of the CIA. It involved information gathering procedures via infiltration and surveillance on Washington-based anti-war groups that might pose potential threats to the CIA. However, the type of data gathered also included general information on the infrastructure of targeted communities. Project MERRIMACK and its twin program, Project RESISTANCE were both coordinated by the CIA Office of Security. In addition, the twin projects were branch operations that relayed civilian information to their parent program, Operation CHAOS. The Assassination Archives and Research Center believes that Project MERRIMACK began in February 1967.

== See also ==
- Operation CHAOS
- Project RESISTANCE
- COINTELPRO
