= Project RESISTANCE =

Project RESISTANCE was a domestic espionage operation coordinated under the Domestic Operations Division of the CIA. Its purpose was to collect background information on groups around the U.S. that the CIA thought posed threats to their facilities and personnel.

From 1967 to 1973, many local police departments, college campus staff members, and other independent informants collaborated with the CIA to keep track of student radical groups that opposed the U.S. government's foreign policies on Vietnam.

Project RESISTANCE and its twin program, Project MERRIMAC were both coordinated by the CIA Office of Security. In addition, the twin projects were branch operations that relayed civilian information to their parent program, Operation CHAOS.

== See also ==
- COINTELPRO
