= HTLINGUAL =

CIA project to intercept mail to Soviet Union/China

HTLINGUAL (also HGLINGUAL) was an illegal secret project of the United States of America's Central Intelligence Agency (CIA) to intercept mail destined for the Soviet Union and China. It operated from 1952 until 1973. Originally known under the codename SRPOINTER (also SGPOINTER), the project authority was changed in 1955 and renamed. Early on, the CIA collected only the names and addresses appearing on the exterior of mailed items, but they were later opened at CIA facilities in Los Angeles and in New York.

The program had the stated purpose of obtaining foreign intelligence, but it targeted domestic peace and civil-rights activists as well. Mail to and from prominent individuals such as Bella Abzug, Bobby Fischer, Linus Pauling, John Steinbeck, Martin Luther King Jr., Edward Albee, and Hubert Humphrey was opened during the course of the operation. A total of 28 million letters were examined, and 215,000 were opened.

== See also ==
- Cabinet noir
- Project Mockingbird
