= Pongpat Chayaphan =

Thai police officer (born 1956)

Pongpat Chayaphan (born April 22, 1956, in Mueang Samut Sakhon District, Samut Sakhon Province) is a former Royal Thai Police officer. He was the Commissioner of the Central Investigation Bureau, until he was dismissed and ultimately arrested. He is also the uncle of the crown prince's former consort, Srirasmi Suwadee.

Pongpat graduated from Samut Sakhon Wittayalai School, Royal Thai Police Cadet Academy, Chulalongkorn University, and took an additional intelligence investigation course at the CIA University in Virginia, United States.

Pongpat had been involved in the several high-profile cases, and was ascending in the line of his bureau, becoming the Crime Suppression Division Commander, before ultimately becoming the Central Investigation Police Commissioner. He also had academic abilities, authoring several books on policing and a lecturer in many related courses, and is also claimed to have introduced Community Policing and Behavioral Analysis, both of which were new concepts to the Police Department at the time.

When he became the Commissioner of the Central Investigation Bureau, he protested the Police Commissioner-General Somyot Poompanmuong for the latter's failure in police welfare accommodation, while claiming that he had intended the protest since he was the Deputy Commissioner.

In 2015, while in the Central Commissioner's office, Pongpat was dismissed from Police Service by the then-Police Commissioner-General Somyot Poompanmuong, along with those claimed to be his crime syndicate. He was later convicted of benefiting from a gambling den, violating a forestry-related law, money laundering and lese majeste. When combined with the original jail sentence, according to the judgment, he must be sentenced to prison for 36 years and 4 months.

Currently, Pongpat is serving his sentence, with his rank of Police Lieutenant General and any honor revoked.
