= Executive Order 13355 =

Order strengthening American intelligence agencies

Executive Order 13355 is a United States Presidential executive order signed on August 27, 2004, by President George W. Bush. Its goal was "Strengthened Management of the Intelligence Community". It supplemented and partially superseded Executive Order 12333, signed in 1981 by President Ronald Reagan, and was in turn partially supplemented and superseded by Executive Order 13470 in 2008.

Many of the clauses of the new executive order changed how US intelligence agencies were governed and how they ultimately reported to the President, to reflect that when Executive Order 12333 was signed, the DCI Director of Central Intelligence was also the nominal chief of all US intelligence agencies. President Bush had created a new position, the Director of National Intelligence (DNI), and the changes reflected that the US intelligence agencies were to report to the President through the DNI.
