= Executive Order 12333 =

Order officially creating the U.S. Intelligence Community

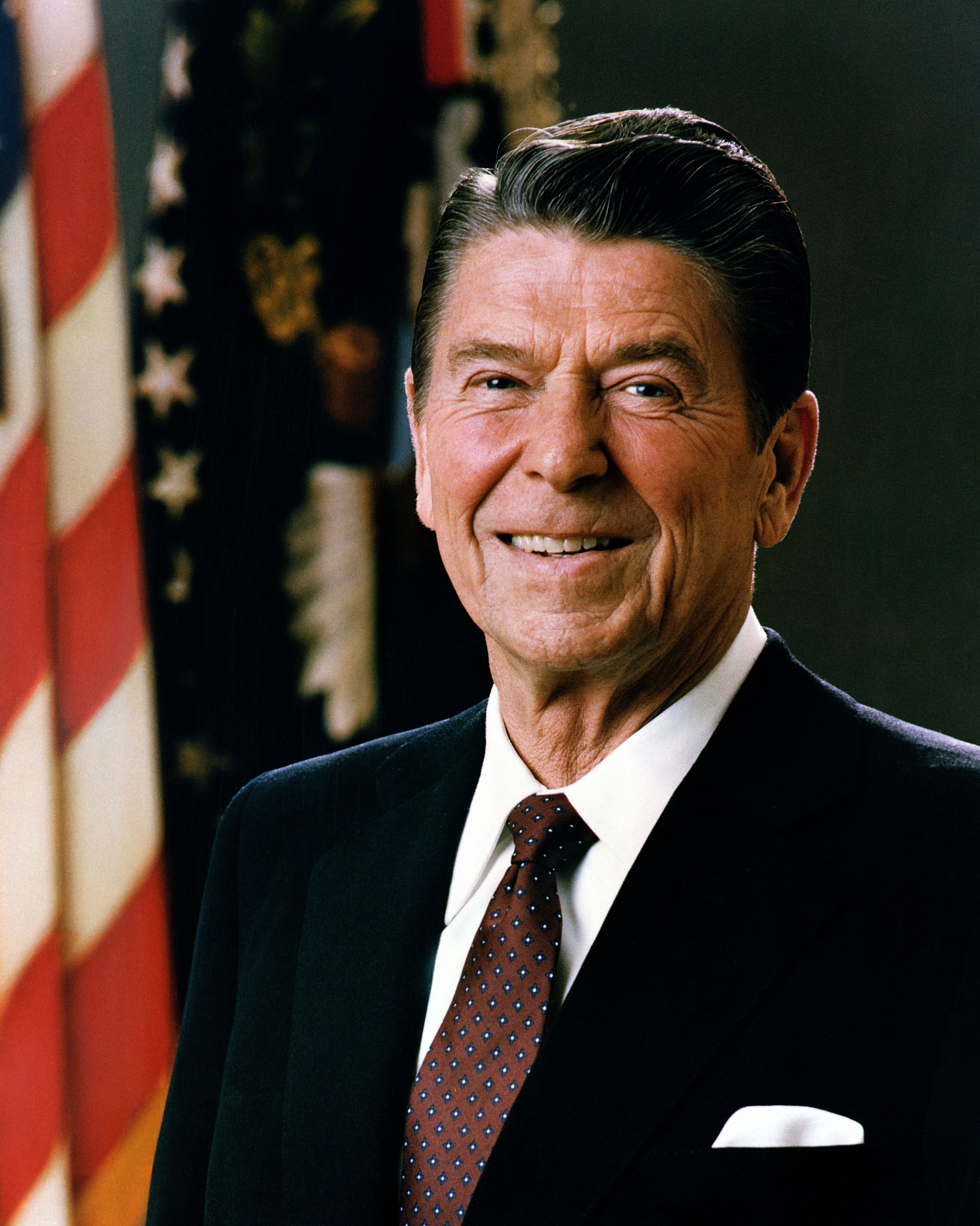
Executive Order 12333 was signed by President Ronald Reagan on December 4, 1981.

Executive Order 12333, signed on December 4, 1981 by U.S. president Ronald Reagan, was an executive order intended to extend powers and responsibilities of U.S. intelligence agencies and direct the leaders of U.S. federal agencies to co-operate fully with CIA requests for information. This executive order was titled United States Intelligence Activities.

It was amended by Executive Order 13355: Strengthened Management of the Intelligence Community, on August 27, 2004. On July 30, 2008, President George W. Bush issued Executive Order 13470 amending Executive Order 12333 to strengthen the role of the director of national intelligence (DNI).

== Part 1 ==
"Goals, Direction, Duties and Responsibilities with Respect to the National Intelligence Effort" lays out roles for various intelligence agencies, including the Departments of Defense, Energy, State, and Treasury.

=== The Intelligence Community ===
Part 1.4 details situations in which intelligence activities are allowed to be carried out by the United States Intelligence Community for reasons such as foreign relations and national security.

== Part 2 ==
"Conduct of Intelligence Activities" provides guidelines for actions of intelligence agencies.

=== Collection of Information ===
Part 2.3 permits collection, retention and dissemination of the following types of information along with several others.

(c) Information obtained in the course of lawful foreign intelligence, counterintelligence, international narcotics or international terrorism investigation

...

(i) Incidentally obtained information that may indicate involvement in activities that may violate federal, state, local or foreign laws

=== Prohibition on Assassination ===
Part 2.11 of this executive order reiterates a prohibition of U.S. intelligence agencies sponsoring or carrying out assassinations. It reads:

No person employed by or acting on behalf of the United States Government shall engage in, or conspire to engage in, assassination.

Previously, EO 11905 (Gerald Ford) had banned political assassinations and EO 12036 (Jimmy Carter) had further banned indirect U.S. involvement in assassinations. The ban arose in the context of the Church Committee investigation of intelligence activities, which identified U.S. assassination plots against government figures in Cuba, South Vietnam, the Dominican Republic and the Democratic Republic of the Congo merely to have people more favorable to U.S. interests replace them.

A 1989 memorandum interprets the ban as an assertion of those bans already existing in international law, namely the United Nations Charter's principles of state territorial integrity and political independence and the 1907 Hague Convention on laws of war. The Convention prohibits poisoning, "treacherous" killing, no quarter, and killing surrendered or disabled combatants in wartime. The memorandum determined that the order does not preclude the president from ordering military force against combatant forces that pose a direct threat to the security of the United States or its citizens.

== Impact ==
Executive Order 12333 has been regarded by the American intelligence community as a fundamental document authorizing the expansion of data collection activities. The document has been employed by the National Security Agency as legal authorization for its collection of unencrypted information flowing through the data centers of internet communications giants Google and Yahoo!.

In July 2014 chairman David Medine and two other members of the Privacy and Civil Liberties Oversight Board, a government oversight agency, indicated a desire to review Executive Order 12333 in the near future, according to a report by journalist Spencer Ackerman of The Guardian.

In July 2014, former State Department official John Tye published an editorial in The Washington Post, citing his prior access to classified material on intelligence-gathering activities under Executive Order 12333, and arguing that the order represented a significant threat to Americans' privacy and civil liberties. Specifically, Tye alleged:

Hypothetically, under 12333 the NSA could target a single foreigner abroad. And hypothetically if, while targeting that single person, they happened to collect every single Gmail and every single Facebook message on the company servers not just from the one person who is the target, but from everyone—then the NSA could keep and use the data from those three billion other people. That’s called 'incidental collection.' I will not confirm or deny that that is happening, but there is nothing in 12333 to prevent that from happening.

== See also ==
- United States Intelligence Community
- Church Committee
- COINTELPRO
- List of United States federal executive orders
- Targeted killing
