= Sherman Kent School for Intelligence Analysis =

CIA training school

The Sherman Kent School logo

The Sherman Kent School for Intelligence Analysis is a training school for Central Intelligence Agency (CIA) intelligence analysts located in Reston, Virginia. Opened in May 2000, the school is housed on the second floor of a five-story structure of polished brick and smoked glass that is sheathed with special materials and contains sensors designed to prevent eavesdropping from outside. The school's study area is nicknamed "The Vault" due to the presence of numerous locks, alarms and guards.

The school serves as the CIA Directorate of Intelligence's component of CIA University, a CIA-wide training program founded in 2002 in response to changing intelligence needs following the September 11 attacks. Courses include foreign languages, regional studies, satellite image analysis, wiretap transcript analysis, and media report analysis.

The school is named for Sherman Kent, a Yale University history professor and CIA officer who pioneered many methods of intelligence analysis.

== See also ==
- CIA University
- Camp Peary
- Harvey Point
- Sherman Kent
- Warrenton Training Center
