= CIA University =

Training facility of the U.S. Central Intelligence Agency

Coordinates: 38.9178°N 77.4272°W

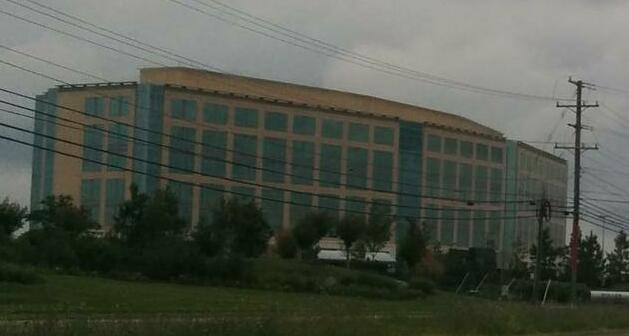
Dulles Discovery Building 3 on the CIA University campus in Chantilly, Virginia, in 2015

CIA University (CIAU) is the primary education facility of the U.S. Central Intelligence Agency (CIA). Founded in 2002 and located in Chantilly, Virginia, the school holds courses on various intelligence-related subjects, ranging from chemical weapons manufacturing to foreign languages. Students include CIA new hires, experienced officers, support staff, and individuals from other U.S. intelligence agencies. CIAU does not issue degrees.

== History ==
The CIA was founded in 1947 and in 1950 created its first training establishment, the Office of Training and Education. In the 1990s, following the end of the Cold War, budget cuts forced the CIA to drastically reduce the size and scope of its education programs. During his tenure as Director of Central Intelligence, George Tenet decided the agency needed an expanded training program in order to help retain talented staff.

Tenet authorized the creation of a new training school soon after the September 11, 2001 terrorist attacks, and thus CIAU was established in 2002.

The CIAU campus is located within the Dulles Discovery office buildings in Chantilly, Virginia, which were constructed in 2007 and 2010.

== Courses ==
CIAU is the primary education facility of the CIA, working in partnership with the National Intelligence University, and serving as a hub that links other CIA education programs, such as the Sherman Kent School for Intelligence Analysis. It does not issue degrees.

The school holds between 200 and 300 courses each year. Each course typically runs for two weeks or less, except for the basic training of new hires (designated "CIA 101"), which lasts several weeks, and language courses, which run between 21 and 44 weeks. CIA officers receive training throughout their agency careers, and course offerings are continuously updated to keep pace with current events. Courses are held in a traditional classroom setting or may be conducted either online, via videoconference, or through podcasts. Subjects taught at the school have included chemical weapons manufacturing, communication skills, defensive driving, dirty bombs, geography of critical regions, information technology, intelligence community, money laundering, project management, terrorism, weapons of mass destruction, weapons proliferation, and weapons training. Additionally, 16 language courses are taught at the school. At one time, students were taught how to draft the President's Daily Brief (PDB); however, responsibility for producing the PDB was transferred from the CIA to the Director of National Intelligence in 2005.

== Students and faculty ==
CIAU trains agency new hires as well as experienced intelligence operations officers, and intelligence scientists and engineers. The school also trains CIA support officers, such as those in finance, human resources, or logistics. Up to 15 percent of the school's enrollment consists of employees from other U.S. intelligence agencies such as the Defense Intelligence Agency and the Federal Bureau of Investigation. CIAU does not enroll spies, who are typically foreign individuals not considered intelligence officers.

The school's faculty consists of professional educators along with intelligence experts drawn from within the agency. Many of the school's case studies and exercises are drawn from the CIA's historical experience.

== See also ==
- National Intelligence University
- Sherman Kent School for Intelligence Analysis
- National Cryptologic School
- Camp Peary
- Harvey Point
- National Defense University
- Warrenton Training Center
