= Executive Order 13470 =

Order strengthening the Director of National Intelligence

Executive Order 13470 was issued by President Bush on July 30, 2008. It amended Executive Order 12333 to strengthen the role of the director of national intelligence.

== See also ==
- Executive order
- List of United States federal executive orders
