= USS Maine (1890) =

Battleship of the United States Navy

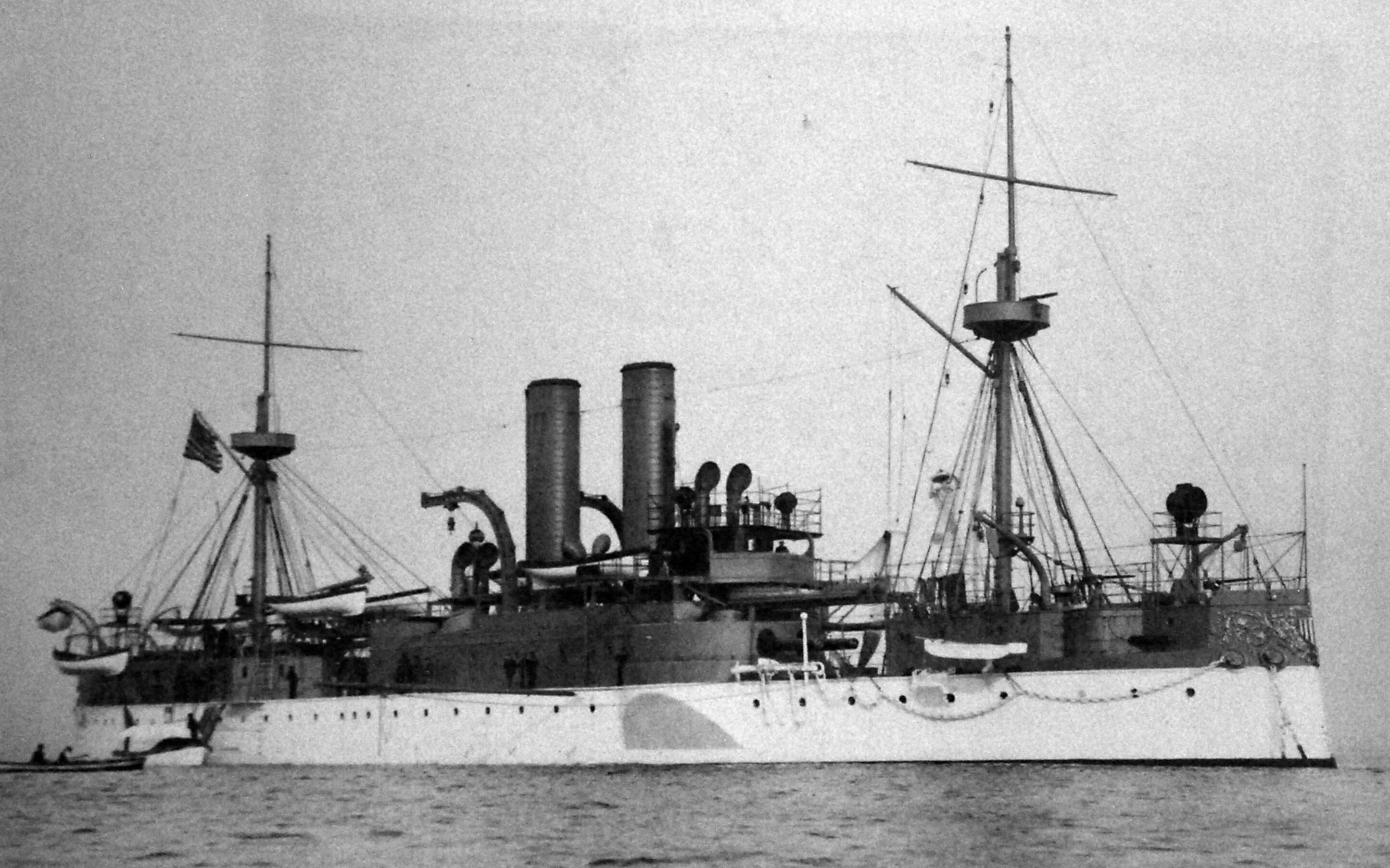
- Starboard bow view of USS Maine, 1898

Class overview
- Builders: New York Naval Shipyard, Brooklyn
- Operators: United States Navy
- Succeeded by: USS New York (ACR-2)
- Built: 1888–1895
- In commission: 1895–1898
- Completed: 1
- Lost: 1

History

United States
- Name: Maine
- Namesake: Maine
- Ordered: 3 August 1886
- Builder: New York Naval Shipyard
- Laid down: 17 October 1888
- Launched: 18 November 1890
- Sponsored by: Alice Tracy Wilmerding
- Christened: 18 November 1890
- Commissioned: 17 September 1895
- Fate: Sunk by explosion in Havana Harbor, Havana, Cuba, 15 February 1898; Remains scuttled in the Strait of Florida, 16 March 1912

General characteristics
- Type: Armored cruiser or second-class battleship
- Displacement: 6,682 long tons (6,789 t)
- Length: 324 ft 4 in (98.9 m) overall length
- Beam: 57 ft (17.4 m)
- Draft: 22 ft 6 in (6.9 m) (max)
- Installed power: 8 × boilers; 9,293 ihp (6,930 kW)
- Propulsion: 2 × triple-expansion steam engines; 2 × screws
- Speed: 16.5 knots (30.6 km/h; 19.0 mph)
- Range: 3,600 nmi (6,700 km; 4,100 mi) at 10 knots (19 km/h; 12 mph)
- Complement: 374 officers and men
- Armament: 2 × twin 10 in (254 mm) guns; 6 × single 6 in (152 mm) guns; 7 × single 6-pdr (57 mm [2.2 in]) guns; 4 × single 1-pdr (37 mm [1.5 in]) Hotchkiss guns; 4 × single Driggs-Schroeder 1-pdr guns; 4 × .45-70 Gatling guns; 4 × 18 in (460 mm) torpedo tubes
- Armor: Belt: 12 in (305 mm); Deck: 2–3 in (51–76 mm); Turrets: 8 in (203 mm); Conning tower: 10 in (254 mm); Bulkheads: 6 in (152 mm)

USS Maine was a United States Navy ship that sank in Havana Harbor on February 15, 1898, contributing to the outbreak of the Spanish–American War in April. U.S. newspapers claimed that the Spanish were responsible for the ship's destruction, while evidence points to an accident caused by an internal coal bunker fire. The phrase "Remember the Maine! To hell with Spain!" became a rallying cry for action. The Maine explosion served as a catalyst which accelerated the events leading up to the war.

Maine is described as an armored cruiser or second-class battleship, depending on the source, ordered in 1886. She was the first U.S. Navy ship to be named after the state of Maine. (Note: Texas was laid down after Maine, but commissioned first.) Maine and its contemporary the battleship Texas were both represented as an advance in American warship design, reflecting the latest European naval developments. Both ships had two-gun turrets staggered en échelon, and full sailing masts were omitted due to the increased reliability of steam engines. Maine and Texas were obsolete by the time of completion due to a protracted nine-year construction period. Far more advanced vessels were in service or nearing completion that year.

Maine was sent to Havana Harbor to protect U.S. interests during the Cuban War of Independence. She exploded and sank on the evening of February 15, 1898, killing 268 sailors, which was three-quarters of her crew. In 1898, a U.S. Navy board of inquiry ruled that the ship had been sunk by an external explosion from a mine. However, some U.S. Navy officers disagreed with the board, suggesting that the ship's magazines had been ignited by a spontaneous fire in a coal bunker. The coal used in Maine was bituminous, which is known for releasing firedamp, a mixture of gases composed primarily of flammable methane that is prone to spontaneous explosions. An investigation by Admiral Hyman Rickover in 1974 agreed with the coal fire hypothesis, presented in a 1976 monograph that argued for this conclusion. The cause of her sinking remains a subject of debate.

The ship lay at the bottom of the harbor until 1911, when it was patched and refloated within a cofferdam. The hull was then towed to sea and sunk. Maine now lies on the seabed 3,600 feet (1,100 m) below the surface. The ship's main mast is now a memorial in Arlington National Cemetery.

== Background ==
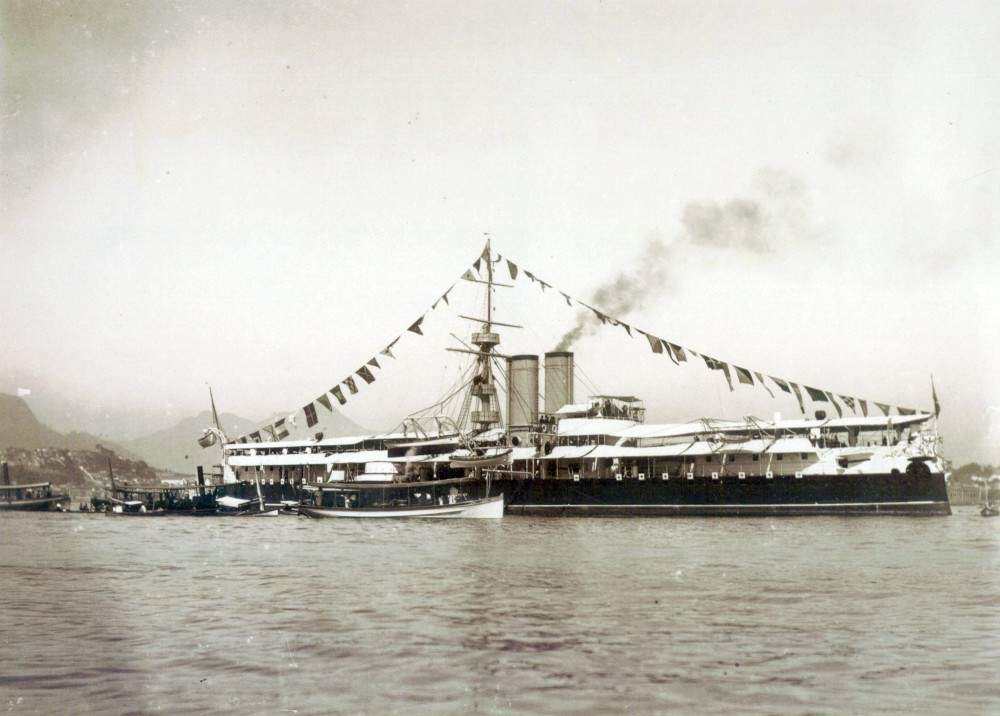
The Brazilian ironclad battleship Riachuelo, which prompted the building of Maine

In response to the delivery of the Brazilian battleship Riachuelo in 1883 and the acquisition of other modern armored warships from Europe by Brazil, Argentina and Chile, the head of the House Naval Affairs Committee, Hilary A. Herbert, stated to Congress: "if all this old navy of ours were drawn up in battle array in mid-ocean and confronted by Riachuelo it is doubtful whether a single vessel bearing the American flag would get into port." These developments helped bring to a head a series of discussions that had been taking place at the Naval Advisory Board since 1881. The board knew at that time that the U.S. Navy could not challenge any major European fleet; at best, it could wear down an opponent's merchant fleet and hope to make some progress through general attrition. Moreover, projecting naval force abroad through the use of battleships ran counter to the government policy of isolationism. While some on the board supported a strict policy of commerce raiding, others argued it would be ineffective against the potential threat of enemy battleships stationed near the American coast. The two sides remained essentially deadlocked until Riachuelo manifested.

The board, now confronted with the concrete possibility of hostile warships operating off the American coast, began planning for ships to protect it in 1884. The ships had to fit within existing docks and had to have a shallow draft to enable them to use all the major American ports and bases. The maximum beam was similarly fixed, and the board concluded that at a length of about 300 feet (91 m), the maximum displacement would be about 7,000 tons. A year later the Bureau of Construction and Repair (C & R) presented two designs to Secretary of the Navy William Collins Whitney, one for a 7,500-ton battleship and one for a 5,000-ton armored cruiser. Whitney decided instead to ask Congress for two 6,000-ton warships, and they were authorized in August 1886. A design contest was held, asking naval architects to submit designs for the two ships: armored cruiser Maine and battleship Texas. It was specified that Maine had to have a speed of 17 knots (31 km/h; 20 mph), a ram bow, and a double bottom, and be able to carry two torpedo boats. Her armament was specified as: four 10-inch (254 mm) guns, six 6-inch (152 mm) guns, various light weapons, and four torpedo tubes. It was specifically stated that the main guns "must afford heavy bow and stern fire." Armor thickness and many details were also defined. Specifications for Texas were similar but demanded a main battery of two 12-inch (305 mm) guns and slightly thicker armor.

The winning design for Maine was from Theodore D. Wilson, who served as chief constructor for C & R and was a member on the Naval Advisory Board in 1881. He had designed a number of other warships for the navy. The winning design for Texas was from a British designer, William John, who was working for the Barrow Shipbuilding Company at that time. Both designs resembled the Brazilian battleship Riachuelo, having the main gun turrets positioned out over the sides of the ship and echeloned. The winning design for Maine, though conservative and inferior to other contenders, may have received special consideration due to a requirement that one of the two new ships be American-designed.

Congress authorized construction of Maine on 3 August 1886, and her keel was laid down on 17 October 1888, at the Brooklyn Navy Yard. She was the largest vessel built in a U.S. Navy yard up to that time.

== Design ==
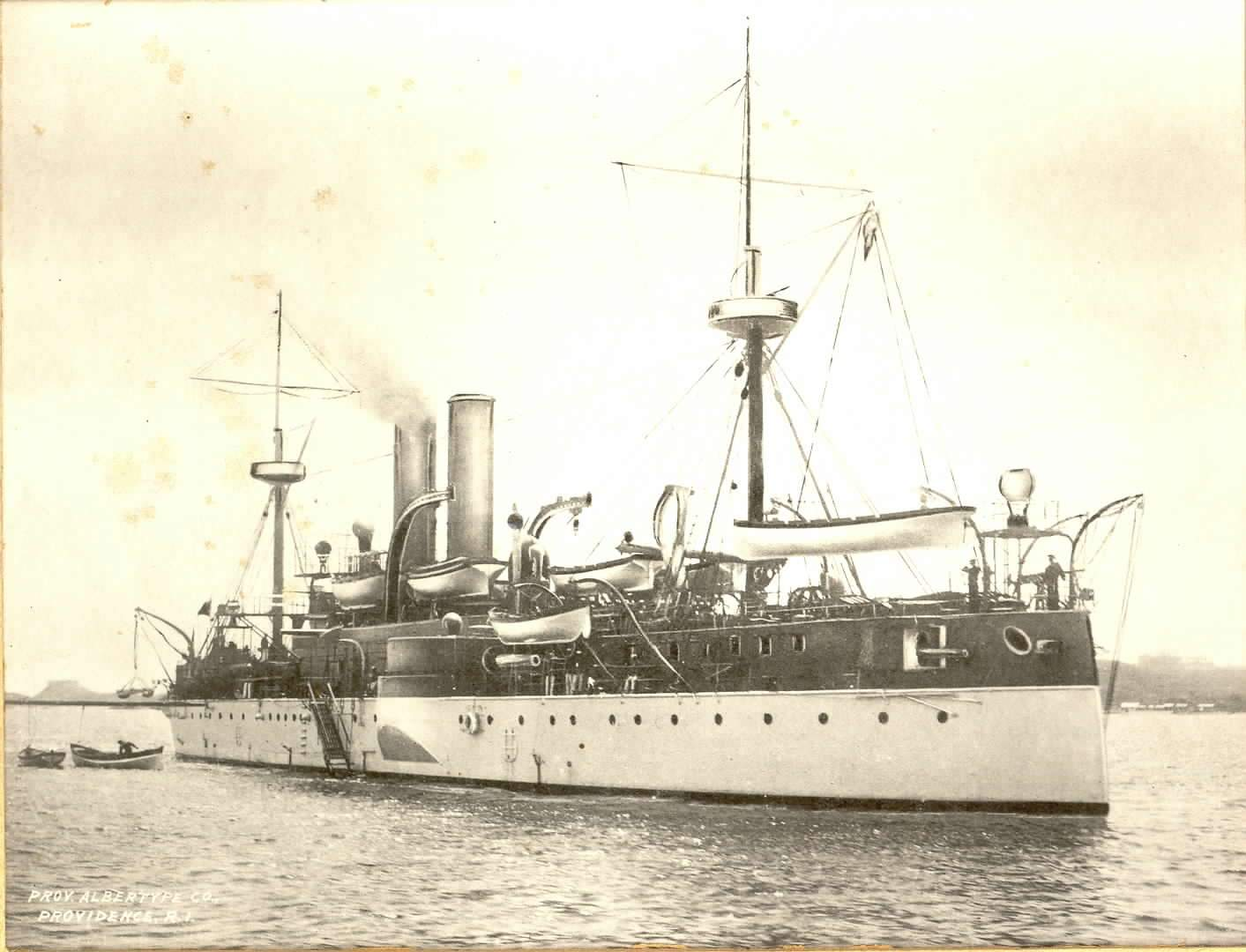
Stern view of Maine

Maine's building time of nine years was unusually protracted as a result of the limits of American industry at the time. (The delivery of her armored plating took three years, and a fire in the drafting room of the building yard, where Maine's working set of blueprints were stored, caused further delay.) During the nine-year construction span, naval tactics and technology changed radically and left Maine's role in the navy ill-defined. At the time when she was laid down, armored cruisers such as Maine were intended to serve as small battleships on overseas service and were built with heavy belt armor. Great Britain, France and Russia had constructed such ships to serve this purpose and sold others of this type, including Riachuelo, to second-rate navies. Within a decade, this role had changed to one of commerce raiding, for which fast, long-range vessels, with only limited armor protection, were needed. The advent of lightweight armor, such as Harvey steel, made this transformation possible.

As a result of these changing priorities, Maine was caught between two separate positions and could not perform either one adequately. She lacked both the armor and firepower to serve as a ship-of-the-line against enemy battleships and the speed to serve as a cruiser. Nevertheless, she was expected to fulfill more than one tactical function. In addition, because of the potential of a warship sustaining blast damage to herself from cross-deck and end-on fire, Maine's main-gun arrangement was obsolete by the time she entered service.

=== General characteristics ===
Maine was 324 feet 4 inches (98.9 m) long overall, with a beam of 57 feet (17.4 m), a maximum draft of 22 feet 6 inches (6.9 m) and a displacement of 6,682 long tons (6,789.2 t). She was divided into 214 watertight compartments. A centerline longitudinal watertight bulkhead separated the engines and a double bottom covered the hull only from the foremast to the aft end of the armored citadel, a distance of 196 feet (59.7 m). She had a metacentric height of 3.45 feet (1.1 m) as designed and was fitted with a ram bow.

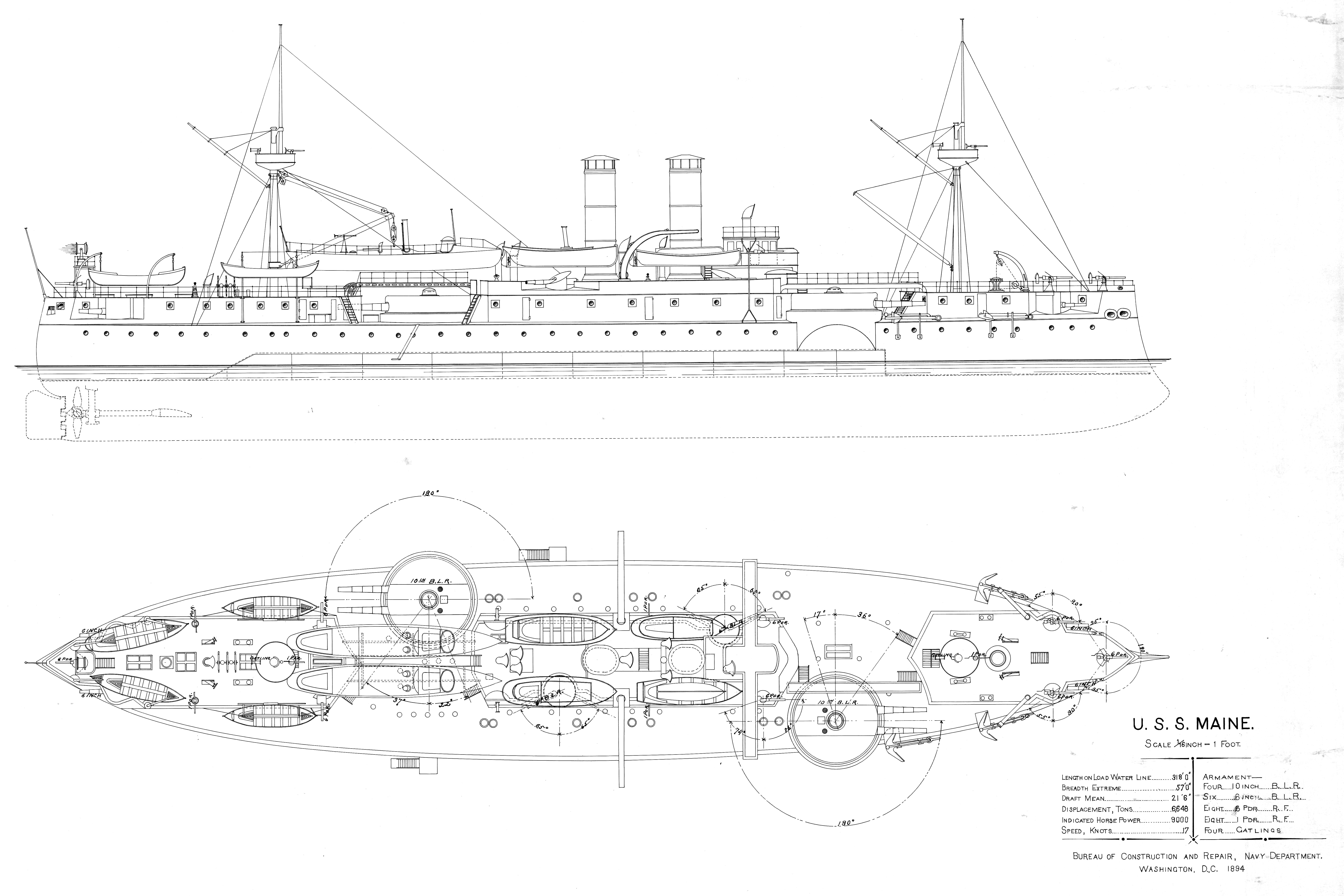
Profile and deck plan of Maine, showing its echeloned turret placement

Maine's hull was long and narrow, more like that of a cruiser than that of Texas, which was wide-beamed. Normally, this would have made Maine the faster ship of the two, but Maine's weight distribution was ill-balanced, which slowed her considerably. Her main turrets, awkwardly situated on a cutaway gundeck, were nearly awash in bad weather. Because they were mounted toward the ends of the ship, away from its center of gravity, Maine was also prone to greater motion in heavy seas. While she and Texas were both considered seaworthy, the latter's high hull and guns mounted on her main deck made her the drier ship.

The two main gun turrets were sponsoned over the sides of the ship and echeloned to allow both to fire fore and aft. The practice of en echelon mounting had begun with Italian battleships designed in the 1870s by Benedetto Brin and followed by the British Navy with HMS Inflexible, which was laid down in 1874 but not commissioned until October 1881. This gun arrangement met the design demand for heavy end-on fire in a ship-to-ship encounter, tactics that involved ramming the enemy vessel. The wisdom of this tactic was largely theoretical at the time when it was implemented. A drawback of an en echelon layout limited the ability for a ship to fire broadside, a key factor when employed in a line of battle. To allow for at least partial broadside fire, Maine's superstructure was separated into three structures. This allowed both turrets to fire across the ship's deck (cross-deck fire), between the sections. This ability was limited as the superstructure restricted each turret's arc of fire.

This profile view and plan show Maine with eight six-pounder guns. Another early published plan shows the same. In both cases, the photographs show a single extreme bow mounted six-pounder and confirm that she did not carry that gun. Maine's armament setup in the bow was not identical to that of the stern, which had a single six-pounder mounted at extreme aft of the vessel. Maine carried two six-pounders forward, two on the bridge and three on the stern section, all one level above the abbreviated gun deck that permitted the ten-inch guns to fire across the deck. The six-pounders located in the bow were positioned more forward than were the pair mounted aft, which necessitated the far aft single six-pounder.

=== Propulsion ===
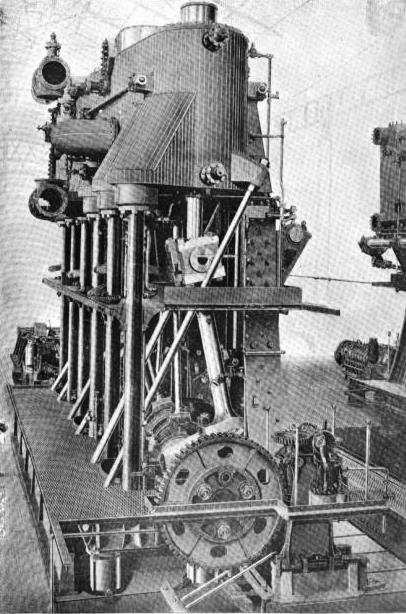
Vertical triple expansion engine of Wisconsin, similar in general layout to that of Maine

Maine was the first American capital ship for which its power plant was afforded as high a priority as was its fighting strength. Her machinery, built by the N. F. Palmer Jr. & Company's Quintard Iron Works of New York, was the first designed for a major ship under the direct supervision of Arctic explorer and future commodore George Wallace Melville. She had two inverted vertical triple-expansion steam engines, mounted in watertight compartments and separated by a fore-to-aft bulkhead, with a total designed output of 9,293 indicated horsepower (6,930 kW). Cylinder diameters were 35.5 inches (900 mm) (high pressure), 57 inches (1,400 mm) (intermediate pressure) and 88 inches (2,200 mm) (low pressure). Stroke for all three pistons was 36 inches (910 mm).

Melville mounted Maine's engines with the cylinders in vertical mode, a departure from conventional practice. Previous ships had had their engines mounted in horizontal mode so that they would be completely protected below the waterline. Melville believed that a ship's engines needed ample room to operate and that any exposed parts could be protected by an armored deck. He therefore opted for the greater efficiency, lower maintenance costs and higher speeds offered by the vertical mode. The engines were constructed with the high-pressure cylinder aft and the low-pressure cylinder forward. According to the ship's chief engineer A. W. Morley, this was done so that the low-pressure cylinder could be disconnected when the ship was under low power. This allowed the high and intermediate-power cylinders to be run together as a compound engine for efficient running.

Eight single-ended Scotch marine boilers provided steam to the engines at a working pressure of 135 pounds per square inch (930 kPa; 9.5 kgf/cm^{2}) at a temperature 364 °F (184 °C). On trials, she reached a speed of 16.45 knots (30.47 km/h; 18.93 mph), failing to meet her contract speed of 17 knots (31 km/h; 20 mph). She carried a maximum load of 896 long tons (910,000 kg) of coal in 20 bunkers, 10 on each side, which extended below the protective deck. Wing bunkers at each end of each fire room extended inboard to the front of the boilers. This was a very low capacity for a ship of Maine's rating, which limited her time at sea and her ability to run at flank speed, when coal consumption increased dramatically. Maine's overhanging main turrets also prevented coaling at sea, except in the calmest of waters; otherwise, the potential for damage to a collier, herself or both vessels was extreme.

Maine also carried two small dynamos to power her searchlights and provide interior lighting.

Maine was designed initially with a three-mast barque rig for auxiliary propulsion in case of engine failure and to aid long-range cruising. This arrangement was limited to "two-thirds" of full sail power, determined by the ship's tonnage and immersed cross-section. The mizzen mast was removed in 1892, after the ship had been launched, but before her completion. Maine was completed with a two-mast military rig and the ship never spread any canvas.

=== Armament ===
==== Main guns ====
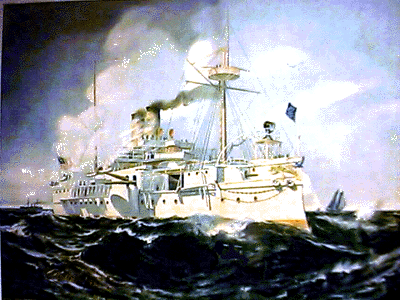
Battleship Maine by Frederick Nelson Atwood with the fore 10-inch turret visible

Maine's main armament consisted of four 10-inch (254 mm)/30-caliber Mark II guns, which had a maximum elevation of 15° and could depress to −3°. Ninety rounds per gun were carried. The ten-inch guns fired a 510-pound (231 kg) shell at a muzzle velocity of 2,000 feet per second (610 m/s) to a range of 20,000 yards (18,000 m) at maximum elevation. These guns were mounted in twin hydraulically powered Mark 3 turrets, the fore turret sponsoned to starboard and the aft turret sponsoned to port.

The 10-inch guns were initially to be mounted in open barbettes (the C & R proposal blueprint shows them as such). During Maine's extended construction, the development of rapid-fire intermediate-caliber guns, which could fire high-explosive shells, became a serious threat and the navy redesigned Maine with enclosed turrets. Because of the corresponding weight increase, the turrets were mounted one deck lower than planned originally. Even with this modification, the main guns were high enough to fire unobstructed for 180° on one side and 64° on the other side. They could also be loaded at any angle of train; initially the main guns of Texas, by comparison, with external rammers, could be loaded only when trained on the centerline or directly abeam, a common feature in battleships built before 1890. By 1897, Texas' turrets had been modified with internal rammers to permit much faster reloading.

The en echelon arrangement proved problematic. Because Maine's turrets were not counterbalanced, she heeled over if both were pointed in the same direction, which reduced the range of the guns. Also, cross-deck firing damaged her deck and superstructure significantly due to the vacuum from passing shells. Because of this, and the potential for undue hull stress if the main guns were fired end-on, the en echelon arrangement was not used in U.S. Navy designs after Maine and Texas.

==== Secondary and light guns ====
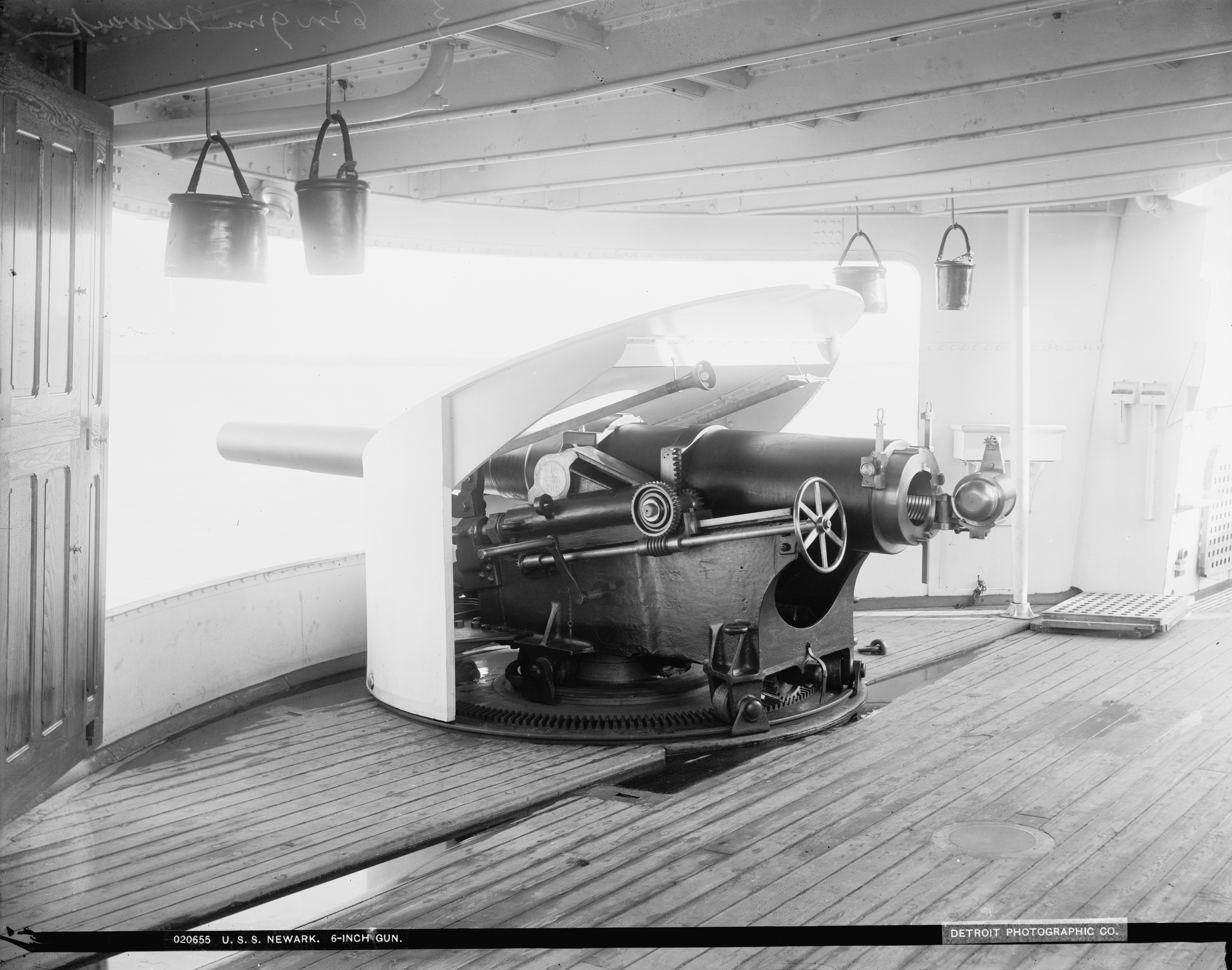
Six-inch gun on Newark. USS Maine mounted six of these.

The six 6-inch (152 mm)/30-caliber Mark 3 guns were mounted in casemates in the hull, two each at the bow and stern and the last two amidships. Data is lacking, but they could probably depress to −7° and elevate to +12°. They fired shells that weighed 105 pounds (48 kg) with a muzzle velocity of about 1,950 feet per second (590 m/s). They had a maximum range of 9,000 yards (8,200 m) at full elevation.

The anti-torpedo boat armament consisted of seven 57-millimeter (2.2 in) Driggs-Schroeder six-pounder guns mounted on the superstructure deck. They fired a shell weighing about 6 lb (2.7 kg) at a muzzle velocity of about 1,765 feet per second (538 m/s) at a rate of 20 rounds per minute to a maximum range of 8,700 yards (7,955 m). The lighter armament comprised four each 37-millimeter (1.5 in) Hotchkiss and Driggs-Schroeder one-pounder guns. Four of these were mounted on the superstructure deck, two were mounted in small casemates at the extreme stern and one was mounted in each fighting top. They fired a shell weighing about 1.1 pounds (0.50 kg) at a muzzle velocity of about 2,000 feet per second (610 m/s) at a rate of 30 rounds per minute to a range about 3,500 yards (3,200 m).

Maine had four 18-inch (457 mm) above-water torpedo tubes, two on each broadside. In addition, she was designed to carry two 14.8-long-ton (15.0 t) steam-powered torpedo boats, each with a single 14-inch (356 mm) torpedo tube and a one-pounder gun. Only one was built, but it had a top speed of only a little over 12 knots (22 km/h; 14 mph) so it was transferred to the Naval Torpedo Station at Newport, Rhode Island, as a training craft. (Note: Sources are contradictory about the size of the torpedoes carried by Maine. Friedman, Battleships and Reilly & Scheina specify 18-inch Whitehead torpedoes, but Gardiner, p. 139, and DANFS Maine say 14-inch.)

=== Armor ===
The main waterline belt, made of nickel steel, had a maximum thickness of 12 inches (305 mm) and tapered to 7 inches (178 mm) at its lower edge. It was 180 feet (54.9 m) long and covered the machinery spaces and the 10-inch magazines. It was 7 feet (2.1 m) high, of which 3 feet (0.9 m) was above the design waterline. It angled inwards for 17 feet (5.2 m) at each end, thinning to 8 inches (203 mm), to provide protection against raking fire. A six-inch transverse bulkhead closed off the forward end of the armored citadel. The forward portion of the two-inch-thick (51 mm) protective deck ran from the bulkhead all the way to the bow and served to stiffen the ram. The deck sloped downwards to the sides, but its thickness increased to 3 inches (76 mm). The rear portion of the protective deck sloped downwards towards the stern, going below the waterline, to protect the propeller shafts and steering gear. The sides of the circular turrets were 8 inches thick. The barbettes were 12 inches thick, with their lower portions reduced to 10 inches. The conning tower had 10-inch walls. The ship's voicepipes and electrical leads were protected by an armored tube 4.5 inches (114 mm) thick.

Two flaws emerged in Maine's protection, both due to technological developments between her laying-down and her completion. The first was a lack of adequate topside armor to counter the effects of rapid-fire intermediate-caliber guns and high-explosive shells. This was a flaw she shared with Texas. The second was the use of nickel-steel armor. Introduced in 1889, nickel steel was the first modern steel alloy armor and, with a figure of merit of 0.67, was an improvement over the 0.6 rating of mild steel used until then. Harvey steel and Krupp armors, both of which appeared in 1893, had merit figures of between 0.9 and 1.2, giving them roughly twice the tensile strength of nickel steel. Although all three armors shared the same density (about 40 pounds per square foot for a one-inch-thick plate), six inches of Krupp or Harvey steel gave the same protection as 10 inches of nickel. The weight thus saved could be applied either to additional hull structure and machinery or to achieving higher speed. The navy would incorporate Harvey armor in the Indiana-class battleships, designed after Maine, but commissioned at roughly the same time.

== Launching and delay ==
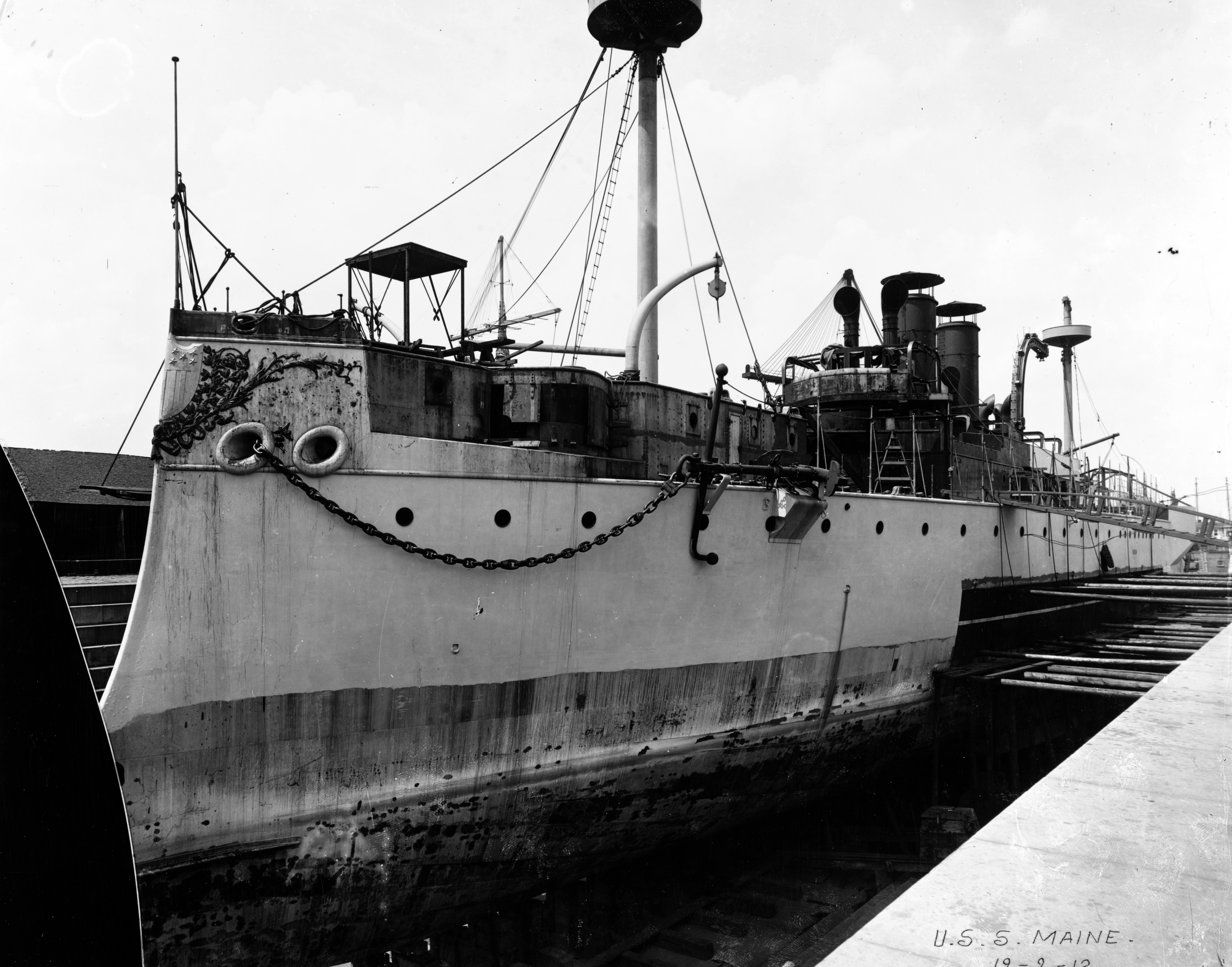
Maine in drydock at the New York Navy Yard while fitting out

Maine was launched on 18 November 1890, sponsored by Alice Tracy Wilmerding, the granddaughter of Navy Secretary Benjamin F. Tracy. Not long afterwards, a reporter wrote for Marine Engineer and Naval Architect magazine, "it cannot be denied that the navy of the United States is making rapid strides towards taking a credible position among the navies of the world, and the launch of the new armoured battleship Maine from the Brooklyn Navy Yard ... has added a most powerful unit to the United States fleet of turret ships." In his 1890 annual report to congress, the Secretary of the Navy wrote, "the Maine ... stands in a class by herself" and expected the ship to be commissioned by July 1892.

A three-year delay ensued, while the shipyard waited for nickel steel plates for Maine's armor. Bethlehem Steel had promised the navy 300 tons per month by December 1889 and had ordered heavy castings and forging presses from the British firm of Armstrong Whitworth in 1886 to fulfil its contract. This equipment did not arrive until 1889, pushing back Bethlehem's timetable. In response, Navy Secretary Benjamin Tracy secured a second contractor, the newly expanded Homestead mill of Carnegie, Phipps & Company. In November 1890, Tracy and Andrew Carnegie signed a contract for Homestead to supply 6,000 tons of nickel steel. Homestead was, what author Paul Krause calls, "the last union stronghold in the steel mills of the Pittsburgh district." The mill had already weathered one strike in 1882 and a lockout in 1889 in an effort to break the union there. Less than two years later, came the Homestead Strike of 1892, one of the largest, most serious disputes in U.S. labor history.

A photo of the christening shows Wilmerding striking the bow near the plimsoll line depth of 13, which caused speculation that the ship was "unlucky" from the launching.

== Operations ==
Maine was commissioned on 17 September 1895, under the command of Captain Arent S. Crowninshield. On 5 November 1895, Maine steamed to Sandy Hook Bay, New Jersey. She anchored there two days, then proceeded to Newport, Rhode Island, for fitting out and test firing of her torpedoes. After a trip, later that month, to Portland, Maine, she reported to the North Atlantic Squadron for operations, training maneuvers and fleet exercises. Maine spent her active career with the North Atlantic Squadron, operating from Norfolk, Virginia, along the East Coast of the United States and the Caribbean. On 10 April 1897, Captain Charles Dwight Sigsbee relieved Captain Crowninshield as commander of Maine.

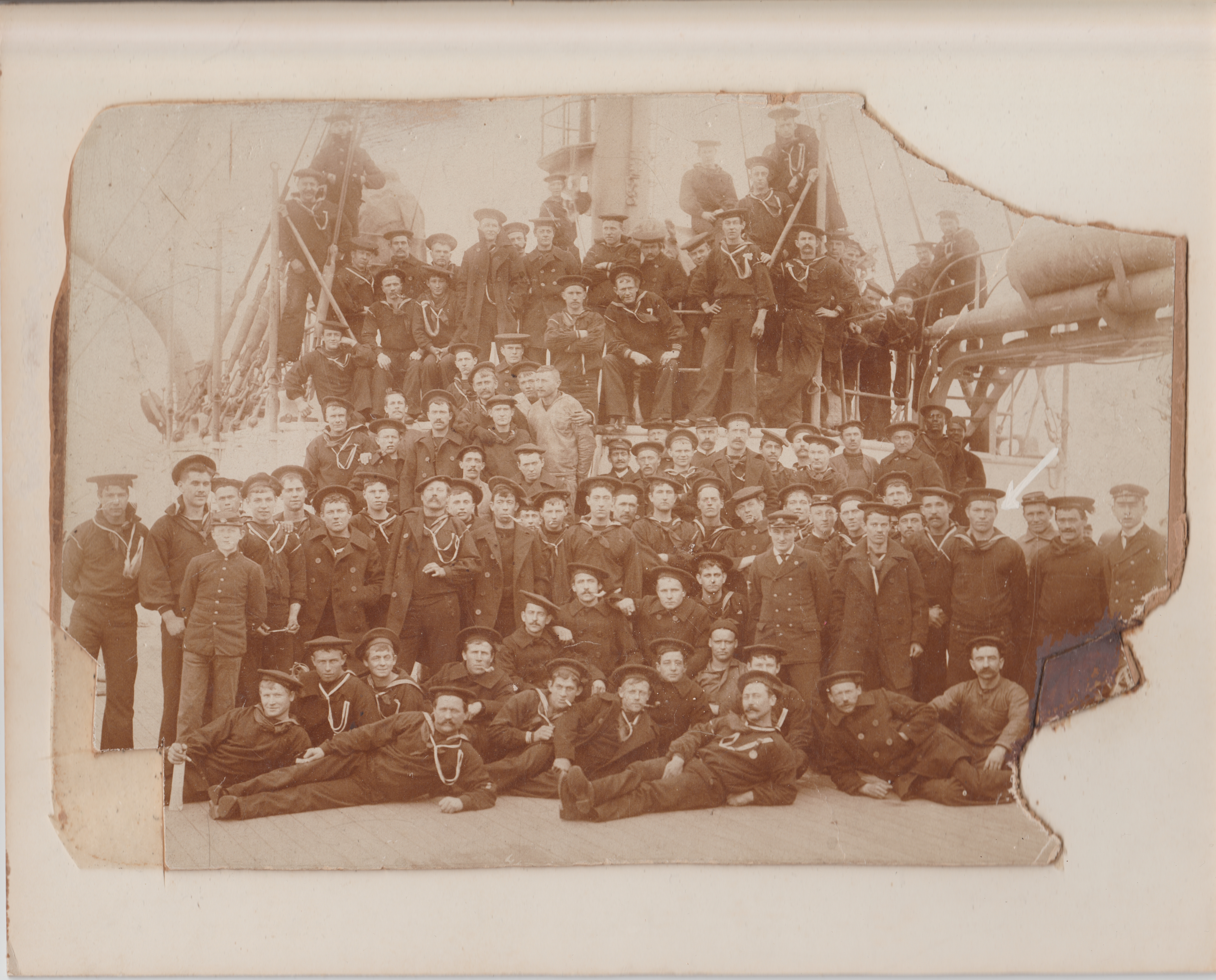
The crew of the USS Maine, prior to its sinking in Havana.

== Sinking ==
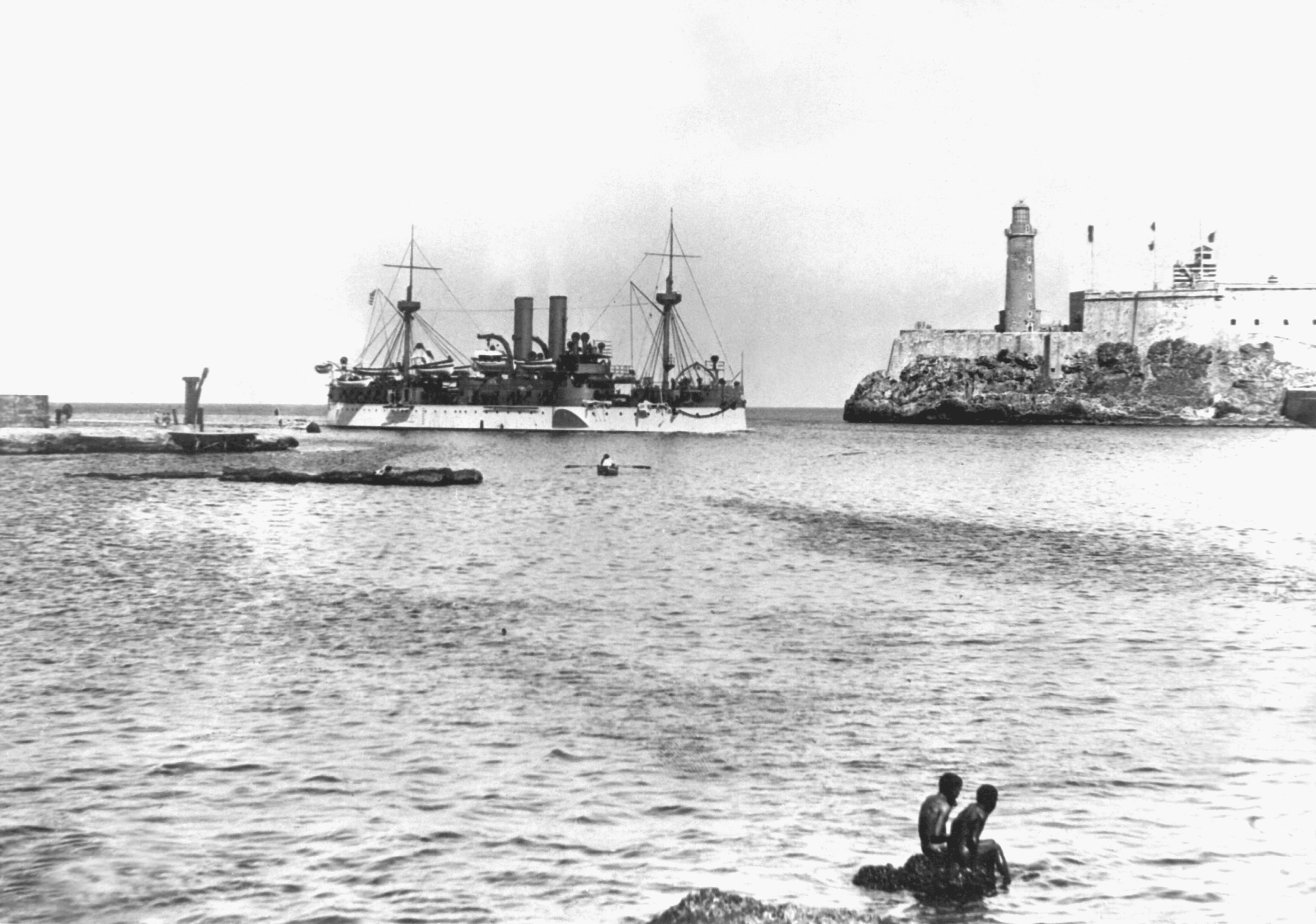
Maine entering Havana Harbor on January 25, 1898, three weeks before her destruction. On the right is the Morro Castle fortress.

In January 1898, Maine was sent from Key West, Florida, to Havana, Cuba to protect American interests during the Cuban War of Independence. She arrived at 11:00 local time on 25 January. At 21:40 on 15 February, an explosion on the Maine occurred in the Havana harbor (23°08′07″N 082°20′3″W). Later investigations revealed that more than 5 long tons (5.1 t) of powder charges for the vessel's six- and ten-inch guns had detonated, obliterating the forward third of the ship. The remaining wreckage rapidly settled to the bottom of the harbor.

Most of Maine's crew were sleeping or resting in the enlisted quarters, in the forward part of the ship, when the explosion occurred. The ship's crew consisted of 355 men: 26 officers, 290 enlisted sailors and 39 marines. Of these, there were 261 fatalities:

- Two officers and 251 enlisted sailors or marines were killed by the explosion or drowned
- Seven others were rescued but soon died of their injuries
- One officer later died of "cerebral affection" (shock)

Of the 94 survivors, 16 were uninjured. Captain Sigsbee and most of the officers survived because their quarters were in the aft portion of the ship. The City of Washington, an American merchant steamship, aided in rescuing the crew.

The cause of the accident was immediately debated. Waking President McKinley to break the news, commander Francis W. Dickins called it an "accident". Commodore George Dewey, commander of the Asiatic Squadron, "feared at first that she had been destroyed by the Spanish, which of course meant war, and I was getting ready for it when a later dispatch said it was an accident." Navy captain Philip R. Alger, an expert on ordnance and explosives, posted a bulletin at the Navy Department the next day communicating that the explosion had been caused by a spontaneous fire in the coal bunkers. Assistant Navy secretary Theodore Roosevelt wrote a letter protesting this statement, which he viewed as premature. Roosevelt argued that Alger should not have commented on an ongoing investigation, saying, "Mr. Alger cannot possibly know anything about the accident. All the best men in the Department agree that, whether probable or not, it certainly is possible that the ship was blown up by a mine."

=== Yellow journalism ===
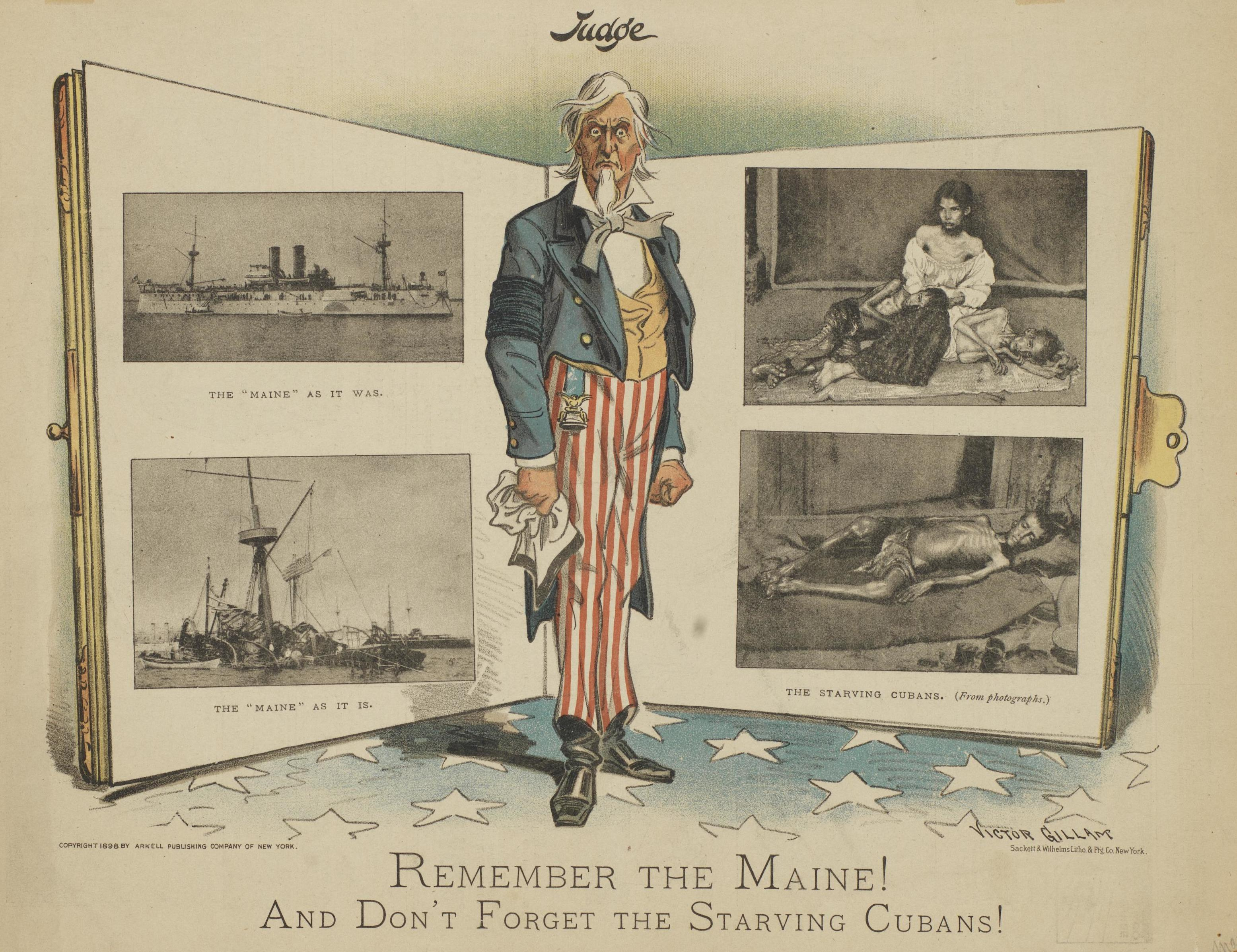
American cartoon, published in 1898: "Remember the Maine! And Don't Forget the Starving Cubans!"

The New York Journal and New York World, owned respectively by William Randolph Hearst and Joseph Pulitzer, sensationalized the Maine incident with intense press coverage, employing tactics that would later be labeled "yellow journalism". Both newspapers exaggerated and distorted much of the information they obtained, sometimes even fabricating news to fit their agendas. For a week following the sinking, the Journal devoted a daily average of eight and a half pages of news, editorials and pictures to the event. Its editors sent a full team of reporters and artists to Havana, including Frederic Remington, and Hearst announced a reward of $50,000 ($1.94 million in 2025) "for the conviction of the criminals who sent 258 American sailors to their deaths."

The World, while overall not as lurid or shrill in tone as the Journal, nevertheless indulged in similar theatrics, insisting continuously that Maine had been bombed or mined. Privately, Pulitzer felt that "nobody outside a lunatic asylum" really believed that Spain sanctioned Maine's destruction. However, his New York World insisted that the only "atonement" that Spain could offer the U.S. for the loss of ship and life was the granting of complete Cuban independence. The paper accused Spain of "treachery, willingness, or laxness" for failing to ensure the safety of Havana Harbor. Many members of the American public, already agitated over reported Spanish atrocities in Cuba, were driven to increased hysteria.

Hearst's reporting on the Maine incident generated support for military action against the Spanish in Cuba regardless of their actual involvement in the sinking. He frequently cited various naval officers saying that the explosion could not have been an on-board accident. He quoted an "officer high in authority" as saying: "The idea that the catastrophe resulted from an internal accident is preposterous. In the first place, such a thing has never occurred before that I have ever heard of either in the British navy or ours."

=== Spanish–American War ===
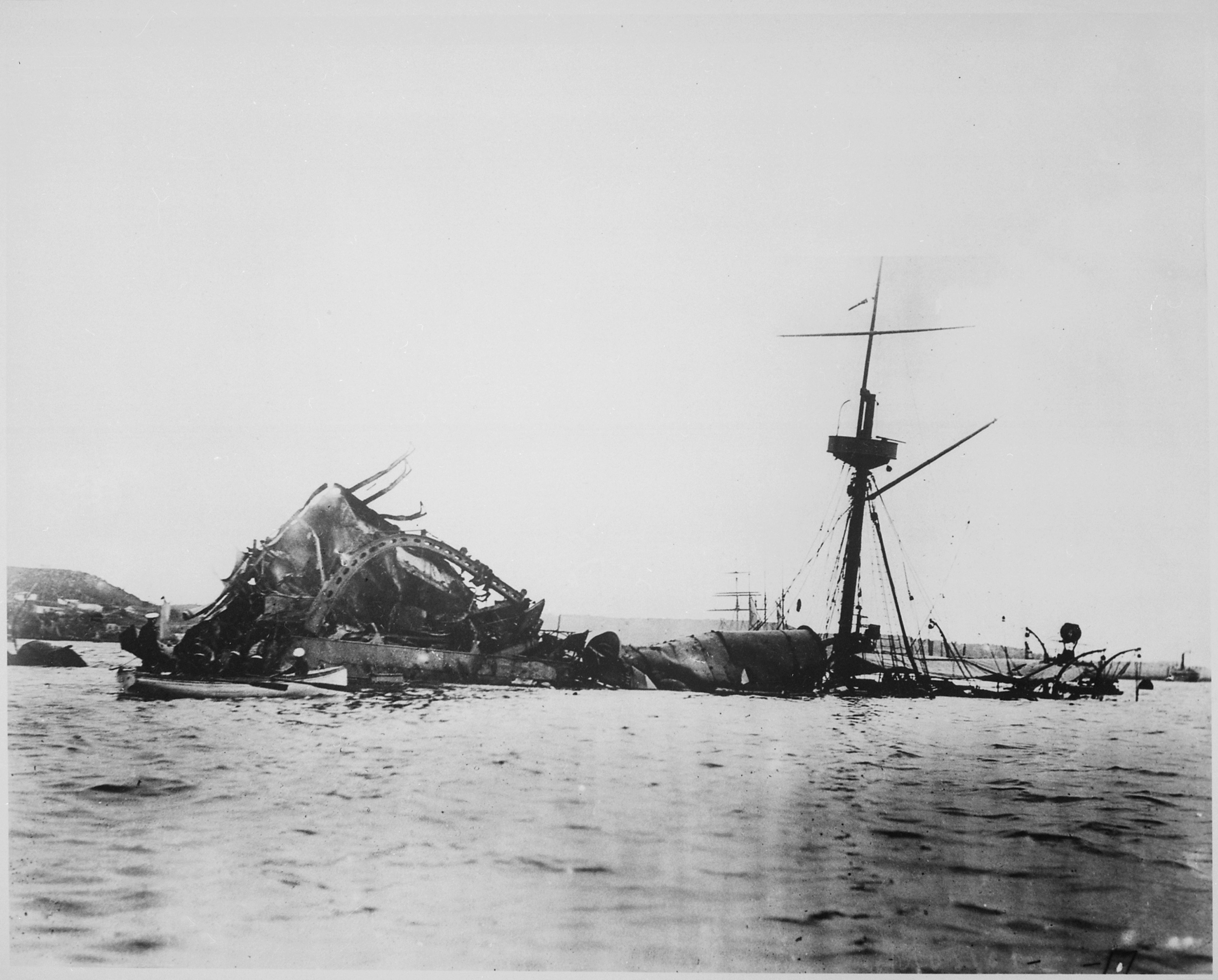
The sunken Maine in Havana harbor

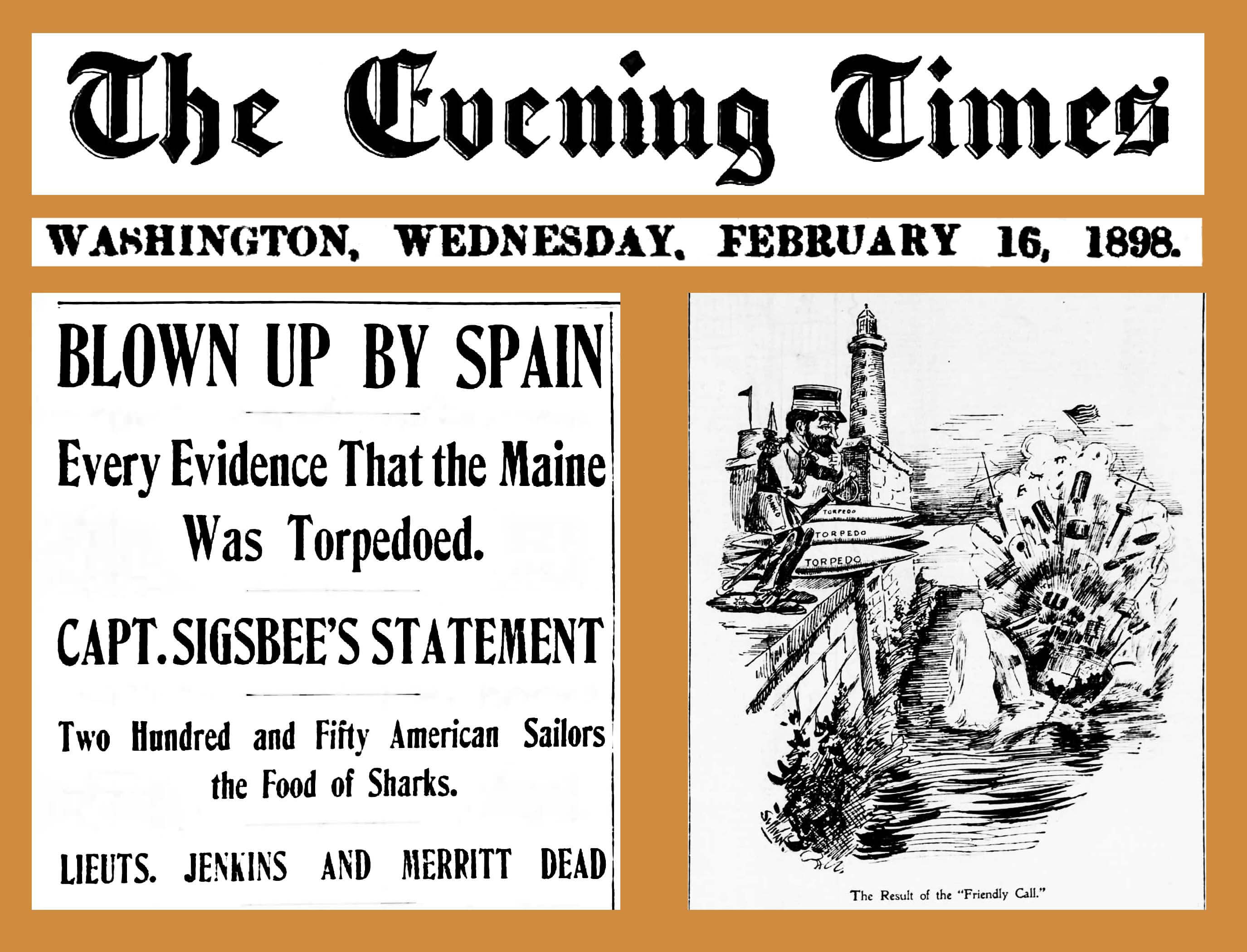
Though publication of a U.S. Navy investigation report would take a month, this Washington, D.C., newspaper was among those asserting within one day that the explosion was not accidental.

Maine's destruction did not result in an immediate declaration of war with Spain, but the event created an atmosphere that endangered a peaceful solution. The Spanish investigation found that the explosion had been caused by spontaneous combustion of the coal bunkers, but the Sampson Board ruled that the explosion had been caused by an external explosion from a torpedo.

45-star American flag with inscription "Remember the Maine"

The episode focused national attention on the crisis in Cuba. The McKinley administration did not cite the explosion as a casus belli, but others were already inclined to wage war with Spain over perceived atrocities and loss of control in Cuba. Advocates of war used the rallying cry, "Remember the Maine! To hell with Spain!" The Spanish–American War began on April 21, 1898, two months after the sinking.

== Investigations ==
In addition to the inquiry commissioned by the Spanish government to naval officers Del Peral and De Salas, two naval courts of inquiry were ordered: the Sampson Board in 1898 and the Vreeland board in 1911. In 1976, Admiral Hyman G. Rickover commissioned a private investigation, and the National Geographic Society investigated in 1998, using computer simulations. All investigations agreed that an explosion of the forward magazines caused the destruction of the ship, but different conclusions were reached regarding the exact cause of the explosion.

=== 1898 Del Peral and De Salas inquiry ===
The Spanish inquiry, conducted by Del Peral and De Salas, collected evidence from officers of naval artillery, who had examined the remains of the Maine. Del Peral and De Salas identified the spontaneous combustion of the coal bunker, located adjacent to the munition stores in Maine, as the likely cause of the explosion. The possibility that other combustibles, such as varnish, drier or alcohol products, had caused the explosion was not discounted. Additional observations included that:

- Had a mine been the cause of the explosion, a column of water would have been observed.
- The wind and the waters were calm and hence a mine could have only been detonated by electricity, but no cables had been found.
- No dead fish were found in the harbor, as would be expected following an explosion in the water.
- Munition stores do not usually explode when a ship is sunk by a mine.

The conclusions of the report were not reported at the time by the American press.

=== 1898 Sampson Board's Court of Inquiry ===
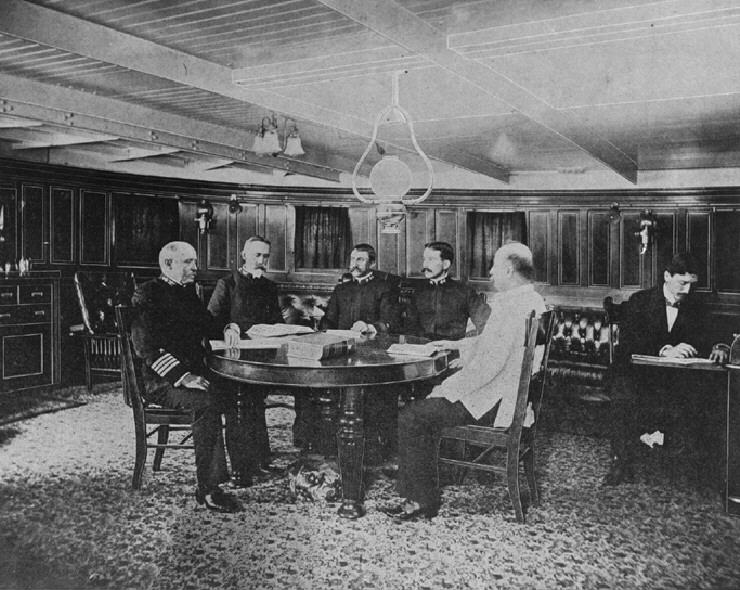
Photograph from the April 12, 1898 edition of Uncle Sam's Navy of the Sampson Board's court of inquiry meeting aboard the lighthouse tender USLHT Mangrove in Havana Harbor, ca. March 1898. From left are Captain French Ensor Chadwick, Captain William T. Sampson, Lieutenant Commander William P. Potter, Ensign W. V. Powelson and Lieutenant Commander Adolph Marix.

A naval inquiry was ordered by the United States shortly after the incident, headed by Captain William T. Sampson. Ramón Blanco y Erenas, Spanish governor of Cuba, had instead proposed a joint Spanish-American investigation. Captain Sigsbee had written that "many Spanish officers, including representatives of General Blanco, now with us to express sympathy." In a cable, the Spanish minister of colonies Segismundo Moret had advised Blanco "to gather every fact you can, to prove the Maine catastrophe cannot be attributed to us."

According to Dana Wegner, who worked with Rickover on his 1974 investigation of the sinking, the Secretary of the Navy had the option of personally selecting a board of inquiry. Instead, he resorted to protocol and assigned the commander-in-chief of the North Atlantic squadron to do so. The commander produced a list of junior line officers for the board. The fact that the officer proposed to be court president was junior to the captain of Maine, Wegner writes, "would indicate either ignorance of navy regulations or that, in the beginning, the board did not intend to examine the possibility that the ship was lost by accident and the negligence of her captain." Eventually, navy regulations prevailed in leadership of the board, Captain Sampson being senior to Captain Sigsbee.

The board arrived on 21 February and took testimony from survivors, witnesses and divers who investigated the wreck underwater. The Sampson Board produced its findings in two parts: the proceedings, which consisted mainly of testimonies, and the findings, which were the facts as determined by the court. Between the proceedings and the findings, there was what Wegner calls "a broad gap" in which the court "left no record of the reasoning that carried it from the often-inconsistent witnesses to [its] conclusion." Another inconsistency, according to Wegner, was that the board summoned only one technical witness, Commander George Converse, from the Torpedo Station at Newport, Rhode Island. Captain Sampson read Commander Converse a hypothetical situation of a coal-bunker fire igniting the reserve six-inch ammunition, with a resulting explosion sinking the ship. He then asked Commander Converse about the feasibility of such a scenario. Commander Converse "simply stated, without elaboration, that he could not realize such an event happening."

The board concluded that Maine had been destroyed by a mine, which, in turn, caused the explosion of her forward magazines. They reached this conclusion based on the fact that the majority of witnesses stated that they had heard two explosions and that part of the keel was bent inward. The official report from the board, which was presented to the Navy Department in Washington on 21 March, specifically stated the following:

"At frame 18 the vertical keel is broken in two and the flat keel is bent at an angle similar to the angle formed by the outside bottom plating. ... In the opinion of the court, this effect could have been produced only by the explosion of a mine situated under the bottom of the ship at about frame 18, and somewhat on the port side of the ship." (part of the court's 5th finding)

"In the opinion of the court, the Maine was destroyed by the explosion of a submarine mine, which caused the partial explosion of two or more of her forward magazines." (the court's 7th finding) and

"The court has been unable to obtain evidence fixing the responsibility for the destruction of the Maine upon any person or persons." (the court's 8th finding).

=== 1911 Vreeland Board's Court of Inquiry ===
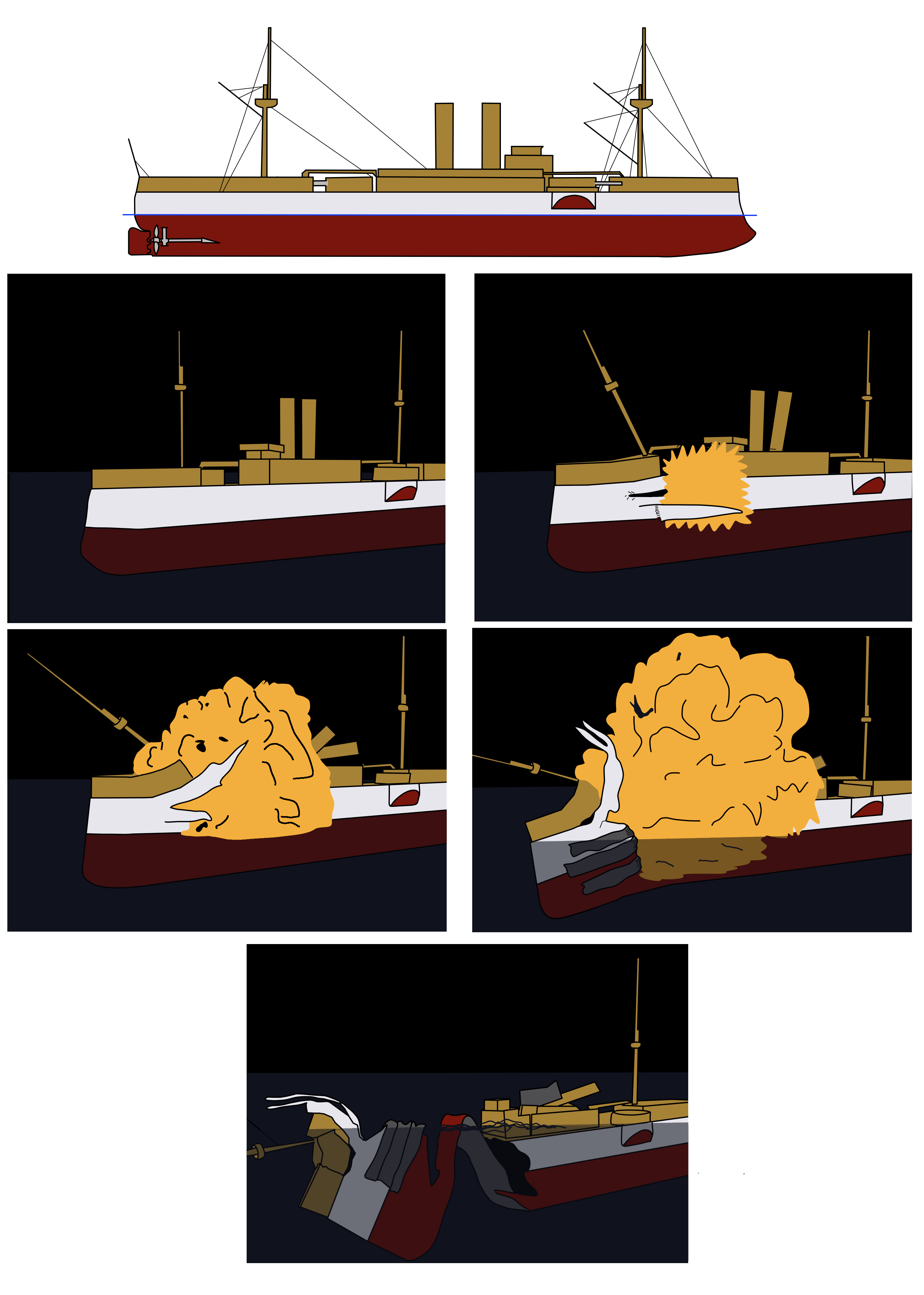
Simplistic representation of the explosion that sank USS Maine and its aftermath

In 1910, the decision was made to conduct a second court of inquiry. Doing so would also facilitate the recovery of bodies so they could be buried in the United States. The fact that the Cuban government wanted the wreck removed from Havana Harbor might also have played a role; it at least offered the opportunity to examine the wreck in greater detail than had been possible in 1898, while simultaneously obliging the newly independent Cubans. Wegner suggests that the fact that this inquiry could be held without the threat of war, which had been the case in 1898, lent it the potential for greater objectivity than had been possible previously. Moreover, as several of the members of the 1910 board would be certified engineers, they would be better qualified to evaluate their findings than had been the line officers of the 1898 board.

Beginning in December 1910, a cofferdam was built around the wreck and water was removed, exposing the wreck by late 1911. Between 20 November and 2 December 1911, a court of inquiry headed by Rear Admiral Charles E. Vreeland inspected the wreck. They concluded that an external explosion had triggered the explosion of the magazines. This explosion was farther aft and lower-powered than had been concluded by the Sampson Board. The Vreeland Board also found that the bending of frame 18 was caused by the explosion of the magazines, not by the external explosion. After the investigation, the newly located dead were buried in Arlington National Cemetery and the hollow, intact portion of the hull of Maine was refloated and ceremoniously scuttled at sea on 16 March 1912.

=== 1974 Rickover investigation ===
Admiral Hyman G. Rickover became intrigued with the disaster and began a private investigation in 1974, using information from the two official inquiries, newspapers, personal papers, and information on the construction and ammunition of Maine. He concluded that the explosion was not caused by a mine, and speculated that spontaneous combustion was the most likely cause, from coal in the bunker next to the magazine. He published a book about this investigation in 1976 entitled How the Battleship Maine Was Destroyed.

In the 2001 book Theodore Roosevelt, the U.S. Navy and the Spanish–American War, Wegner revisits the Rickover investigation and offers additional details. According to Wegner, Rickover interviewed naval historians at the Energy Research and Development Agency after reading an article in the Washington Star-News by John M. Taylor. The author claimed that the U.S. Navy "made little use of its technically trained officers during its investigation of the tragedy." The historians were working with Rickover on a study of the Navy's nuclear propulsion program, but they said that they knew no details of Maine's sinking. Rickover asked whether they could investigate the matter, and they agreed. Wegner says that all relevant documents were obtained and studied, including the ship's plans and weekly reports of the unwatering of Maine in 1912 (the progress of the cofferdam) written by William Furgueson, chief engineer for the project. These reports included numerous photos annotated by Furgueson with frame and strake numbers on corresponding parts of the wreckage. Two experts were brought in to analyze the naval demolitions and ship explosions. They concluded that the photos showed "no plausible evidence of penetration from the outside," and they believed that the explosion originated inside the ship.

Wegner suggests that a combination of naval ship design and a change in the type of coal used to fuel naval ships might have facilitated the explosion postulated by the Rickover study. Up to the time of the Maine's building, he explains, common bulkheads separated coal bunkers from ammunition lockers, and American naval ships burned smokeless anthracite coal. With an increase in the number of steel ships, the Navy switched to bituminous coal, which burned at a hotter temperature than anthracite coal and allowed ships to steam faster. Wegner explains that anthracite coal is not subject to spontaneous combustion, but bituminous coal is considerably more volatile and is known for releasing the largest amounts of firedamp, a dangerous and explosive mixture of gases (chiefly methane). Firedamp is explosive at concentrations between 4% and 16%, with most violence at around 10%. In addition, there was another potential contributing factor in the bituminous coal: iron sulfide, also known as pyrite, was likely present. The presence of pyrites presents two additional risk factors, the first involving oxidation. Pyrite oxidation is sufficiently exothermic that underground coal mines in high-sulfur coal seams have occasionally experienced spontaneous combustion in the mined-out areas of the mine. This process can result from the disruption caused by mining from the seams, which exposes the sulfides in the ore to air and water. The second risk factor involves an additional capability of pyrites to provide fire ignition under certain conditions. Pyrites derive their name from the Greek root word pyr, meaning fire, as they can cause sparks when struck by steel or other hard surfaces. Pyrites were used to strike sparks to ignite gunpowder in wheellock guns, for example. The pyrites could have provided the ignition capability needed to create an explosion. A number of bunker fires of this type had been reported aboard warships before the Maine's explosion, in several cases nearly sinking the ships. Wegner also cites a 1997 heat transfer study that concluded that a coal bunker fire could have taken place and ignited the ship's ammunition.

=== 1998 National Geographic investigation ===
In 1998, National Geographic magazine commissioned an analysis by Advanced Marine Enterprises (AME). This investigation, done to commemorate the centennial of the sinking of USS Maine, was based on computer modeling, a technique unavailable for previous investigations. The results reached were inconclusive. National Geographic reported that "a fire in the coal bunker could have generated sufficient heat to touch off an explosion in the adjacent magazine [but] on the other hand, computer analysis also shows that even a small, handmade mine could have penetrated the ship's hull and set off explosions within." The AME investigation noted that "the size and location of the soil depression beneath the Maine 'is more readily explained by a mine explosion than by magazine explosions alone'." The team noted that this was not "definitive in proving that a mine was the cause of the sinking" but it did "strengthen the case."

Some experts, including Rickover's team and several analysts at AME, do not agree with the conclusion. Wegner claims that technical opinion among the Geographic team was divided between its younger members, who focused on computer modeling results, and its older ones, who weighed their inspection of photos of the wreck with their own experience. He adds that AME used flawed data concerning the Maine's design and ammunition storage. Wegner was also critical of the fact that participants in the Rickover study were not consulted until AME's analysis was essentially complete, far too late to confirm the veracity of data being used or engage in any other meaningful cooperation.

=== 2002 Discovery Channel Unsolved History investigation ===
In 2002, the Discovery Channel produced an episode of the Unsolved History documentaries, entitled "Death of the U.S.S. Maine". It used photographic evidence, naval experts, and archival information to argue that the cause of the explosion was a coal bunker fire, and it identified a weakness or gap in the bulkhead separating the coal and powder bunkers that allowed the fire to spread from the former to the latter.

=== False flag operation conspiracy theories ===
Several claims have been made in Spanish-speaking media that the sinking was a false flag operation conducted by the U.S. and those claims are the official view in Cuba. The Maine monument in Havana describes Maine's sailors as "victims sacrificed to the imperialist greed in its fervor to seize control of Cuba" and claims that American agents deliberately blew up their own ship.

Eliades Acosta was the head of the Cuban Communist Party's Committee on Culture and a former director of the José Martí National Library in Havana. He offered the standard Cuban interpretation in an interview to The New York Times, but he adds that "Americans died for the freedom of Cuba, and that should be recognized." This claim has also been made in Russia by Mikhail Khazin, a Russian economist who once ran the cultural section at Komsomolskaya Pravda, and in Spain by Eric Frattini, a Spanish Peruvian journalist in his book Manipulando la historia. Operaciones de Falsa Bandera. Del Maine al Golpe de estado de Turquía.

Operation Northwoods was a series of proposals prepared by Pentagon officials for the Joint Chiefs of Staff in 1962, setting out a number of proposed false flag operations that could be blamed on the Cuban Communists in order to rally support against them. One of these suggested that a U.S. Navy ship be blown up in Guantanamo Bay deliberately. In an echo of the yellow press headlines of the earlier period, it used the phrase "A 'Remember the Maine' incident".

== Raising and final sinking ==
For several years, Maine was left where she sank in Havana harbor, but it was evident she would have to be removed sometime. The wreck took up valuable space in the harbor, and the buildup of silt around her hull threatened to create a shoal. In addition, various patriotic groups wanted mementos of the ship. On 9 May 1910, Congress authorized funds for the removal of Maine, the proper interment in Arlington National Cemetery of the estimated 70 bodies still inside, and the removal and transport of the main mast to Arlington. Congress did not demand a new investigation into the sinking at that time.

The Army Corps of Engineers built a cofferdam around the ship and pumped water out from inside it. By 30 June 1911, Maine's main deck was exposed, revealing just how damaged the ship was: Forward of frame 41 was completely destroyed, leaving only a twisted mass of steel that bore no resemblance to a bow, and the rest of the wreck was severely corroded. When the water was fully drained, army engineers used oxyacetylene torches to cut away the damaged superstructure and decks. Then, midway through the wreck, they cut away what was left of the forward portion of the ship and built a concrete and wooden bulkhead to seal the after-section. Holes were cut in the bottom of the after-section, through which jets of water were pumped, to break the mud seal holding the ship, then plugged, with flood cocks, which would later be used for sinking the ship. Maine had been outfitted with Worthington steam pumps. After lying on the bottom of Havana harbor for fourteen years these pumps were found to be still operational; they were subsequently cleaned and used by the Army Corps of Engineers to aid them in their work on the wreck.

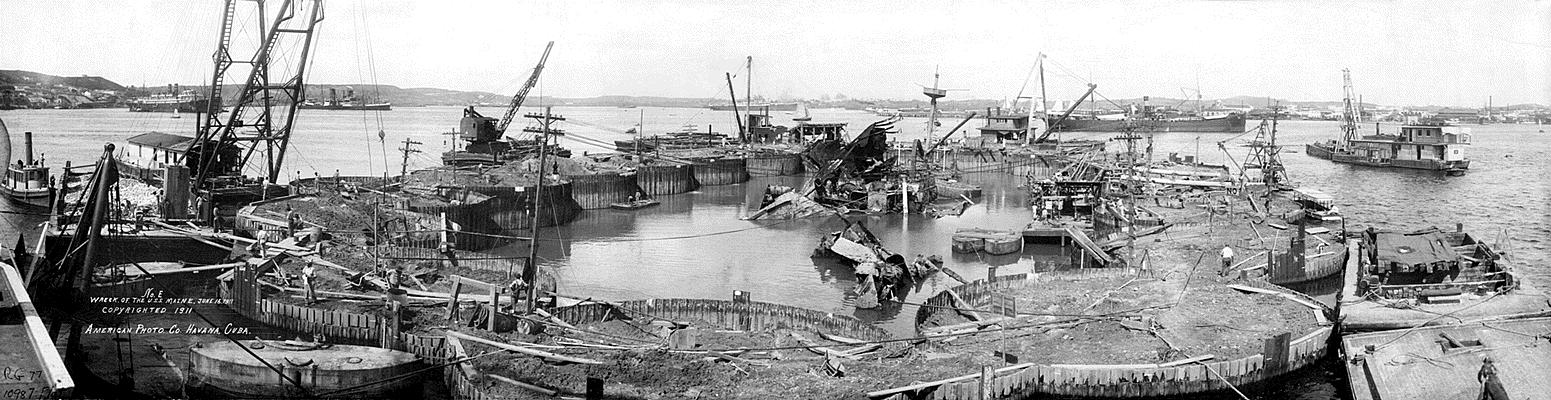
Wreckage of Maine surrounded by a cofferdam, on 16 June 1911

During the salvage, the remains of 66 men were found, of whom only one, Harry J. Keys (an engineering officer), was identified and returned to his home town; the rest were reburied at Arlington National Cemetery, making a total of 229 Maine crew buried there. All recovered bodies were removed to the armored cruiser North Carolina for repatriation. Finally, on 13 February 1912, the engineers let water back into the interior of the cofferdam. Three days later, the interior of the cofferdam was full and the extant after-section of the ship was refloated. Two days after that, Maine was towed out by the tug Osceola. On 16 March, she was towed four miles from the Cuban coast by Osceola, escorted by North Carolina and the light cruiser Birmingham. She was loaded with dynamite as a possible aid to her sinking. Flowers adorned Maine's deck, and an American flag was strung from her jury mast. At 5 p.m. local time, with a crowd of over 100,000 persons watching from the shore, her sea cocks were opened, and just over twenty minutes later, Maine sank, bow first, in 600 fathoms (3,600 ft; 1,100 m) of water, to the sound of Taps and a twenty-one gun salute, courtesy of the men aboard Birmingham and North Carolina.

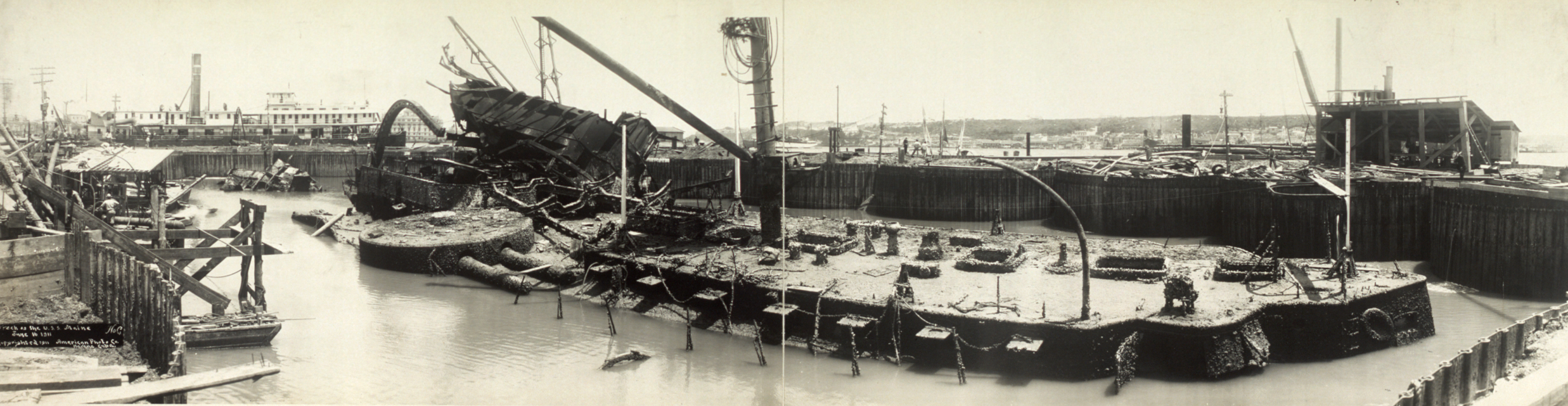
A portside view of the wreck

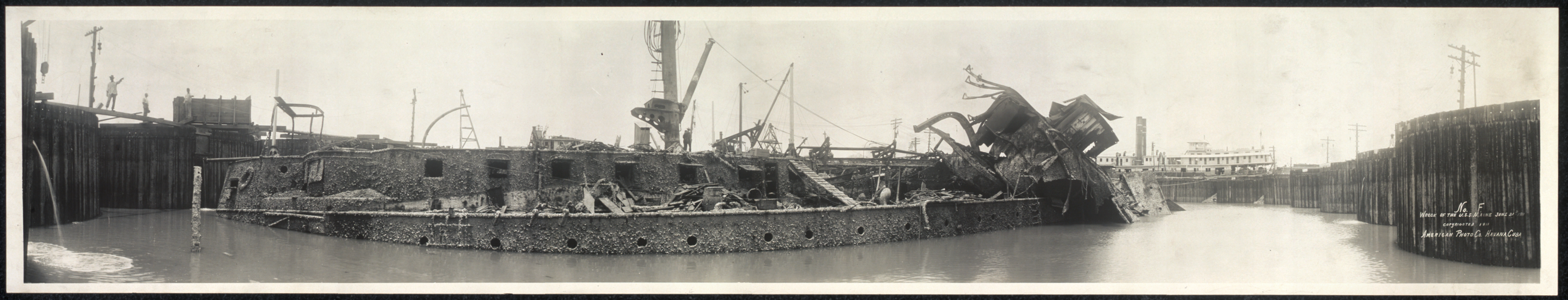
A starboardside view of the wreck

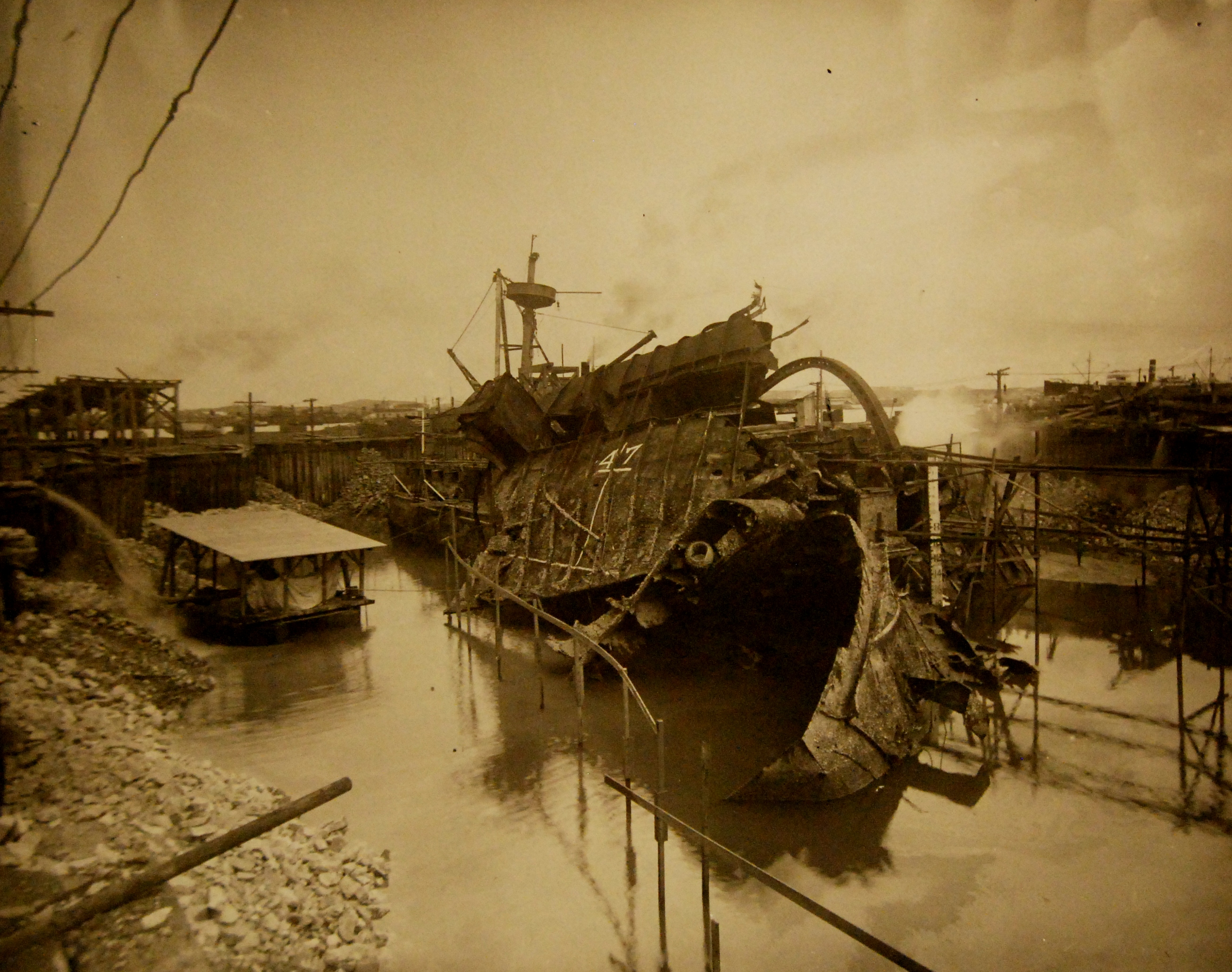
The largely destroyed bow of USS Maine

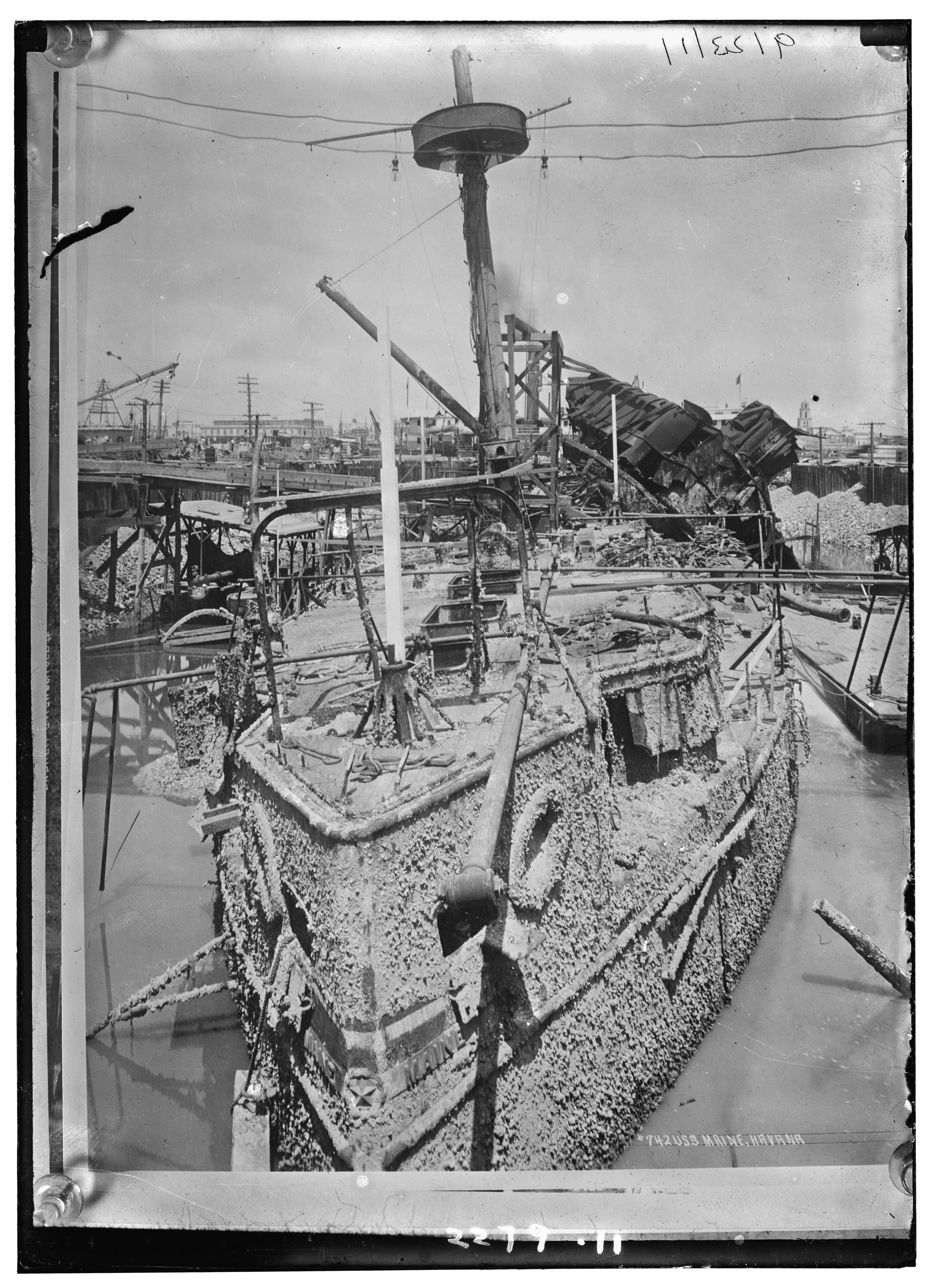
The stern of USS Maine following the draining of the cofferdam

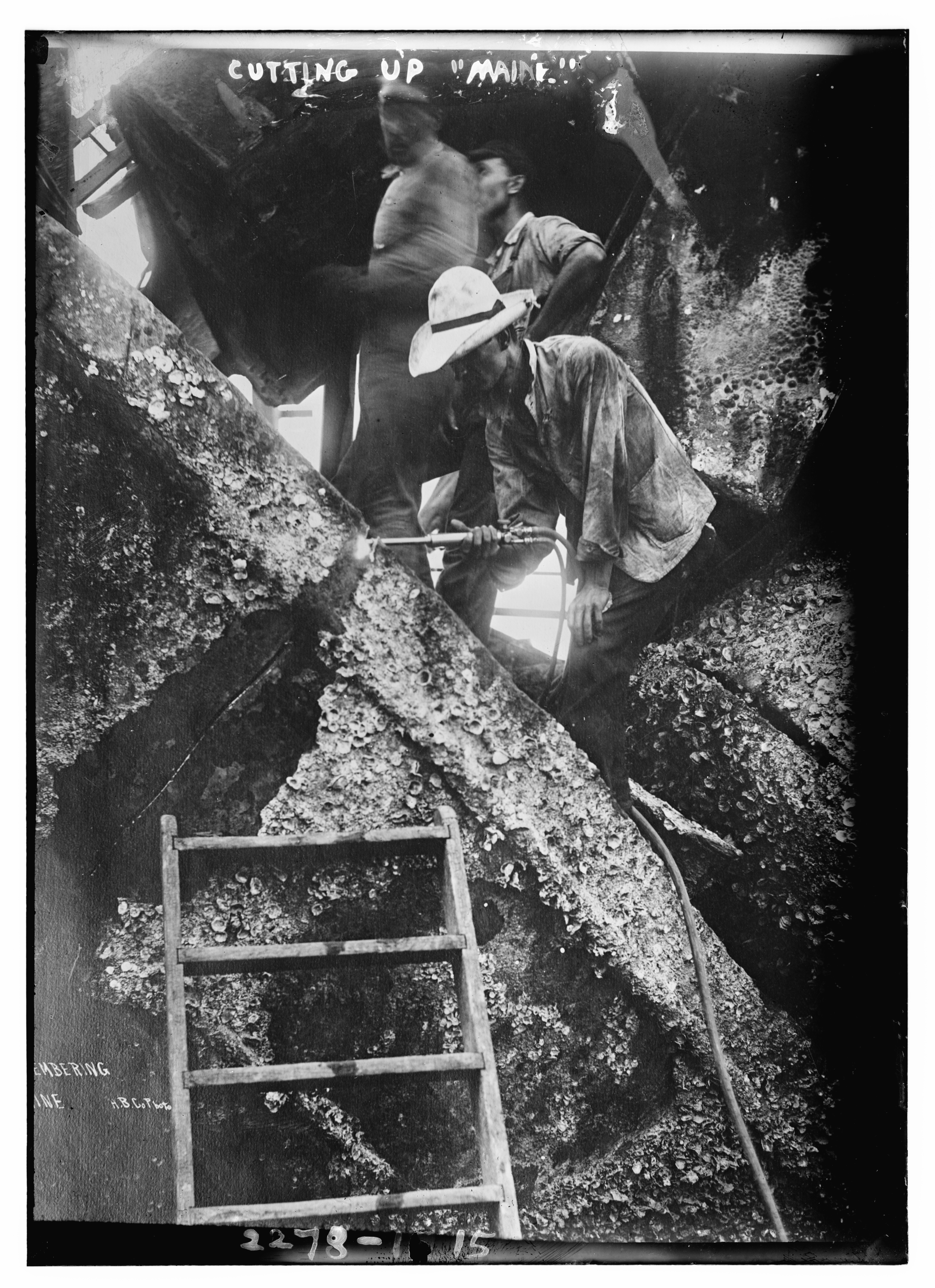
An army engineer uses an oxyacetylene torch to cut up the wreck

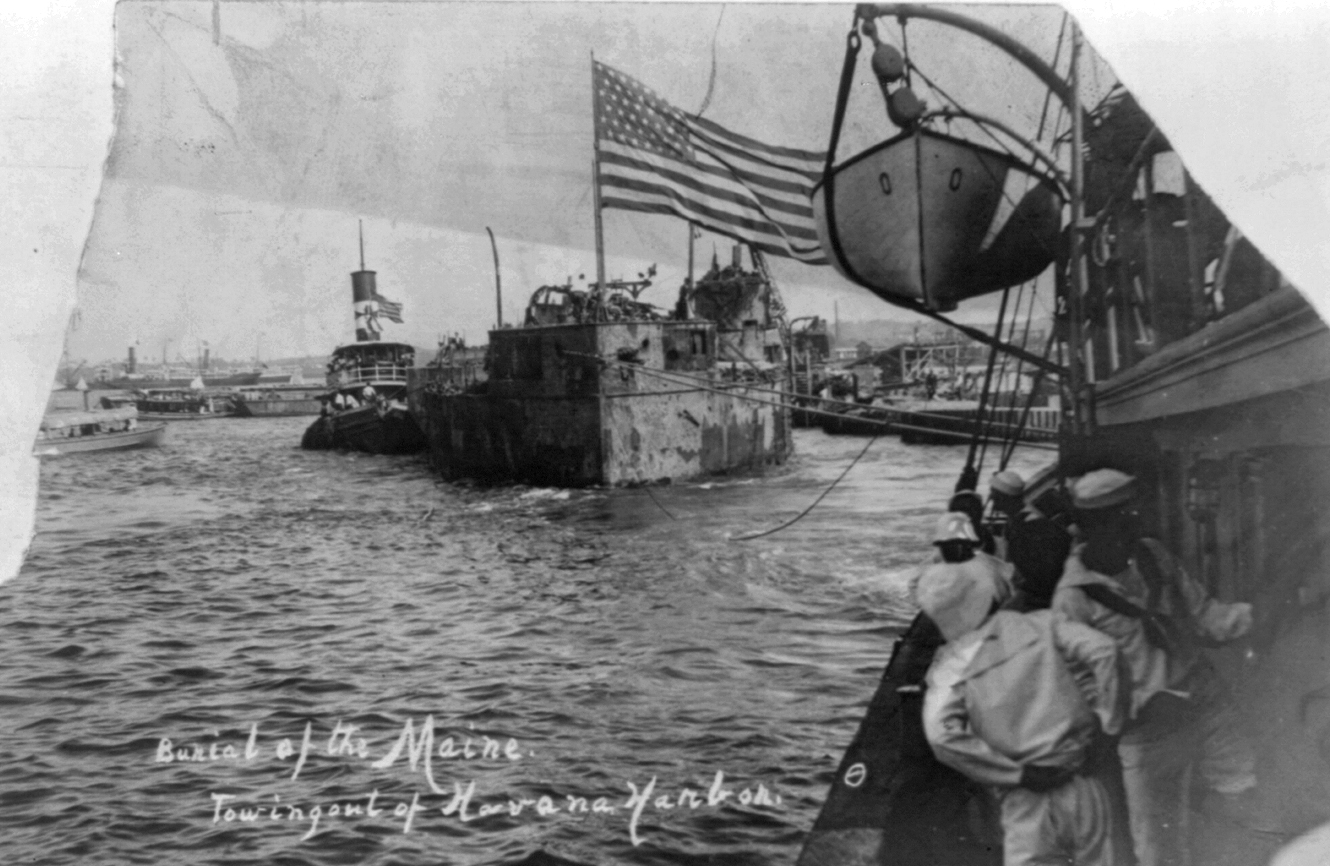
The refloated stern is towed out of Havana Harbor,

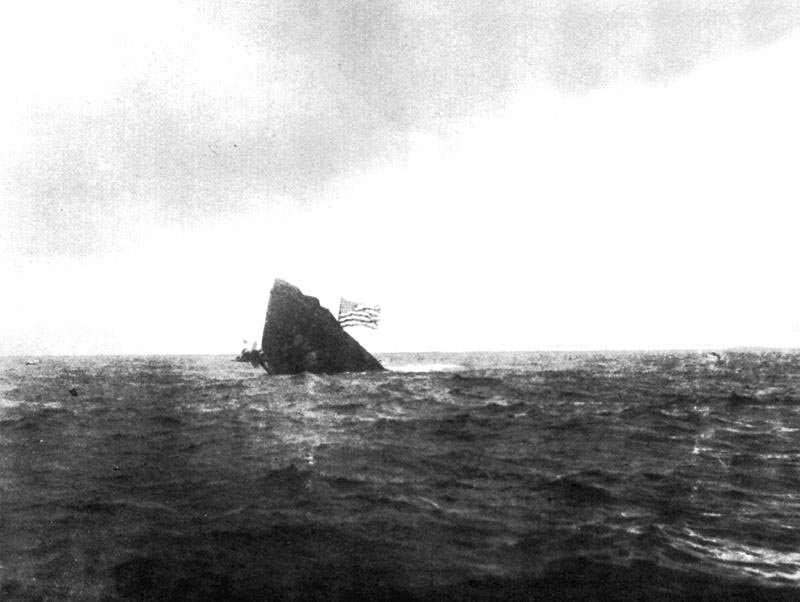
USS Maine sinking after being scuttled off the shore of Cuba

== Rediscovery ==
On 18 October 2000, the wreck of Maine was rediscovered in about 3,770 feet (1,150 m) of water roughly 3 miles (4.8 km) northeast of Havana Harbor by Advanced Digital Communications, a Toronto-based expedition company. The team, led by marine engineer Paulina Zelitsky, accidentally stumbled across the ship while working with Cuban scientists and oceanographers from the University of South Florida College of Marine Science to test underwater exploration technology. The researchers, who referred to the wreck as the "square" due to its unique shape, did not initially believe it to be the Maine, since the ship was discovered east of where it was reportedly scuttled. (This displacement was likely due to currents pushing the ship as it sank.) Once the team began to explore the wreck with a remotely operated underwater vehicle (ROV), they discovered that the hull had not overly oxidized, allowing them to "see all of [the ship's] structural parts." The researchers confirmed the ship's identity both by scrutinizing the design of its doors, hatches, anchor chain, and propellers, and by identifying the telltale bulkhead that had been created when the bow was removed in 1912. Near the wreck, the team also located a boiler and a debris field of coal.

== Memorials ==
=== Arlington, Annapolis, Havana, Key West ===
In February 1898, the recovered bodies of sailors who died on Maine were interred in the Colon Cemetery, Havana. Some injured sailors were sent to hospitals in Havana and Key West, Florida. Those who died in hospitals were buried in Key West. In December 1899, the bodies in Havana were disinterred and brought back to the United States for burial at Arlington National Cemetery. In 1915, President-elect Woodrow Wilson dedicated the USS Maine Mast Memorial to those who died. The memorial includes the ship's main mast. Roughly 165 were buried at Arlington, although the remains of one sailor were exhumed for his home town, Indianapolis, Indiana. Of the rest, only 62 were known. Nine bodies were never recovered and 19 crewmen, several unidentified, are buried in Key West Cemetery under a statue of a U.S. sailor holding an oar. (Note: Besides one set of remains removed from Arlington and reburied in 1899, and one set of remains recovered in 1911 and buried in the person's hometown, two other sets were also buried elsewhere. See U.S. Army Quartermaster (1913). US Army Quartermaster Report of 1912. U.S. War Department. p. 511.)

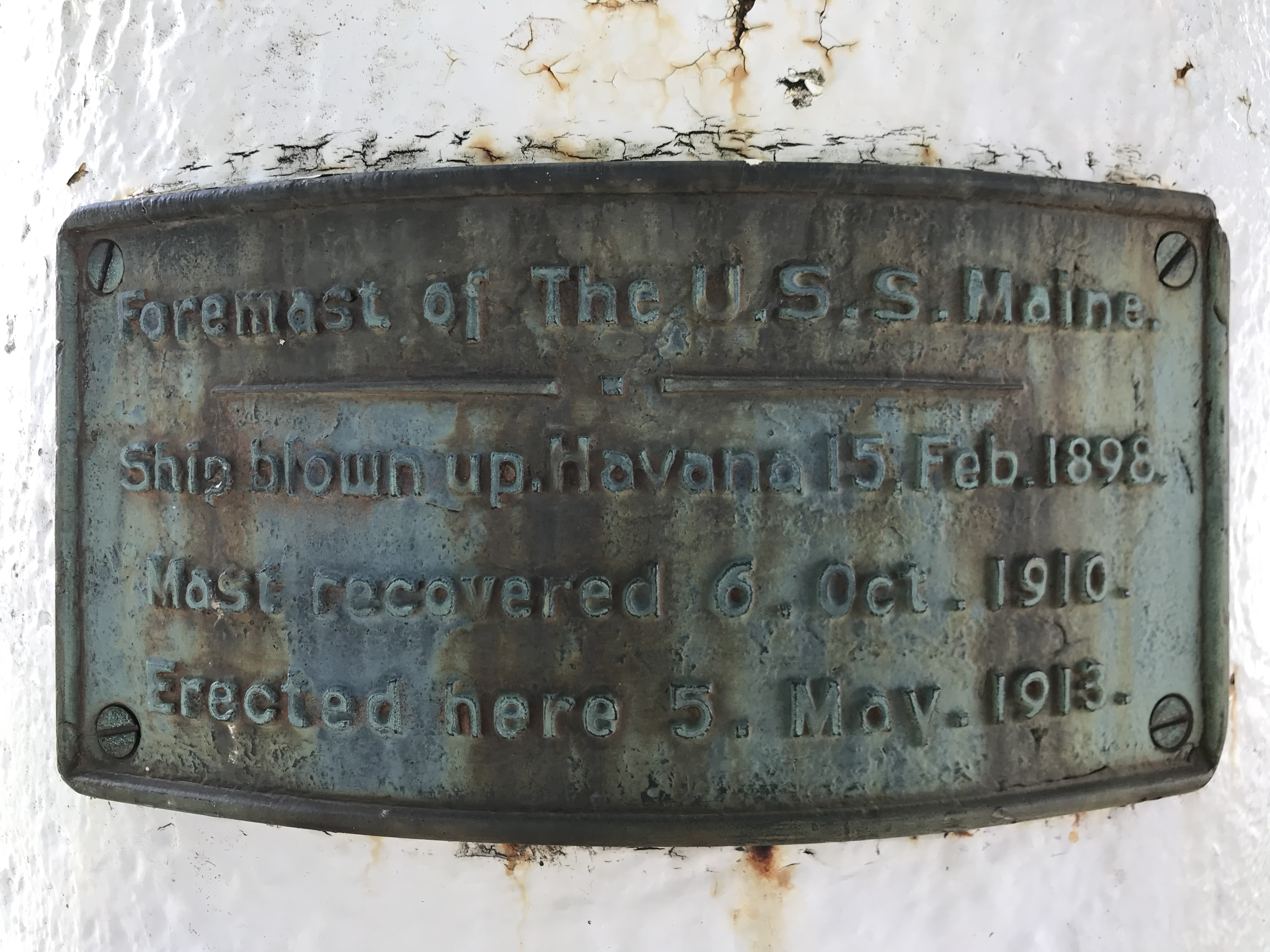
Memorial plaque installed on the foremast of the Maine located at the United States Naval Academy, reading: "Foremast of The USS Maine. Ship blown up, Havana 15, Feb, 1898. Mast recovered 6, Oct, 1910. Erected here 5, May, 1913."

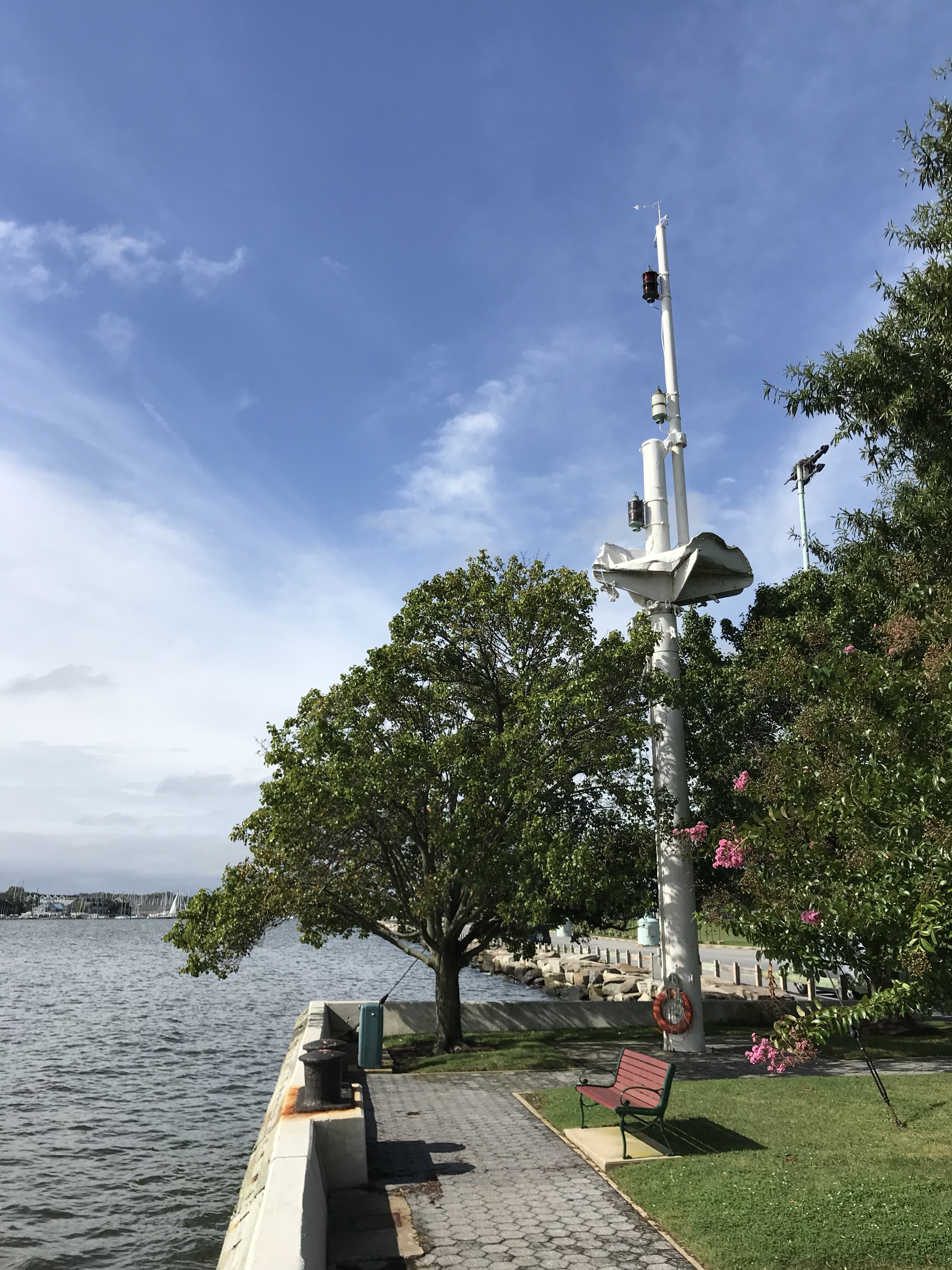
The foremast of the Maine located at the United States Naval Academy, Annapolis, Maryland

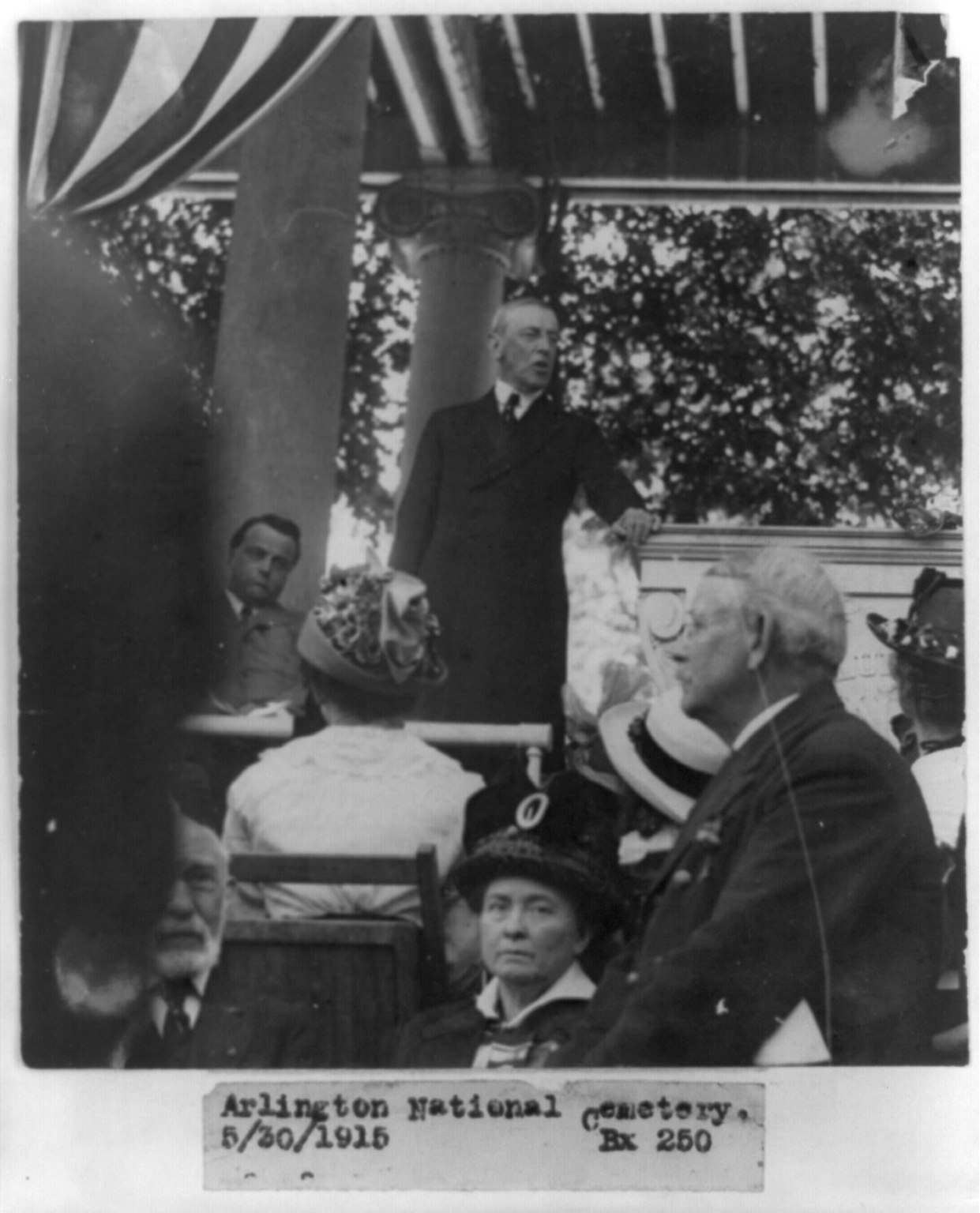
Woodrow Wilson dedicates the memorial site at Arlington National Cemetery (May 30, 1915)

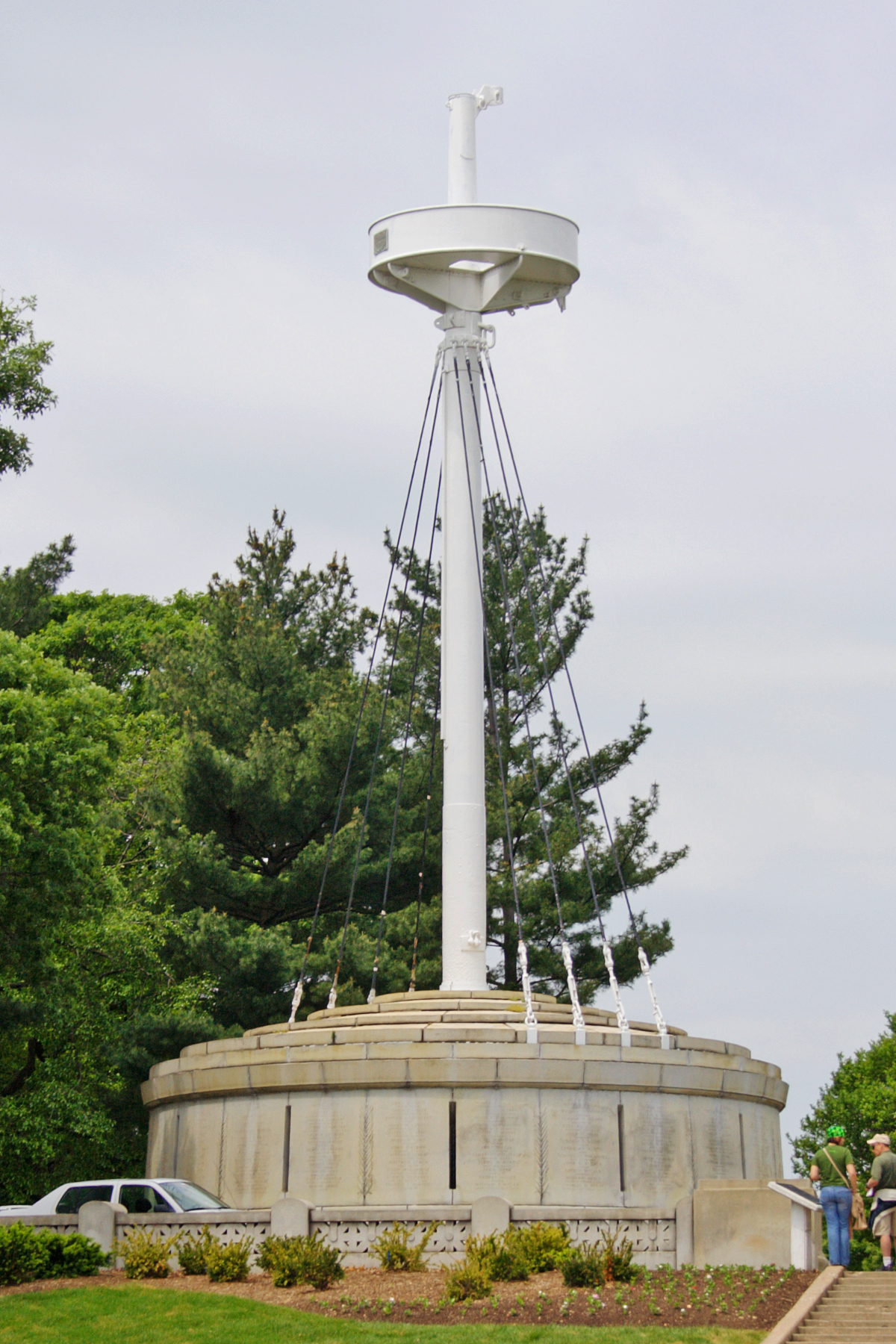
Memorial at Arlington National Cemetery centered on the ship's main mast

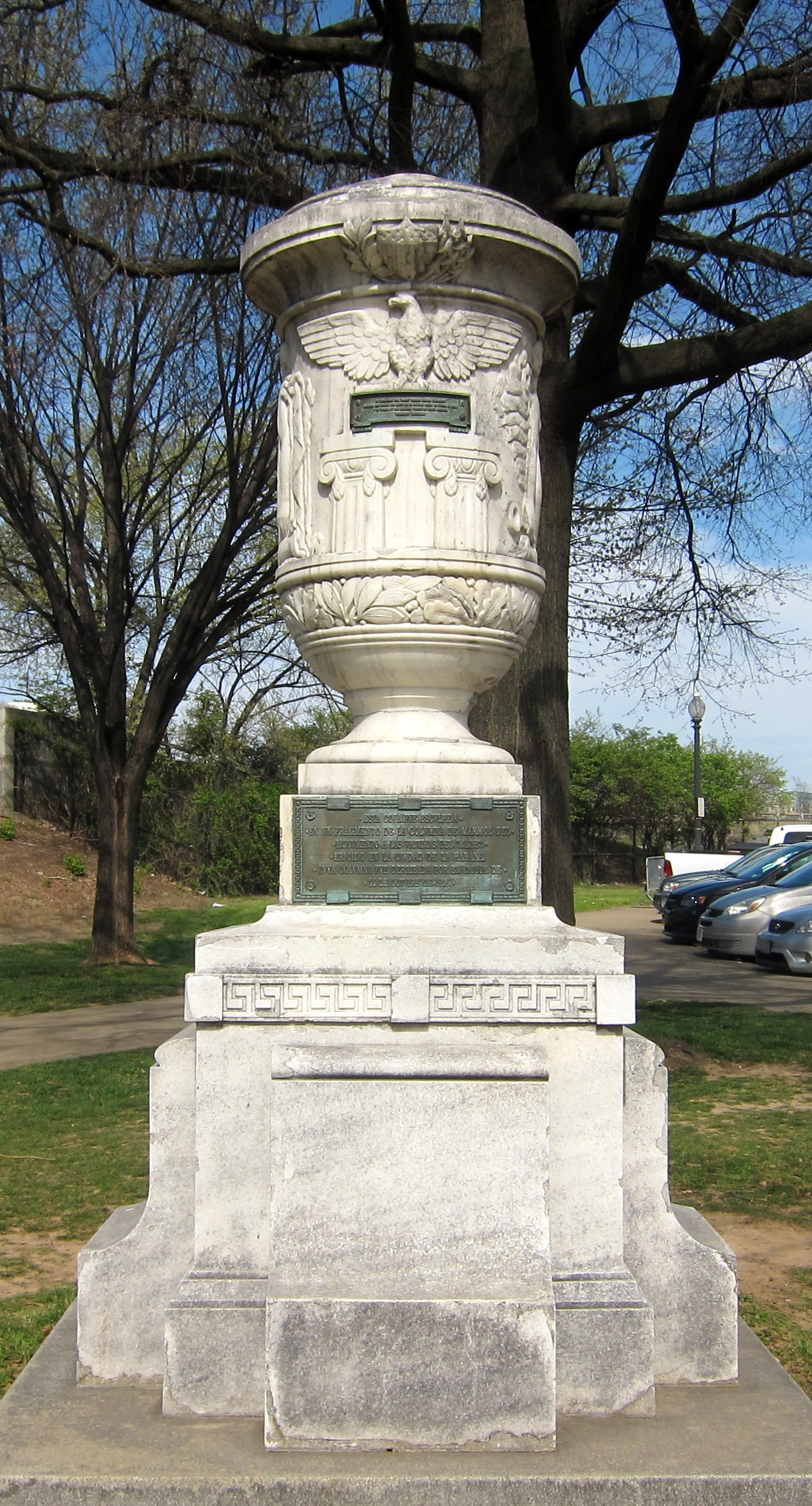
The Cuban Friendship Urn on Ohio Drive, Southwest, Washington, D.C., East Potomac Park

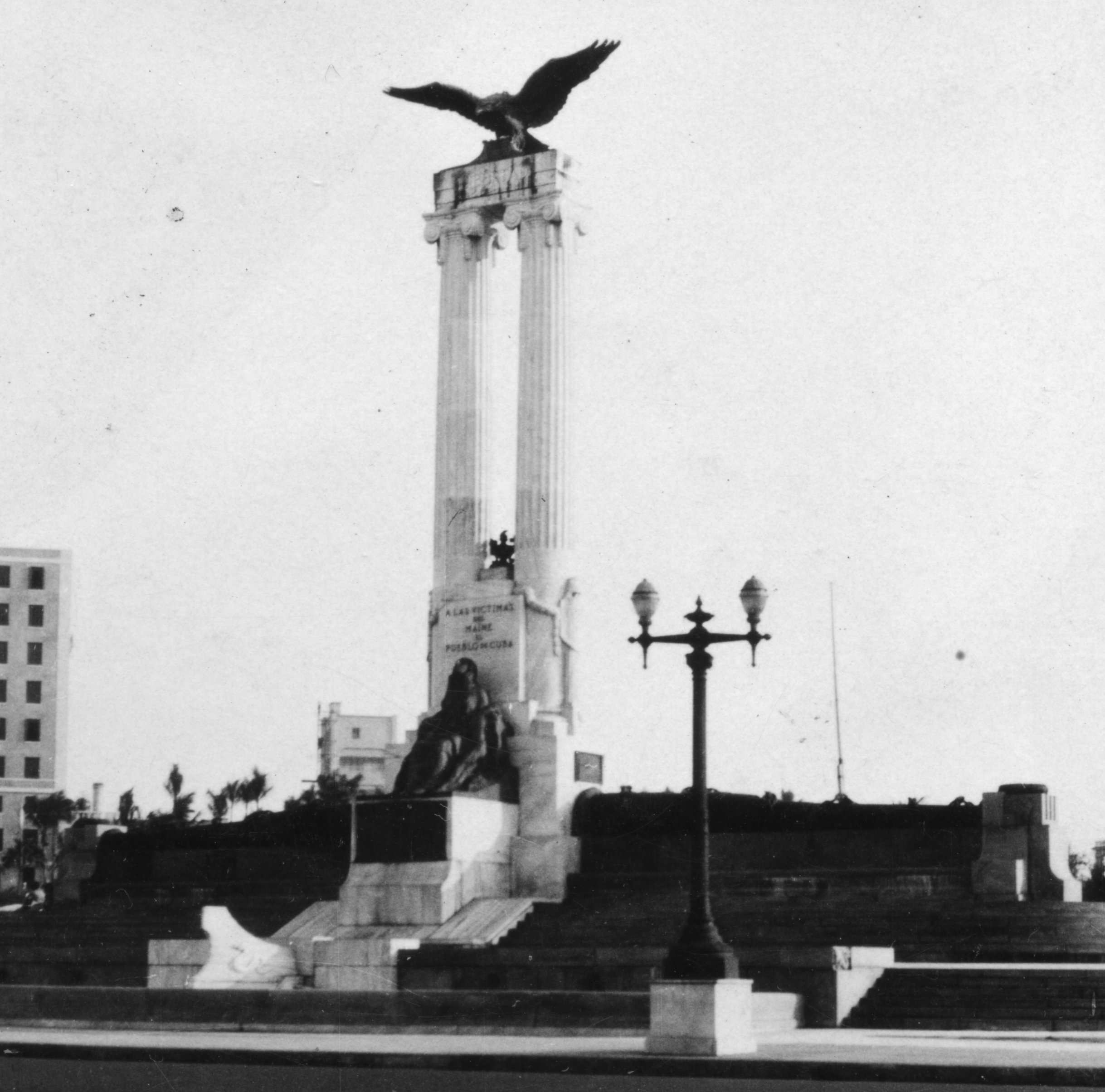
Monument to victims of Maine in Havana, Cuba, c. 1930

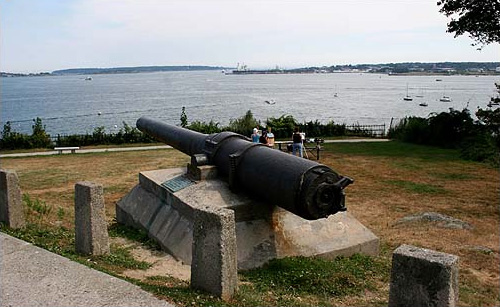
A 6-inch gun from Maine at Fort Allen Park in Portland, Maine

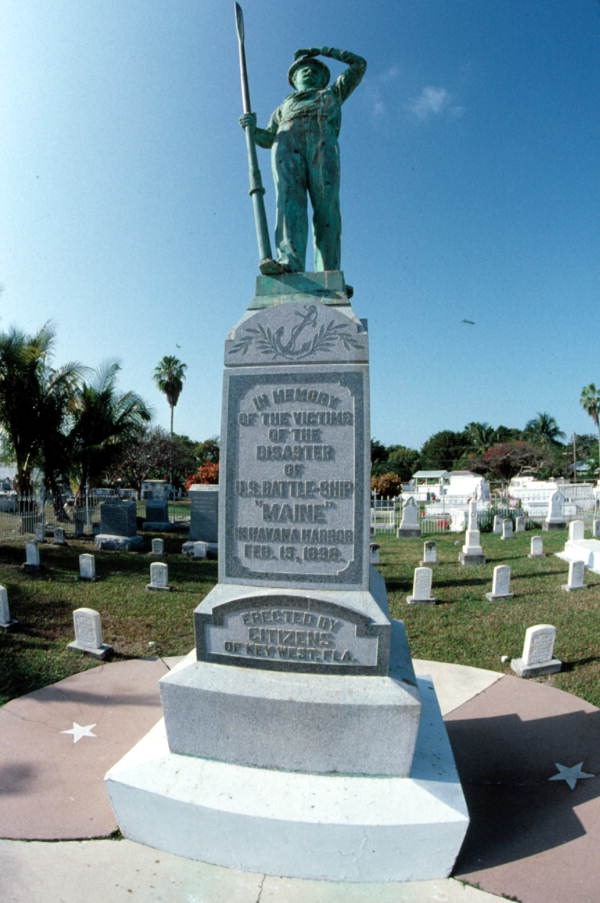
U.S. Battleship Maine Monument Key West Cemetery, Florida

The explosion-bent fore mast of Maine is located at the United States Naval Academy.

In 1926, the Cuban government erected a memorial to the victims of Maine on the Malecon, near the Hotel Nacional, to commemorate United States assistance in acquiring Cuban independence from Spain. The monument features two of Maine's four 10-inch guns. In 1961, the memorial was damaged by crowds, following the Bay of Pigs Invasion, and the eagle on top was broken and removed. The Communist government then added its own inscription blaming "imperialist voracity in its eagerness to seize the island of Cuba" for Maine's sinking. The monument was cleaned and restored in 2013. The eagle's head was retained by the U.S. Interests Section in Havana, and the body by the city's museum.

=== USS Maine Monument, New York City ===
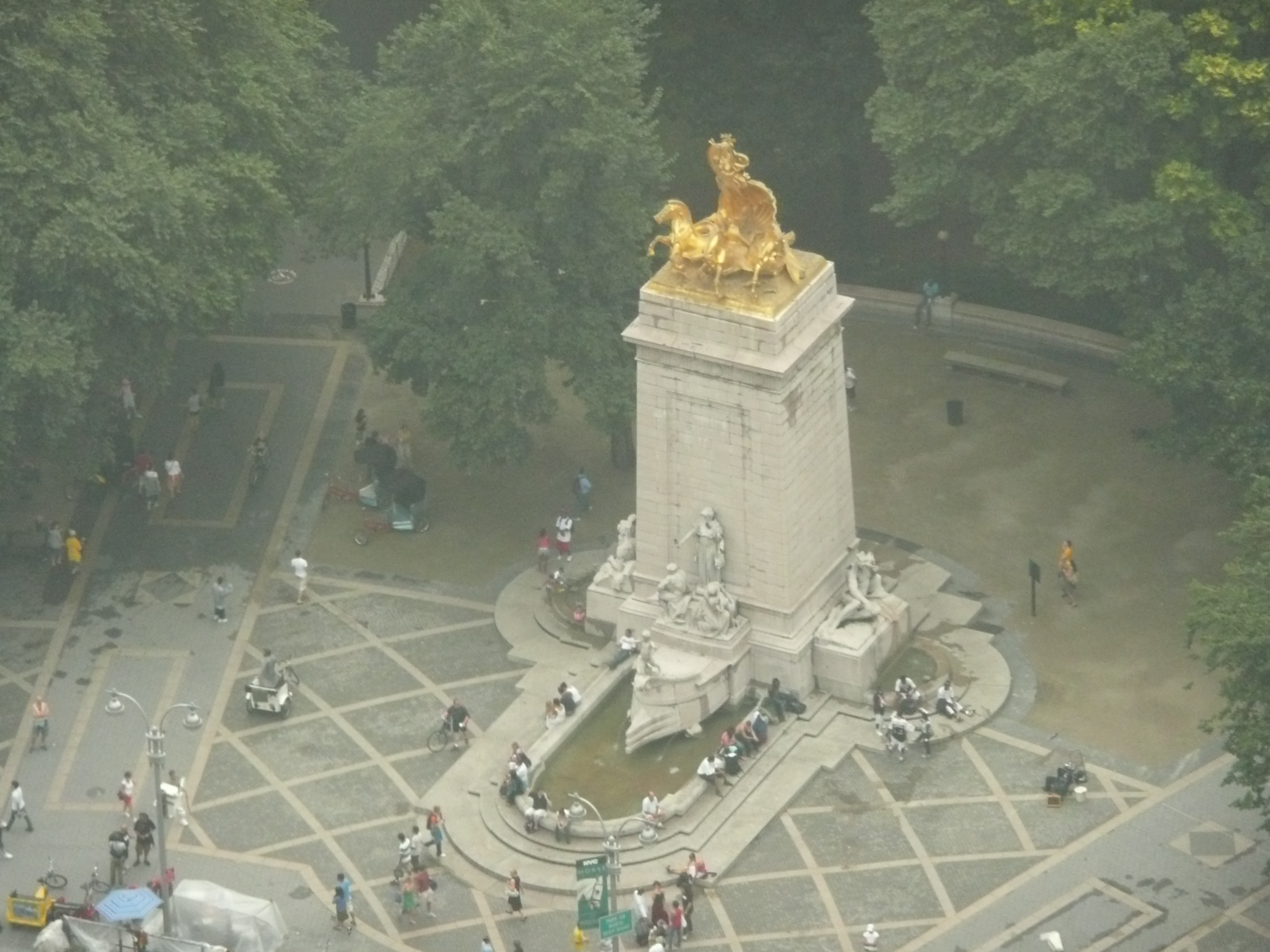
USS Maine Monument in New York City

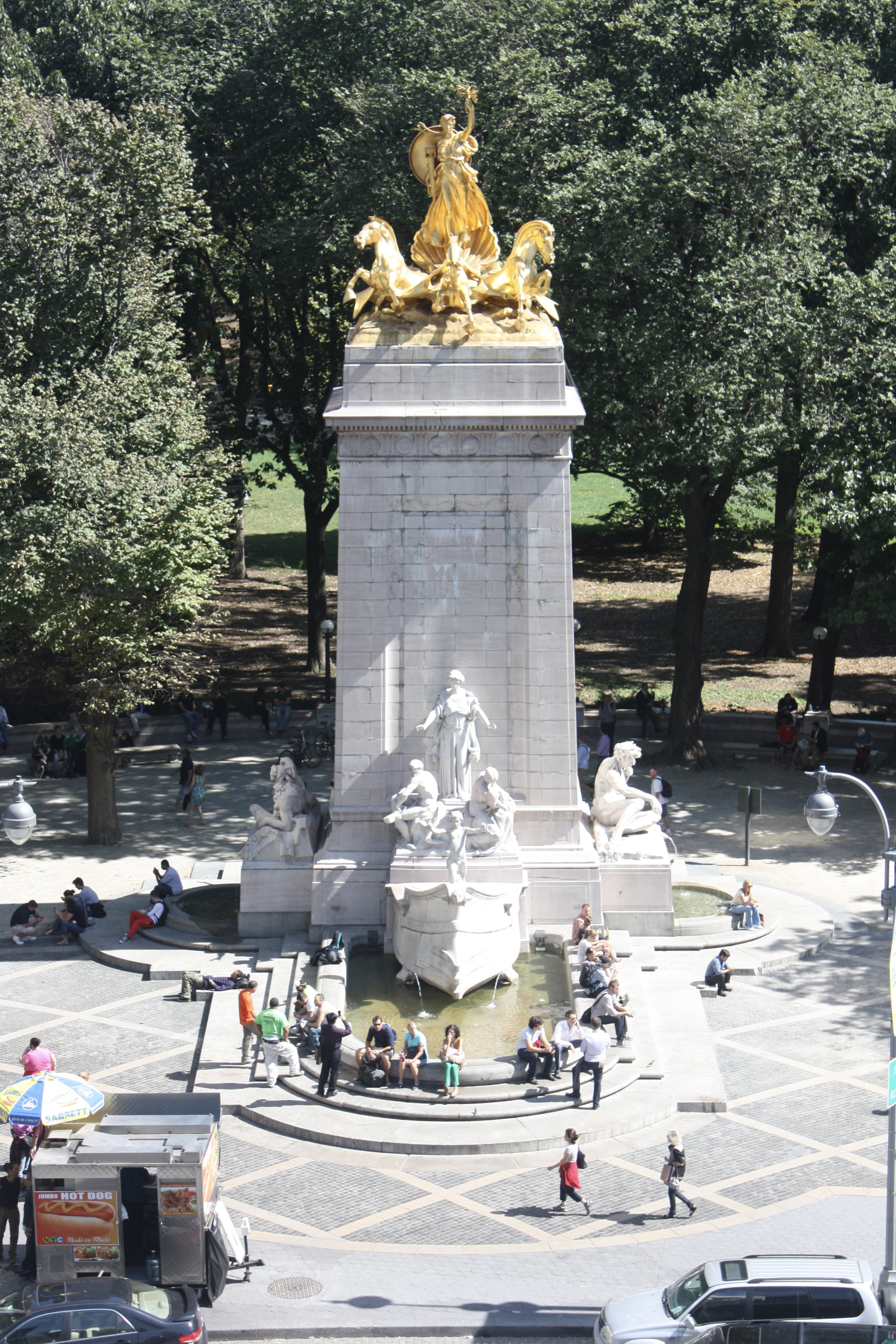
USS Maine Monument, Columbus Circle, New York City

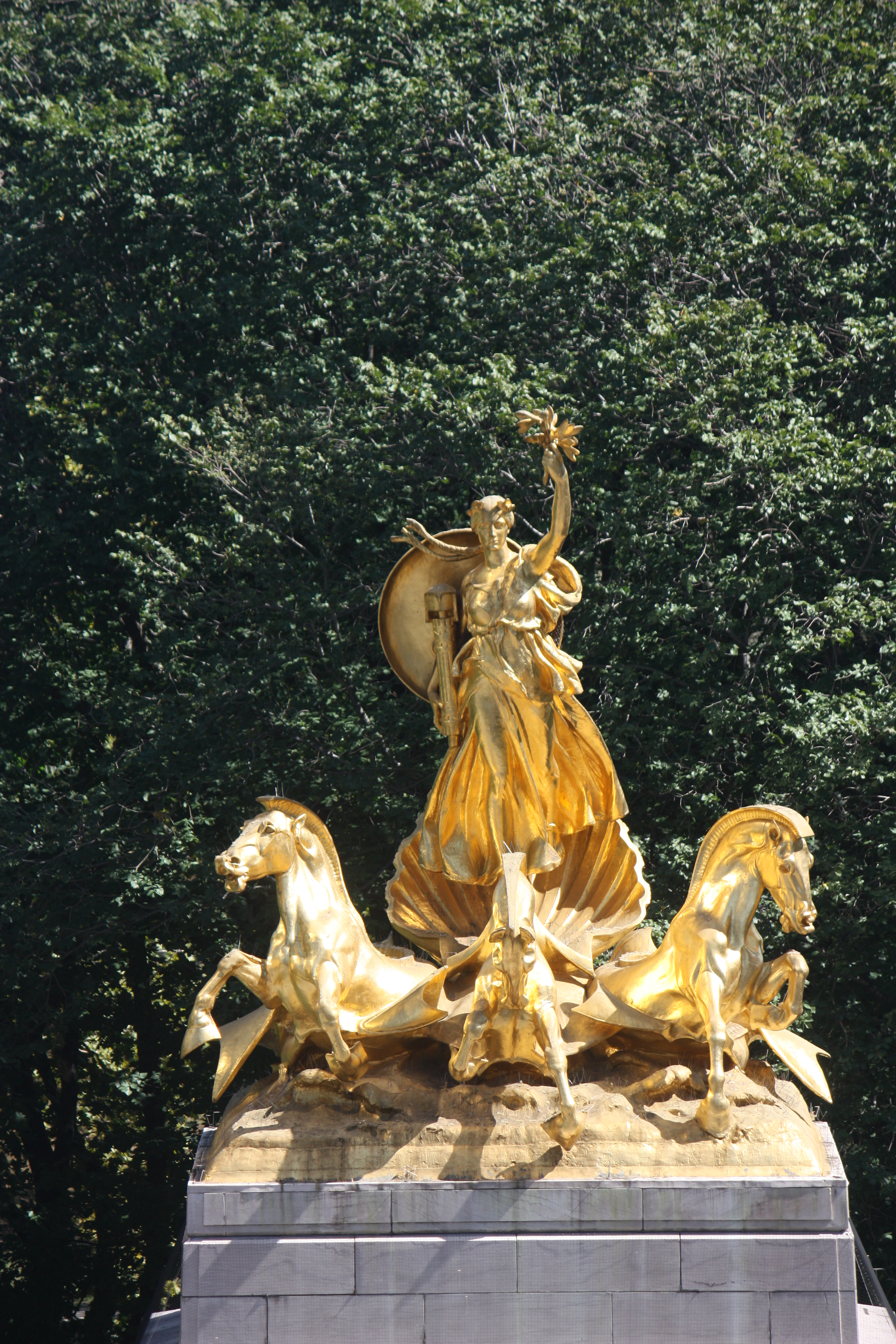
Columbia Triumphant, atop the USS Maine monument, New York City

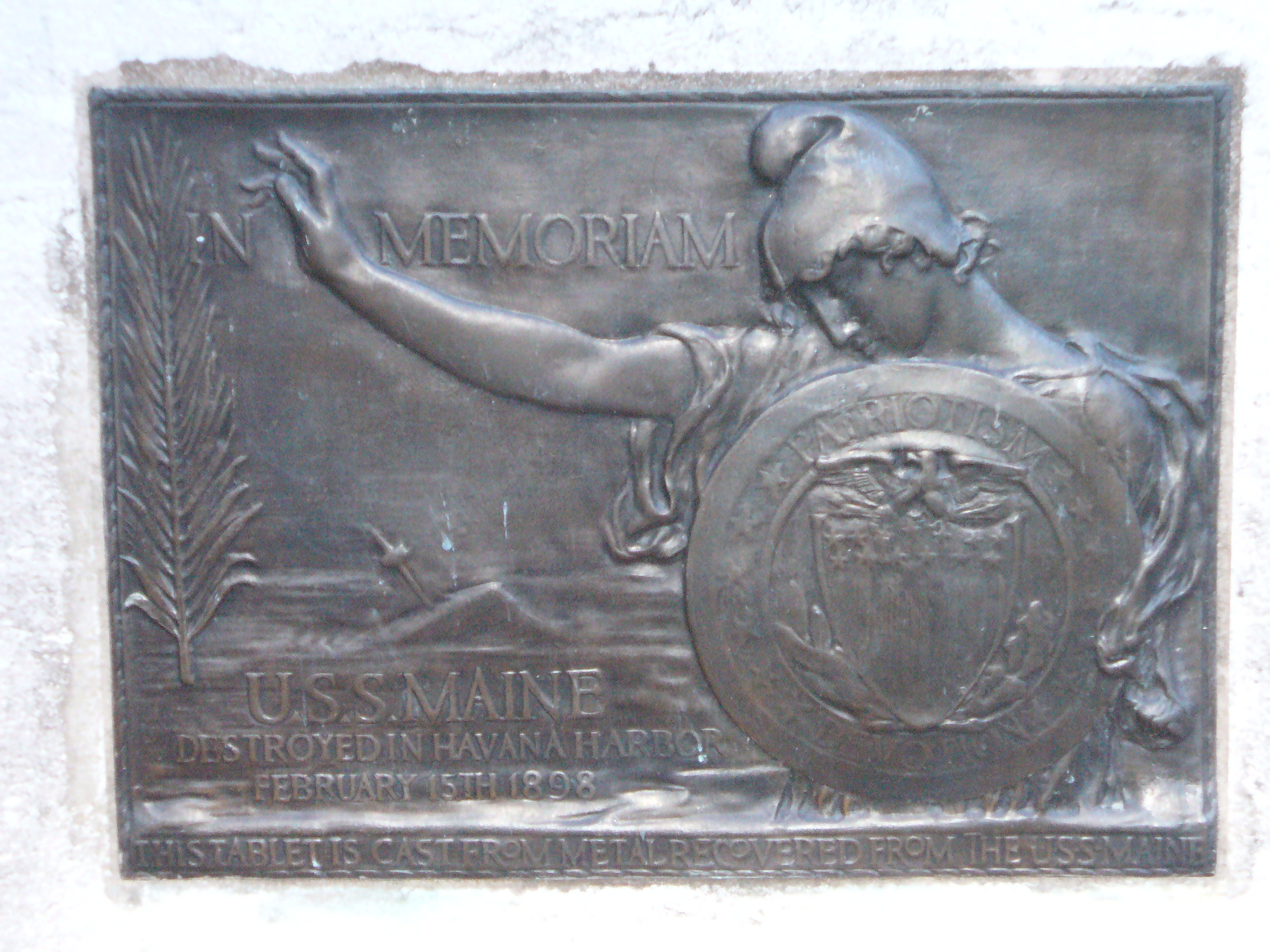
Memorial plaque by Charles Keck, USS Maine Memorial

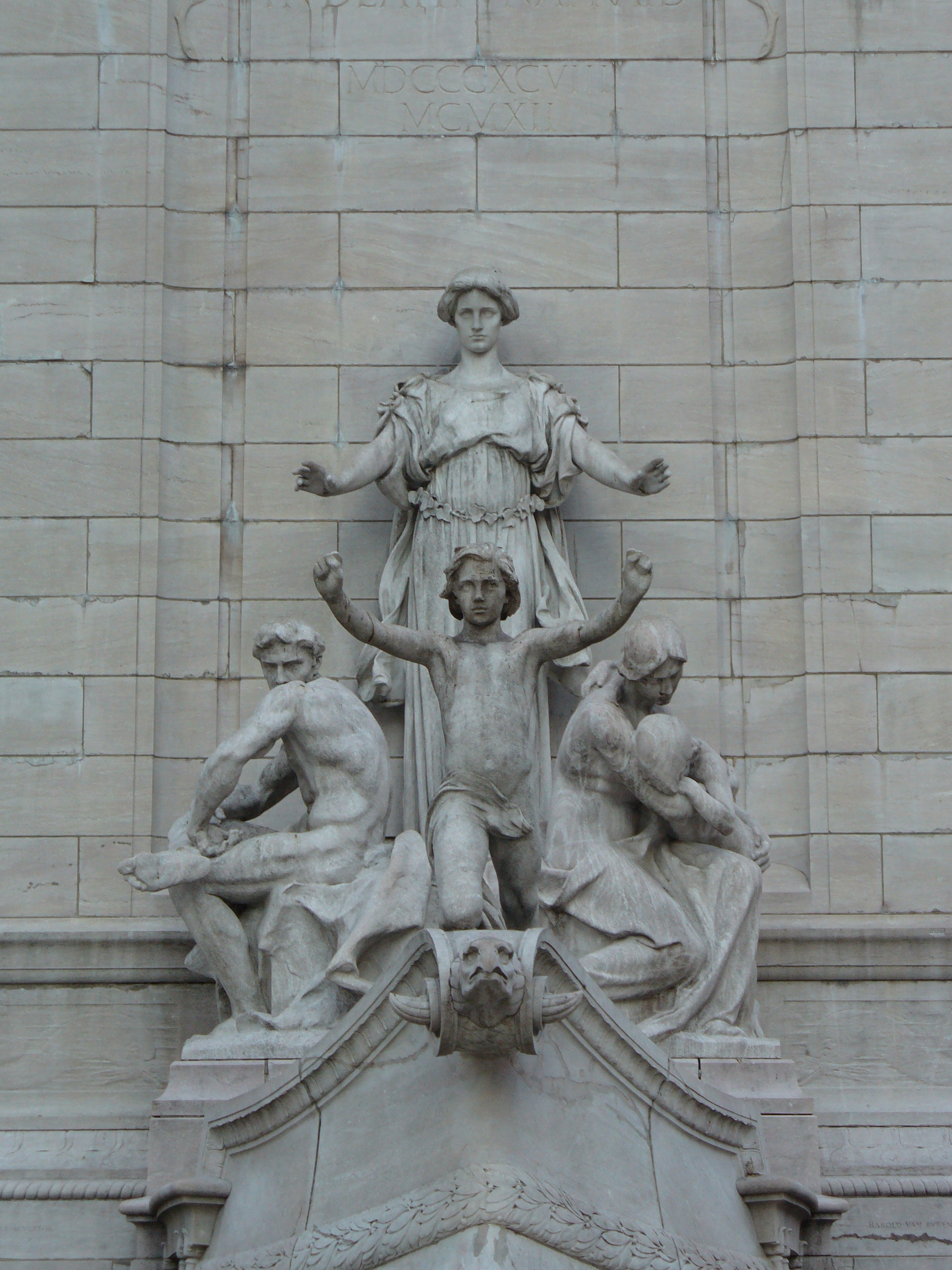
Sculpture group by Attilio Piccirilli at USS Maine Memorial

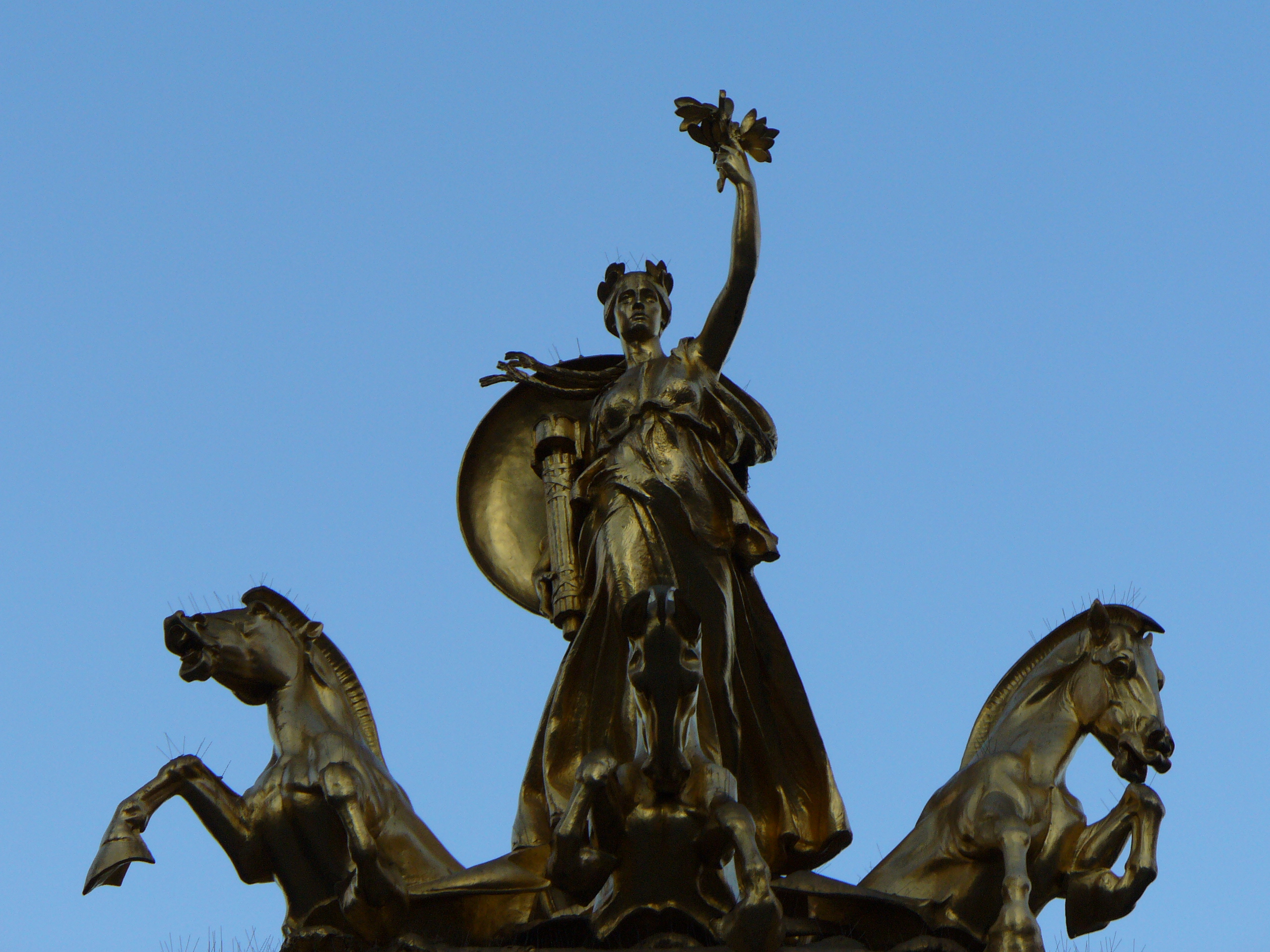
Columbia Triumphant sculpture group atop USS Maine Memorial

=== Other memorials ===
- In 1898, Georges Méliès made his movie, Divers at Work on the Wreck of the "Maine", about rescuers freeing bodies from the sunken Maine.
- On 25 March 1912, a cowl from USS Maine arrived in Woburn, Massachusetts and is still on display in Woburn Center.
- In 1912, a porthole cover and a section of the base mast was given to the City of Newburgh Heights, Ohio. The relics were mounted on a large rock in the city's Washington Park in 1948.
- In 1914, one of Maine's six anchors was taken from the Washington Navy Yard to City Park in Reading, Pennsylvania, and dedicated during a ceremony presided over by Franklin D. Roosevelt, who was then assistant secretary of the navy.
- A brass torpedo tube hatch recovered from Maine is on display at Lakeside Park in Oakland, California. It was stolen from its mount in the park in May 2011, but quickly recovered by authorities after the thieves attempted to sell it for scrap metal. The large piece was relocated and mounted by OPW Facility Services in front of Oakland's Veterans building on Grand Ave.
- A memorial including the shield and scrollwork from the bow of the ship is located in Bangor, Maine.
- A 6-inch gun from Maine is in Washington, D.C., at the National Museum of the United States Navy.
- A 6-inch gun from Maine is in Fort Allen Park in Portland, Maine.
- A 6-inch gun from Maine is displayed on the front lawn of city hall in Alpena, Michigan, as well as a bronze plaque made from the vessel.
- The base of Maine's conning tower is currently on display at Westbrook Veterans' Memorial Park in Canton, Ohio, hometown of President McKinley.
- Shells from the main battery were placed along with small plaques as memorials at the Soldier's Home in Marion, Indiana (now a VA hospital and national cemetery), at the St. Joseph County Courthouse lawn in South Bend, Indiana, and at Point Defiance Park in Tacoma, Washington. A shell from the main battery is located in Veterans Park in Lewiston, Maine.
- A monument for Maine with a portion of a bronze engine room ventilator shaft is located in Pompton Lakes, New Jersey.
- The capstan of the ship was secured for Charleston, South Carolina, where it was displayed on the Battery until 2006; it is currently awaiting reinstallation.
- A shell from the Maine is on display at the Hoboken Public Library in Hoboken, New Jersey.
- There is a plaque dedicated to Maine at the war memorial in Stephen R. Gregg Park in Bayonne, New Jersey. The plaque is made from metal salvaged from the ship.CITEREFCoughlin
- A 6-pound deck gun from Maine is on the north lawn of the South Carolina State House in Columbia, South Carolina.
- A 6-pound deck gun from Maine is at the White Plains Public Works Yard in White Plains, New York, after being removed from Battle Whitney Park.
- A bronze torpedo tube and armored hatch form part of a memorial in West Park, Pittsburgh, Pennsylvania, just south of West North Avenue.
- There is also a USS Maine Memorial plaque (visible in photographs and physically in situ) at the south door of the Jefferson County Courthouse, in Steubenville, Ohio.
- The Maine State Museum in Augusta has a porthole on display, recovered in 1910. It has other artifacts which are not on display.
- There is a porthole cover from USS Maine located in Woodlawn Cemetery, Wadsworth, Ohio, as part of a Spanish War Memorial. It was erected by Wadsworth Camp 24 U.S.W.V.

== See also ==
- List of battleships of the United States Navy
- U.S. Navy memorials
- Monument to the Victims of the USS Maine (Havana)
- Wat Tyler Cluverius Jr. – last surviving officer of the sinking (died 1952)
