= William P. Potter =

American naval officer (1850–1917)

William Parker Potter
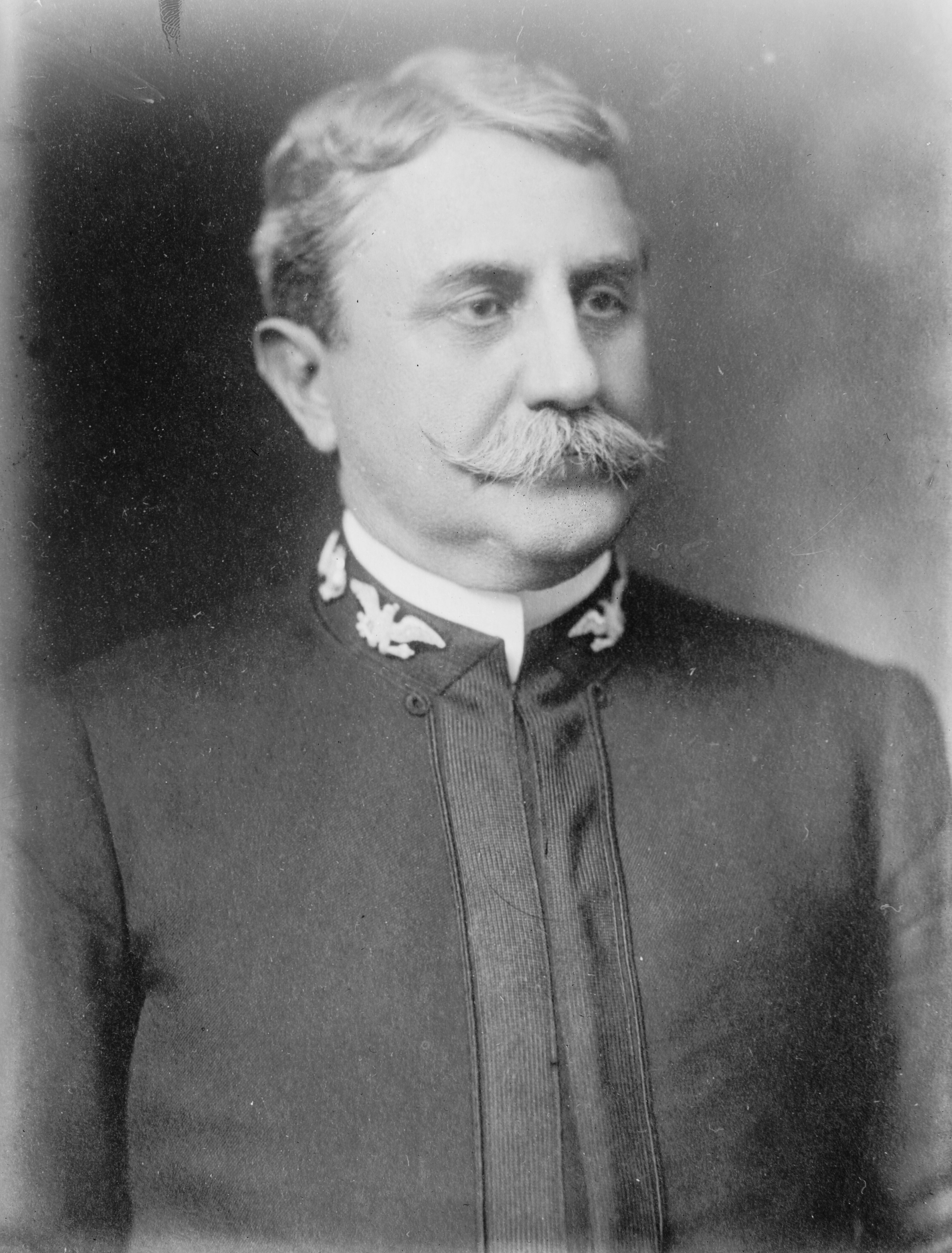
- Born: May 10, 1850; Whitehall, New York, US
- Died: June 21, 1917 (aged 67); Whitehall, New York, US
- Burial place: Arlington National Cemetery
- Military career
- Allegiance: United States
- Branch: United States Navy
- Service years: 1869–1912
- Rank: Rear admiral
- Commands: Bureau of Navigation; USS Vermont
- Conflicts: Spanish–American War
- Awards: Sampson Medal

William Parker Potter (May 10, 1850 – June 21, 1917) was a rear admiral in the United States Navy. He served as chief of the Bureau of Navigation from July to December 1909. Potter previously commanded battleship USS Vermont and then Fourth Division, Atlantic Fleet during the voyage of Great White Fleet.

== Early career ==
William P. Potter was born on May 10, 1850, in Whitehall, New York, the son of Joseph and Catharine Potter. He entered the United States Naval Academy at Annapolis, Maryland, as cadet-midshipman on September 26, 1865, and graduated on June 4, 1869. He was subsequently attached to the frigate USS Sabine which conducted midshipman training cruises to European and Mediterranean ports.

Potter was promoted to ensign on July 12, 1870, and transferred to the frigate USS Franklin, the Flagship of Rear Admiral Charles S. Boggs, commander of the European Squadron. While aboard Franklin, he was promoted to the rank of master (equivalent to the present rank of lieutenant (junior grade) on July 12, 1871, and was transferred to the steamer USS Hartford, which was a part of Asiatic Squadron at the time.

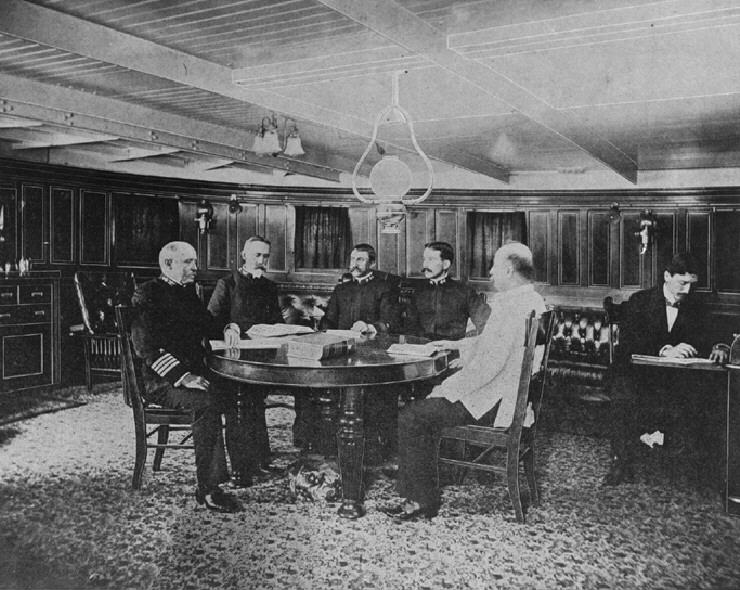
Photograph from the 12 April 1898 edition of Uncle Sam's Navy of the Sampson Board's court of inquiry meeting aboard the lighthouse tender USLHT Mangrove in Havana Harbor, ca. March 1898. From left are Captain French Ensor Chadwick, Captain William T. Sampson, Potter, Ensign W. V. Powelson, and Lieutenant Commander Adolph Marix.

Upon promotion to full lieutenant on August 9, 1874, Potter was transferred to the staff of the United States Naval Academy at Annapolis, Maryland, and joined the Department of English Studies, History, and Law under Professor James R. Soley, future Assistant Secretary of the Navy as an assistant instructor.

After four years at Annapolis, Potter was ordered to the steam frigate USS Powhatan in January 1879, which served as the flagship of Rear Admiral Robert H. Wyman, commander of North Atlantic Station. Admiral Wyman later switched his flag to USS Tennessee and Potter served aboard her until September 1881, when he returned to the United States Naval Academy.

Potter then served as an instructor in the Department of Ordnance and Gunnery and remained in this capacity until early 1882, when he joined the USS Dale, which served as the training ship for cadet-midshipmen at Annapolis. In July 1882, he was appointed assistant to the commandant of midshipmen, Commander Norman von Heldreich Farquhar and was co-responsible for the cadets at the Naval Academy until June 1884.

He was subsequently ordered to the USS Lancaster, which served as the part of South Atlantic Squadron during the protection of American commerce interests in the South Atlantic. Potter returned to the Naval Academy at Annapolis in September 1887 and served again as assistant to the commandant of midshipmen, Henry Glass until June 1891.

Potter was subsequently appointed flag lieutenant to Rear Admiral Bancroft Gherardi, commander of North Atlantic Station, and served aboard his flagship USS Philadelphia until January 1895, when he began his fourth tour of duty at the Naval Academy as assistant to the superintendent and secretary of the academic board at the Naval Academy under Captain Philip H. Cooper. He later served as a head of the department of English and was promoted to lieutenant commander on June 12, 1896. He waited over twenty years for this promotion.

In September 1897, Potter was appointed an executive officer to Captain French Chadwick aboard armored cruiser USS New York, the flagship of Rear Admiral Montgomery Sicard, commander North Atlantic Station. Following the sinking of battleship USS Maine in Havana Harbor in February 1898, he was assigned to the Sampson Board's Court of Inquiry, investigating the incident under then-Captain William T. Sampson.

The events in the Caribbean led to the outbreak of the Spanish–American War in April that year and Potter served with the armored cruiser USS New York during that conflict and took part in the final phase of the Battle of Santiago de Cuba in July 1898. He was decorated with Sampson Medal for his participation in naval battles in Cuba.

Potter was promoted to commander on September 9, 1899, and ordered to Philadelphia Navy Yard, where he assumed duty as ordnance officer under Captain Charles E. Clark. He was transferred to the command of gunboat USS Ranger in November 1901 and commanded this vessel during the protection of American national interests in the Caribbean until June 1903, when he was ordered to Washington, D.C., for special duty in the Office of Assistant Secretary of the Navy under Charles Hial Darling. While in this capacity, Potter was promoted to captain on September 13, 1904.

== Flag assignments ==
In March 1905, Potter was appointed assistant chief of staff of Bureau of Navigation under Rear Admiral George A. Converse. He served in this capacity until June 1907, when he was appointed commanding officer of the newly commissioned battleship USS Vermont. He commanded the ship during the voyage around the world with the Great White Fleet and cruised south to the Caribbean and then to South America, making stops in Port of Spain, Rio de Janeiro, Punta Arenas, and Valparaíso, among other cities. After arriving in Mexico in March 1908, the fleet spent three weeks conducting gunnery practice. The fleet then resumed its voyage up the Pacific coast of the America, stopping in San Francisco and Seattle before crossing the Pacific to Australia, stopping in Hawaii on the way. Stops in the South Pacific included Melbourne, Sydney, and Auckland.

While with the Great White Fleet in the Philippines, Potter was promoted to the rank of rear admiral on October 30, 1908, and assumed command of Second Division, Atlantic Fleet. He later assumed command of the Fourth Division, Atlantic Fleet, and led it as the part of Great White Fleet and visited Colombo, Ceylon; Suez, Egypt; Gibraltar and returned to Hampton Roads, Virginia, in February 1909.

In July 1909, Potter was ordered to Washington, D.C., and assumed duty as chief of the Bureau of Navigation. While in this assignment, his principal responsibility was personnel management and also held additional duty as a member of the Army and Navy Joint Board.

Potter remained in that capacity until December that year, when he was appointed aide for personnel for Secretary of the Navy George von Lengerke Meyer. Secretary Meyer reorganizaed the Navy Department and Potter, who was considered one of the ablest of the nation's naval command era, helped him with that task.

Potter remained in that capacity until the beginning of January 1912, when he was injured by a fall while on his way to the President William H. Taft's reception on New Year's Day. He was granted leave of absence of four months, which would carry him up to the date of his mandatory age retirement in May that year. Potter retired on May 10, 1912, after 42 years of active service.

Potter died of apoplexy on June 21, 1917, aged 67, at his home in Whitehall, New York. He was buried with full military honors at Arlington National Cemetery, Virginia, together with his wife Sarah W. Carter. They had a daughter.
