= Official Records of the Union and Confederate Navies =

Official Records of the Union and Confederate Navies in the War of the Rebellion
- Country: United States
- Language: English
- Genre: Reference works, history
- Publisher: Government Printing Office
- Media type: Print (Hardback)
- No. of books: 30 volumes
- OCLC: 5194016

The Official Records of the Union and Confederate Navies in the War of the Rebellion, commonly known as the Official Records of the Union and Confederate Navies or Official Records (OR or ORs), is the most extensive collection of American Civil War naval records available to the general public. It includes selected first-hand accounts, orders, reports, maps, diagrams, and correspondence drawn from official records of both Union and Confederate navies.

== History ==
=== Origins ===
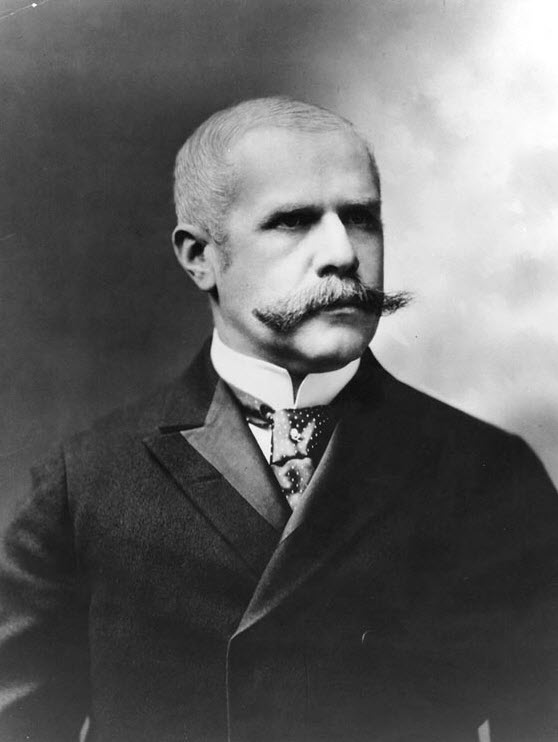
Professor James Russell Soley

The work of preparing for publication of the Official Records of the Union and Confederate Navies in the War of the Rebellion, which was begun 7 July 1884, was organized under the superintendency of Professor James Russell Soley, United States Navy, at that time librarian of the Navy Department, afterwards Assistant Secretary of the Navy. Compilation of the OR was begun in the Library soon after its organization, and was definitely appropriated for by act of July 7, 1884.

=== Publication ===
On July 31, 1894, the sum of US$15,000 was authorized for printing the Official Records of the Union and Confederate Navies, the first in a long series of Congressional appropriations provided annually until 1915. Five volumes were printed during 1895, 1896, 1897, and one volume followed each year thereafter until 1902. A paucity of source material of Confederate origin (confirmed by appearance in print of these first volumes) resulted in a request that an agent be appointed in the War Records Section to seek out and collect official records of both the Union and Confederate Navies from other than sources available at the Navy Department.

Seventeen additional volumes were published between the year 1902 and World War I. In 1922 as the printing of the Official Records of the Union and Confederate Navies in the War of the Rebellion (a work which had begun in 1894) neared completion, a Congressional Committee on Printing forbade further expenditures for this purpose pending a time when the publishing of such historical source material might be undertaken jointly by all concerned. Permission was granted, however, to complete the printing of a monograph then in the printer's hands but further work on many other proposed subjects was stopped for the next dozen years.

== See also ==
- Confederate Military History
- Official Records of the Union and Confederate Armies
