= John Koehler =

John Koehler is the name of:

- John P. Koehler (1880–1961), American football and basketball coach
- John T. Koehler (1904–1989), U.S. Assistant Secretary of the Navy
- Jack Koehler, briefly a White House Communications Director (11 days)
