= USS Soley =

Allen M. Sumner-class destroyer

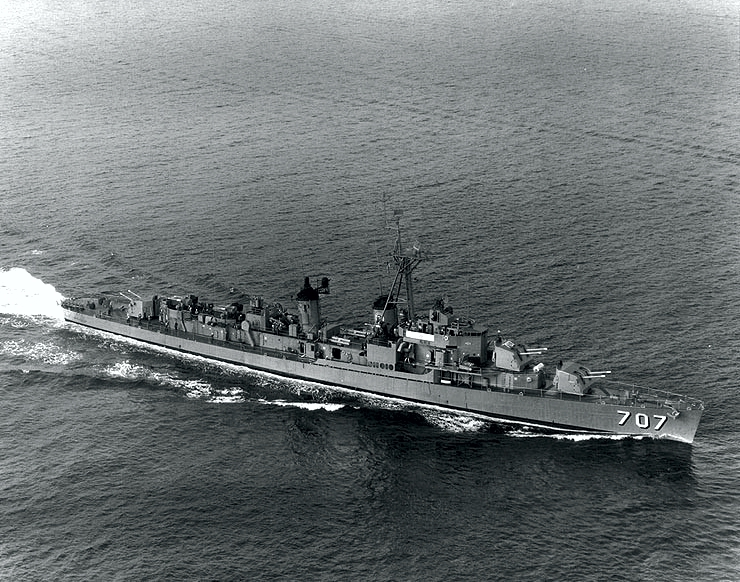
- Soley underway on 19 November 1961

History

United States
- Name: Soley
- Namesake: James R. Soley
- Builder: Federal Shipbuilding and Drydock Company
- Laid down: 18 April 1944
- Launched: 8 September 1944
- Commissioned: 7 December 1944
- Decommissioned: 13 February 1970
- Stricken: 1 July 1970
- Motto: Libertatis Servito
- Fate: Disposed of in a fleet training exercise 18 September 1970

General characteristics
- Class & type: Allen M. Sumner-class destroyer
- Displacement: 2,200 tons
- Length: 376 ft 6 in (114.76 m)
- Beam: 40 ft (12 m)
- Draft: 15 ft 8 in (4.78 m)
- Propulsion: 60,000 shp (45,000 kW); 2 propellers
- Speed: 34 knots (63 km/h; 39 mph)
- Range: 6,500 nmi (12,000 km; 7,500 mi) at 15 kn (28 km/h; 17 mph)
- Complement: 336
- Armament: 6 × 5 in (130 mm)/38 cal. guns, 12 × 40 mm AA guns, 11 × 20 mm AA guns, 10 × 21 inch (533 mm) torpedo tubes, 6 × depth charge projectors, 2 × depth charge tracks

USS Soley (DD-707), an Allen M. Sumner-class destroyer, was named for James R. Soley, who became Assistant Secretary of the Navy in 1899. Soley was responsible for the collection and publication of Union and Confederate Naval records. He is considered to be a naval historian.

Soley was laid down on 18 April 1944 at Kearny, New Jersey, by Federal Shipbuilding and Drydock Co. and launched on 8 September 1944; sponsored by Mrs. C. M. Cornfelt, Mrs. Howard C. Dickinson, and Mrs. Howard C. Dickinson Jr. The ship was commissioned on 7 December 1944.

== Service history ==
=== World War II ===
Soley sailed on 29 December 1944 for a shakedown cruise in Bermuda waters. On 1 February 1945, she headed back toward the Brooklyn Navy Yard for post-shakedown availability before joining the Atlantic Fleet at Norfolk, Virginia, on 18 February. After serving in the Virginia Capes area as a training ship, she was ordered to the west coast.

Soley arrived at San Diego on 17 August. She reached Pearl Harbor ten days later and was routed onward to the Marshall Islands, arriving at Kwajalein on 5 September. Soley joined Task Unit (TU) 96.15.1, a Military Government Unit, which sortied for Kusaie Island, on 7 September, to take part in the acceptance of the surrender of Japanese forces. The surrender articles were signed on 8 September, and Soley remained at Kusaie as station ship until mid-October.

From 14 October to 17 December, the destroyer operated directly under the Commander of the Marshall-Gilbert Islands Area. On two occasions, she was called upon to transport Japanese prisoners from outlying islands to Kwajalein for possible trial before the War Crimes Commission. The most prominent among them was Rear Admiral Shigematsu Sakaibara, the commander at Wake Island.

On 18 December, Soley departed the Marshall Islands for Japan and duty with the occupation forces, arriving at Yokosuka on 27 December 1945. In February 1946, the destroyer was ordered to return to Casco Bay, Maine, via Hawaii, Long Beach, and the Panama Canal. In December 1946, the ship sailed to Guantánamo Bay, Cuba, for training exercises and next reported to Charleston, South Carolina, for inactivation with the Atlantic Reserve Fleet. The destroyer was placed in reserve, out of commission, on 15 April 1947.

Soley was placed in commission again on 29 January 1949. After pre-shakedown training, the ship entered the Charleston Naval Shipyard for an overhaul from March through May. Following shakedown in Guantanamo Bay, Soley joined Destroyer Squadron (DesRon) 20, with its home port at Norfolk. She operated with her squadron along the east coast until 4 August 1950 when she sailed to the Mediterranean Sea for duty with the 6th Fleet. The destroyer represented the United States at the funeral of King Gustaf V of Sweden. She was in Stockholm on 9 November, with Rear Admiral Walter F. Boone, the Commander in Chief, Eastern Atlantic and Mediterranean Naval Forces, on board. She rejoined the 6th Fleet in December and, in January 1951, returned to Norfolk for an overhaul.

Yard work was completed on 15 May, and the ship proceeded to Guantanamo Bay for refresher training. Soley resumed her routine east coast operations which she continued until May 1952. On 15 May, she got underway, with three other destroyers, for Japan, via the Panama Canal and Pearl Harbor, arriving at Yokosuka on 18 June.

=== Korea ===
Soley steamed north to the Korean war zone and, from 22 June to 1 July, operated in the antisubmarine screen of Task Force (TF) 77, the fast carrier task force. During this period, the carriers conducted raids against the North Korean hydroelectric power stations on the Yalu River. Soley and the cruiser Helena were detached from the task force to go to the "bomb-line" to provide shore bombardment in support of ground troops.

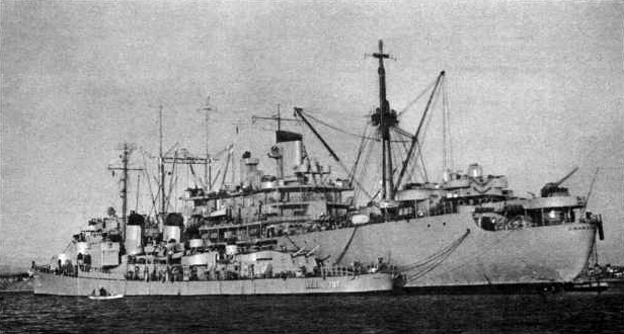
USS Soley alongside USS Grand Canyon at Augusta, Sicily on 16 December 1950.

Soley and Helena joined the battleship Iowa, and the trio conducted shore bombardment at Wonsan, Kojo, and Kosong through 9 July. From 21 July to 22 August, the destroyer operated with the United Nations Blockade and Escort Force (TF 95) in the Wonsan-Hung-nam area and north to Ch'aho. She bombarded railroad and highway bridges and tunnels. She took on board more than 60 prisoners and refugees from sampans in the bombardment area. During the first half of September, the destroyer operated with an antisubmarine hunter-killer group. She returned to TF 77 on 15 September and operated with it until proceeding to Sasebo on 9 October.

Soley then departed the Far East on 19 October for Norfolk, but not on a direct route. She returned via Malaya, Ceylon, and Arabia; proceeded through the Red Sea and the Suez Canal; and made stops at ports in Italy and France, and Gibraltar; and finally arrived at Norfolk on 12 December 1952. On 25 January 1953, Soley sailed for operations in the Caribbean. Upon her return to Norfolk, she commenced an overhaul and was there from 30 April to 21 August. Refresher training was held from 3 September to 2 November, followed by preparations for her second world cruise.

On 4 January 1954, Soley, Strong, and Barton stood out of Norfolk en route to the west coast. They transited the Panama Canal on 9 January and anchored briefly at San Diego where Stickell joined the group before continuing west. The destroyers called at Pearl Harbor and Midway before arriving at Yokosuka on 7 February. She completed a patrol off Korea, made port calls from Hong Kong to South Africa, and returned to Norfolk on 10 August 1954.

=== 1955–1970 ===
Soley operated along the east coast until being deployed to the Mediterranean from July 1956 to February 1957 and again from July to December 1957. She was participating in "Springboard 58", the annual Caribbean exercise, during January 1958 when she and Barton rescued the crew of SS St. Eleftiero which later sank. Soley was deployed to the Mediterranean from October 1958 to April 1959; While in the Eastern Mediterranean in December 1958, Soley responded to a distress message reporting a fire on board the Panamanian tanker Mirador in Iskenderun Bay, Turkey. One sailor was lost fighting the fire aboard the ship.

After proceeding to Beirut on 12 January, Soley was called upon to respond to another fire in Mirador. During this deployment, port calls were made in Gibraltar, Golf Juan, Malta, Cartagena, Athens, Beirut, Genoa, San Remo, Marseille, Barcelona, and Rota. A royal welcome awaited Destroyer Squadron 2 when they returned to Norfolk on 9 April, with Commander Destroyer Flotilla 4 embarked. The remainder of April and early May 1959 were spent alongside the piers in Norfolk.

On 8 May Soley began a two-week operation with Essex and Saratoga off the Florida Coast returning to Norfolk in mid-May. Soley then participated in INTEX exercises in the South Atlantic with a visit to Mayport, Florida for the Memorial Day weekend. The ship returned to the Norfolk area in early June to participate in TRAMIDLEX, an amphibious exercise involving midshipmen. During this period Soley was involved in a collision with a whale which severely damaged her sonar dome, requiring replacement at the Norfolk Naval Shipyard beginning on 1 July.

On 15 August CDR Richard Flournoy Jr. assumed duties as Commanding Officer of Soley. On 11 September Commander Destroyer Flotilla FOUR presented Soley with the Battle Efficiency "E" for 1959. This was the second consecutive year that Soley received this award. At the same time the ship received the DESLANT Operations Department "E" and the Communications "C" for excellence.

The remainder of 1959 was devoted to Hunter-Killer ASW operations along the Atlantic Coast until December when the ship returned to Norfolk for the holiday period.

Soley was again deployed from September 1961 to March 1962; and from 29 March to 4 September 1963. In 1962, during the Cuban Missile Crisis, she served with the quarantine forces off Cuba from October to December.

On 1 March 1964, Soley's home port was changed from Norfolk, Virginia, to Charleston, South Carolina; and, on 1 April, she was assigned duty as a United States Naval Reserve training ship. She served in this capacity until being decommissioned on 13 February 1970. Soley was struck from the Navy list on 1 July 1970 and sunk on 18 September 1970 as a training target in the Atlantic Ocean north of Puerto Rico at 19°30′N 065°38′W in waters approximately 3,800 fathoms (22,800 feet; 6,900 meters) deep.

== Honors and awards ==
Soley received one battle star for service in the Korean War.
