= Clayton Marks =

American historian

Clayton Marks was an American educator, soldier, banker and historian. Marks was born on July 1, 1894, in Aurora, Illinois, and died on March 4, 1957, in Chicago, Illinois. Marks attended Yale University from 1911 to 1915 then served as an officer in the United States Marine Corps during World War I, receiving the Silver Star and two Purple Hearts. After the war, in 1923, he earned his PhD at the University of Chicago in History, writing his dissertation on the Spanish–American War.

After completing his PhD, Marks accepted a position at the George Washington University, where he taught military history, and became known as a leading scholar of the American military. Marks also befriended Secretary of the Navy Curtis Wilbur, with whom he frequently discussed naval affairs. Marks informally advised Wilbur from 1924 until 1927. Then, in mid-1927, he left teaching and was appointed Chief of Legislative Affairs of the Department of the Navy, a post he held until 1929, when a new administration came to power.

After leaving the Department of the Navy, Marks returned to his native Illinois and accepted a position in the Department of History at the University of Chicago, where he taught military history until 1932. Although he acquired a distinguished reputation among both students and colleagues as a lecturer, he published little and had a weak reputation as a researcher. As a result, he was not offered tenure and elected to leave the university for the world of business.

In 1933, Marks joined the National Builders Bank of Chicago as an executive, helping the bank navigate through the Great Depression. Throughout the thirties, he also became active in the Chicago Public Schools, informally advising the Board of Education and top officials, and helping to design the history curriculum of the schools. In 1940, Marks was instrumental in changing the name of National Builders Banks of Chicago to LaSalle National Bank.

In 1941, with the American entry into World War II, Marks hoped to again serve the Marine Corps, though not on active duty due to his age. Early in 1942, he returned to Washington, where he worked in the Office of the Secretary of the Navy, helping to organize officer training programs for the Navy and Marine Corps. As the war progressed, Marks was selected, due to his background as a military historian, to help write official histories of many Marine Corps victories in the Pacific. In June 1944, Ralph Bard, a Chicago banker like Marks, became Undersecretary of the Navy. The two men, though not close, had been acquainted in the pre-war years, and Bard made Marks his principal deputy with broad responsibilities.

At the end of the war, Marks left Washington and the military once and for all, returning to Chicago. In Chicago, Marks decided not to return the world of business and became a strong advocate of public education, advancing the case that good education was the key to America's future success. In 1948, mayor Martin Kennelly appointed Marks to the Chicago Board of Education, and in 1951, he was appointed Vice President of the Board, a position he held until 1954 when he retired due to health problems. During the same period, Marks served on the board of the LaSalle National Bank and lectured at DePaul University.

After his retirement, Marks, whose health was failing, spent much of his time writing letters to his remaining contacts in Washington to advocate for educational benefits for veterans of World War II and the Korean War and expansion or extension of the G.I. Bill. He died in his home on March 4, 1957, at the age of 63 after suffering a heart attack.
