= George Converse =

George Converse may refer to:

- George L. Converse (1827–1897), U.S. Representative from Ohio
- George A. Converse (1844–1909), U.S. Navy, naval engineer
