= USS Converse =

Two ships of the United States Navy have been named Converse after George Albert Converse, who was noted for his contributions to naval engineering.

- USS Converse (DD-291), a Clemson-class destroyer commissioned in 1920 and decommissioned in 1930.
- USS Converse (DD-509), a Fletcher-class destroyer commissioned in 1942 and decommissioned in 1946; later transferred to Spain as Almirante Valdés (D23); scrapped, 1988
