= How to Save a Marriage and Ruin Your Life =

1968 film by Fielder Cook

- Theatrical release poster
- Directed by: Fielder Cook
- Written by: Stanley Shapiro; Nate Monaster
- Produced by: Stanley Shapiro
- Starring: Dean Martin; Stella Stevens; Eli Wallach; Anne Jackson; Betty Field; Jack Albertson
- Cinematography: Lee Garmes
- Edited by: Philip W. Anderson
- Music by: Michel Legrand
- Production company: Nob Hill Productions Inc.
- Distributed by: Columbia Pictures
- Release date: January 29, 1968
- Running time: 102 minutes
- Country: United States
- Language: English
- Box office: $2.5 million (US and Canada rentals)

How to Save a Marriage and Ruin Your Life is a 1968 American romantic comedy film directed by Fielder Cook. It stars Dean Martin, Stella Stevens and husband and wife Eli Wallach and Anne Jackson.

== Plot ==
David Sloane is a confirmed bachelor whose married pal Harry Hunter is having an affair. David decides to do something about it so Harry doesn't mess up his home life.

The scheme is to make a play for Harry's mistress himself. David meets and courts Harry's attractive employee, Carol Corman, determined to break up her fling with Harry once and for all. David's plan goes wrong because he has the wrong woman. Harry's actual mistress is Carol's next-door neighbor, Muriel Laszlo. As soon as he learns (mistakenly) that she is seeing another man, Harry decides to give his marriage to Mary one more try.

Carol and Muriel come to realize what happened. They decide to team up, giving David and Harry a taste of their own medicine.

== Cast ==
- Dean Martin as David Sloane
- Stella Stevens as Carol Corman
- Eli Wallach as Harry Hunter
- Anne Jackson as Muriel Laszlo
- Betty Field as Thelma
- Jack Albertson as Mr. Slotkin
- Katharine Bard as Mary Hunter
- Woodrow Parfrey as Eddie Rankin
- Alan Oppenheimer as Everett Bauer
- Shelley Morrison as Marcia Borie
- George Furth as Roger

== Reception ==
Roger Ebert said that it was made with "great goodwill", but also deemed it old-fashioned compared to then-recent films like The Graduate.
