= Frank W. Hackett =

American lawyer

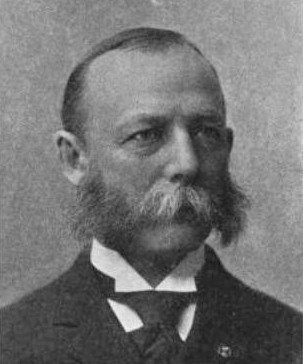

7th Assistant Secretary of the Navy
- In office April 24, 1900 – December 16, 1901
- President: William McKinley Theodore Roosevelt
- Preceded by: Charles Herbert Allen
- Succeeded by: Charles Hial Darling

Personal details
- Born: Frank Warren Hackett; April 11, 1841 Portsmouth, New Hampshire
- Died: August 10, 1926 (aged 85) Portsmouth, New Hampshire
- Resting place: Arlington National Cemetery
- Education: Harvard University
- Occupation: Lawyer, civilian administrator

Frank Warren Hackett (April 11, 1841 – August 10, 1926) was a civilian administrator and lawyer who served as an Assistant Secretary of the Navy under Presidents William McKinley and Theodore Roosevelt.

== Biography ==
Frank W. Hackett was born in Portsmouth, New Hampshire on April 11, 1841. He attended Harvard University, earning a bachelor's degree in 1861, and a Master of Arts in 1864.

During the American Civil War, he was an assistant paymaster serving the Atlantic Fleet. Hackett was on board USS Miami during its skirmish against CSS Albemarle. After the war, he passed the bar exam and eventually opened a law office in Washington, D.C. From April 1900 to December 1901, Hackett served as Assistant Secretary of the Navy.

He died at the naval hospital in Portsmouth, New Hampshire on August 10, 1926, and was buried at Arlington National Cemetery.

Government offices
Preceded by Charles Herbert Allen	Assistant Secretary of the Navy; April 24, 1900 – December 16, 1901	Succeeded by Charles Hial Darling
