= Gordon Woodbury =

American Assistant Secretary of the Navy

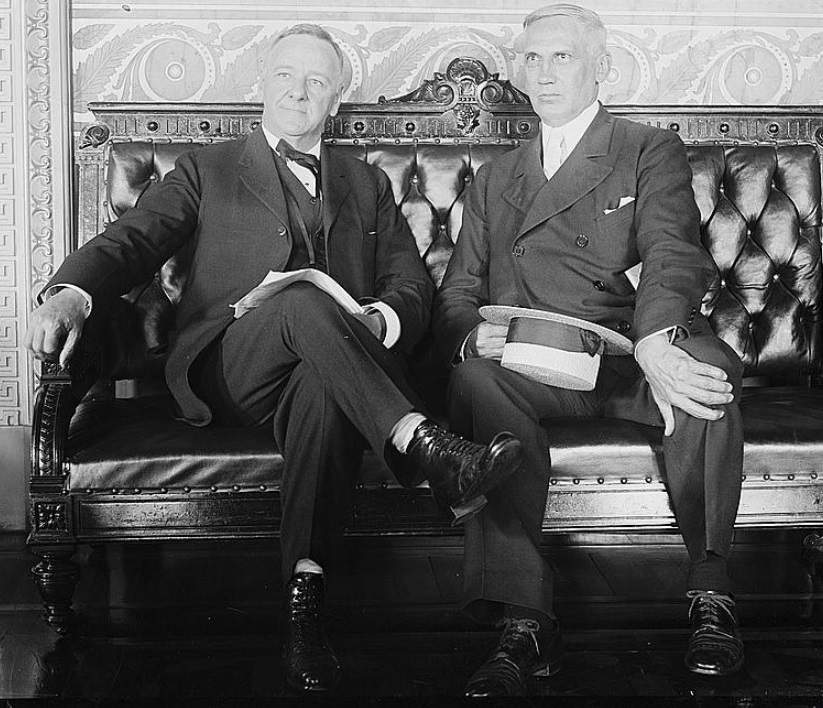
- Woodbury (right) meeting with Secretary of the Navy Josephus Daniels, 1920

13th Assistant Secretary of the Navy
- In office August 26, 1920 – March 10, 1921
- President: Woodrow Wilson; Warren G. Harding
- Preceded by: Franklin D. Roosevelt
- Succeeded by: Theodore Roosevelt Jr.

Personal details
- Born: September 17, 1863 New York City, U.S.
- Died: June 17, 1924 (aged 60) Manchester, New Hampshire
- Party: Democratic

Gordon Woodbury (1863–1924) was the United States Assistant Secretary of the Navy from 1920 to 1921.

== Biography ==
Woodbury was born in New York City on September 17, 1863, and raised in Bedford, New Hampshire. He was educated at Harvard University and then returned to New Hampshire to pursue a career in politics. At one point, he was editor of the Manchester Union, the leading Democratic paper in New Hampshire. He was repeatedly elected to the New Hampshire General Court, but failed in his 1916 bid to become the member of the United States House of Representatives for New Hampshire's 1st congressional district, losing to Republican Cyrus A. Sulloway.

In 1920, Franklin D. Roosevelt resigned as Assistant Secretary of the Navy in order to run for Vice President in the 1920 presidential election. President of the United States Woodrow Wilson named Woodbury as Roosevelt's successor and he subsequently served as Assistant Secretary of the Navy from August 27, 1920, until March 9, 1921.

Woodbury remained in Washington, D. C. after stepping down as Assistant Secretary of the Navy, living at the Wardman Park Hotel.

In 1922, Woodbury planned to sail to the Mediterranean and the South Seas in his yacht, the Half Moon, but was caught in a hurricane and swept into the ocean, although all but one person survived.

Woodbury died in Manchester, New Hampshire on June 17, 1924.

Government offices
Preceded by Franklin D. Roosevelt	Assistant Secretary of the Navy; August 27, 1920 – March 9, 1921	Succeeded by Theodore Roosevelt Jr.
