= USS Converse (DD-509) =

Fletcher-class destroyer

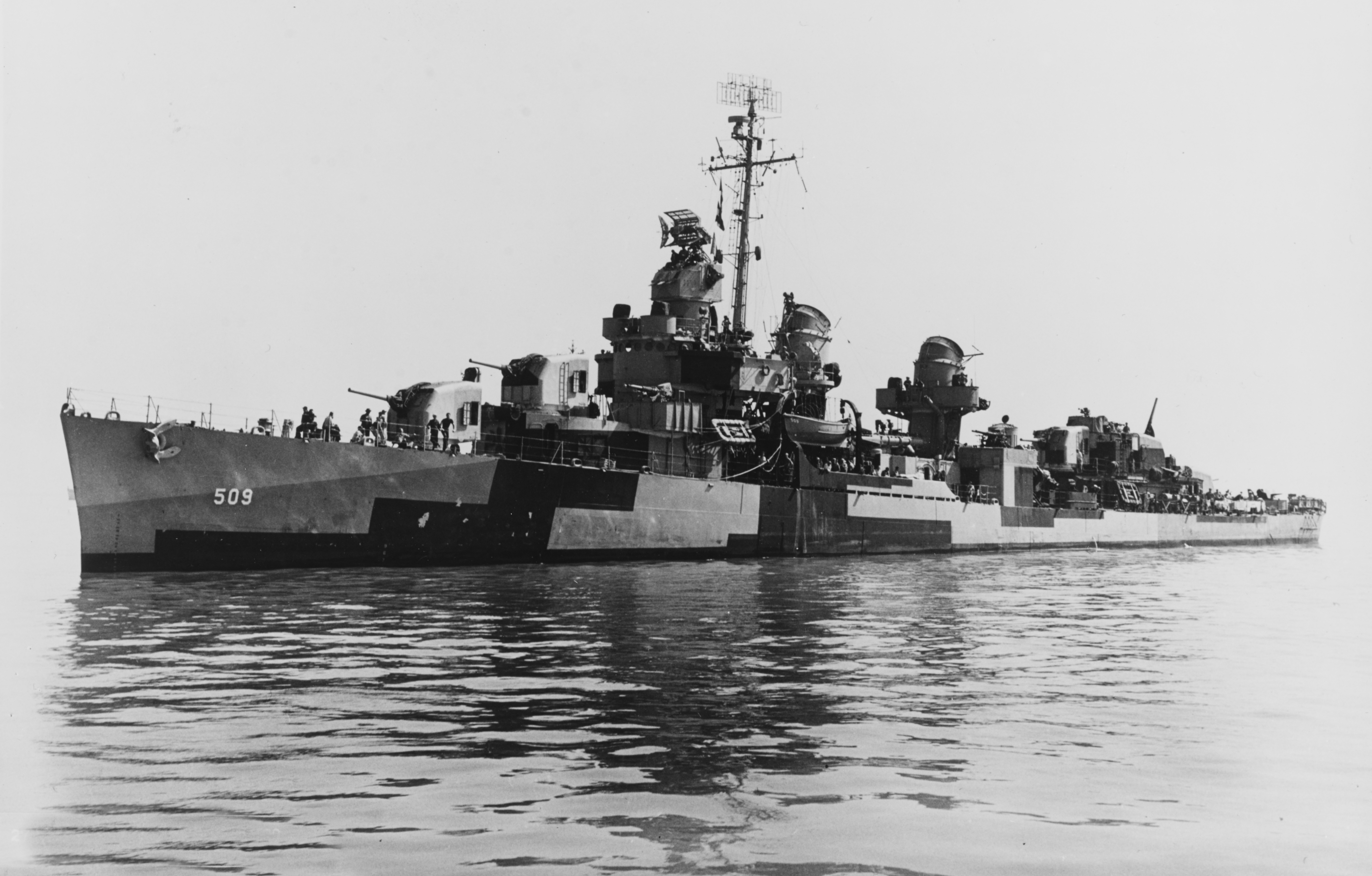
- USS Converse (DD-509) in San Francisco Bay, 9 October 1944.

History

United States
- Namesake: George A. Converse
- Builder: Bath Iron Works
- Laid down: 23 February 1942
- Launched: 30 August 1942
- Commissioned: 20 November 1942
- Decommissioned: 23 April 1946
- Stricken: 1 October 1972
- Fate: Transferred to Spain, 1 July 1959

Spain
- Name: Almirante Valdés (D23)
- Acquired: 1 July 1959
- Stricken: 17 November 1986
- Fate: Scrapped in 1988

General characteristics
- Class & type: Fletcher-class destroyer; Lepanto-class destroyer
- Displacement: 2,050 long tons (2,083 t)
- Length: 376 ft 6 in (114.7 m)
- Beam: 39 ft 8 in (12.1 m)
- Draft: 17 ft 9 in (5.4 m)
- Propulsion: 60,000 shp (45 MW); 2 propellers
- Speed: 35 knots (65 km/h; 40 mph)
- Range: 6500 nmi (12,000 km) at 15 kt
- Complement: 336
- Armament: 5 × single Mk 12 5 in (127 mm)/38 guns; 5 × twin 40 mm (1.6 in) Bofors AA guns; 7 × single 20 mm (0.8 in) Oerlikon AA guns; 2 × quintuple 21 in (533 mm) torpedo tubes; 6 × single depth charge throwers; 2 × depth charge racks

USS Converse (DD-509), a Fletcher-class destroyer, was the second ship of the United States Navy to be named for George A. Converse (1844–1909).

Converse was launched 30 August 1942 by Bath Iron Works Corp., Bath, Maine; sponsored by Miss A. V. Jackson; and commissioned 20 November 1942.

== Solomon Islands, May 1943 – March 1944 ==
After training at Guantanamo Bay and Pearl Harbor, Converse arrived at Nouméa 17 May 1943, and through the summer covered convoys carrying men and supplies to New Georgia, then escorted ships moving between Espiritu Santo and Guadalcanal. Arriving at Port Purvis in the Solomon Islands 16 September 1943, she joined Destroyer Squadron 23 (DesRon 23), with whom she was to win a Presidential Unit Citation (US) for operations in the northern Solomons between 31 October 1943 and 4 February 1944.

On the first of those dates, Converse sortied with her squadron and cruisers to provide cover for amphibious landings on Bougainville, and on the night of 31 October – 1 November 1943, bombarded Buka and Bonis airfields and targets in the Shortlands. The next night her force intercepted a Japanese group of cruisers and destroyers heading for an attack on the transports lying at Bougainville, and opened fire in the Battle of Empress Augusta Bay. The Japanese lost one cruiser and one destroyer in this action, and were turned back from their intended attack on the transports, although the American defenders came under severe attack by aircraft from Rabaul supporting the Japanese ships.

Converse continued bombardments and escort duty supporting the Bougainville operation, and on the night of 16–17 November 1943 joined Stanly in firing on a surfaced submarine, scoring several hits. On the night of 24–25 November, the squadron intercepted five Japanese destroyers attempting to evacuate critically needed aviation troops from Buka to Rabaul. In a skillfully-executed torpedo attack followed by a persistent chase, during which Converse was struck by a torpedo which failed to explode in the engine room, the squadron sank three of the enemy ships and caused heavy damage to a fourth, while emerging unscathed themselves.

While escorting a group of ships carrying reinforcements and supplies to Bougainville 3 December 1943, Converse came under heavy attack from six waves of Japanese bombers. A near miss caused an electrical failure, putting her radar out of commission and resulting in a loss of power forward. Repairs were quickly made, and the Japanese force fought off, but Converse sailed from Port Purvis 14 December for complete repairs at Sydney, Australia. She rejoined her squadron at Port Purvis 30 January 1944 for bombardments and hunting forays against Japanese shipping through February and March in the northern Solomons.

== Central Pacific, March – August 1944 ==
Converse cleared Port Purvis 27 March 1944 to join the Fast Carrier Task Force (then-TF 58) for screening duty during the air strikes on the Palaus from 30 March to 1 April, and with that force covered the Hollandia landings through preinvasion air attacks and bombardment, continuing their fire during the landings 22 April. Carrier attacks on Truk, Satawan, and Ponape at the close of the month found Converse continuing her screening duties.

Attacks preparatory to, and covering, the invasion of Saipan began 12 June as targets throughout the Marianas were hit. While the landings themselves were made on 15 June, Converse's task force hit at Japanese bases in the Bonins, then returned to the Marianas to continue their close support. When the Japanese fleet challenged the American operations in the Marianas on 19 June, Converse continued her screening through the resulting aerial Battle of the Philippine Sea, a 2-day engagement which resulted in the sinking of three Japanese carriers and the loss to Japan of many aircraft and their irreplaceable pilots. After joining in shore bombardment of Guam and Rota at the, close of June, Converse replenished at Eniwetok, and on 4 August, sailed for overhaul at Mare Island Naval Shipyard.

== Philippines and Okinawa, November 1944 – August 1945 ==
The destroyer returned to action 3 November 1944 when she joined the screen of carriers covering the convoy routes to newly invaded Leyte. On 21 December, while escorting the first resupply echelon to Mindoro, Converse came under attack by desperate Japanese suicide planes, and fired to drive them away as well as rescuing 266 survivors of LST-749. She gave fire support to the landings in Lingayen Gulf on 9 and 10 January 1945, and then joined the task unit assigned to recapture Corregidor. Her guns destroyed gun emplacements, barges, suicide boats, and entombed about 100 enemy troops by sealing the entrance to Malinta Tunnel.

After brief overhaul in Subic Bay, Converse patrolled off Corregidor until mid-March 1945, and from 18 March to 1 April joined in the invasion of Panay and Negros. Through the next month she carried out a variety of duties in the development of Iloilo as a staging center for the planned invasion of Japan. On 16 May, Converse arrived off Okinawa, where she operated on dangerous and demanding radar picket duty until the close of the war. Often firing to drive off suicide-bent Japanese aircraft, she received no damage during the difficult months that followed.

On 10 September she sailed from Okinawa for Pearl Harbor, the Panama Canal, and Washington, D.C., where on 19 October, the ceremonial award of the Presidential Unit Citation was made to her squadron. After overhaul at Brooklyn, she was decommissioned and placed in reserve at Charleston, South Carolina, 23 April 1946.

In addition to the Presidential Unit Citation, Converse received 11 battle stars for World War II service.

== Almirante Valdés (D23) ==
On 1 July 1959 Converse was transferred under the Mutual Assistance Program to Spain, where she was renamed Almirante Valdés (D23).

The ship was stricken 17 November 1986 and scrapped in 1988.
