= William Faxon =

2nd United States Assistant Secretary of the Navy from 1866 to 1869

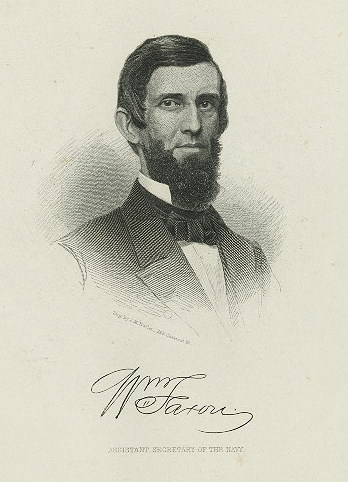

2nd Assistant Secretary of the Navy
- In office June 1, 1866 – March 3, 1869
- President: Andrew Johnson
- Preceded by: Gustavus Vasa Fox
- Succeeded by: James R. Soley (1890)

Personal details
- Born: William Faxon; April 17, 1822 West Hartford, Hartford County, Connecticut, United States
- Died: September 19, 1883 (aged 61)
- Resting place: Hartford, Connecticut

William Faxon (April 17, 1822 – September 19, 1883) was a journalist who served as chief clerk of the United States Navy from 1861 to 1866 and as United States Assistant Secretary of the Navy from 1866 until 1869.

== Biography ==
In 1857, Faxon formed a partnership with Joseph Roswell Hawley, Faxon & Hawley, which purchased the Hartford Evening Press, a Republican newspaper founded by Gideon Welles in 1856. They soon invited Charles Dudley Warner and Stephen A. Hubbard to join their newspaper.

In 1861, President of the United States Abraham Lincoln appointed Gideon Welles as United States Secretary of the Navy. Welles wanted to appoint Faxon as chief clerk of the Navy at this time, but the politically influential Francis Preston Blair and his son Montgomery Blair pressured Lincoln to appoint Gustavus Fox instead. As a compromise, the post of Assistant Secretary of the Navy was created for Fox, and Faxon joined the United States Department of the Navy as a clerk in March 1861, and then succeeded Fox as chief clerk on July 31, 1861. As chief clerk of the Navy during the American Civil War, Faxon was in charge of the records, correspondence, and personnel of the Office of the Secretary of the Navy and oversaw the finances of the Department of the Navy. On June 1, 1866, Faxon succeeded Fox as Assistant Secretary of the Navy, holding this office until 1869.

Faxon died in 1883.

Government offices
Preceded by Gustavus Fox	Assistant Secretary of the Navy; June 1, 1866 – March 3, 1869	Succeeded by James R. Soley
