= Herbert R. Askins =

U.S. Assistant Secretary of the Navy (1898–1982)

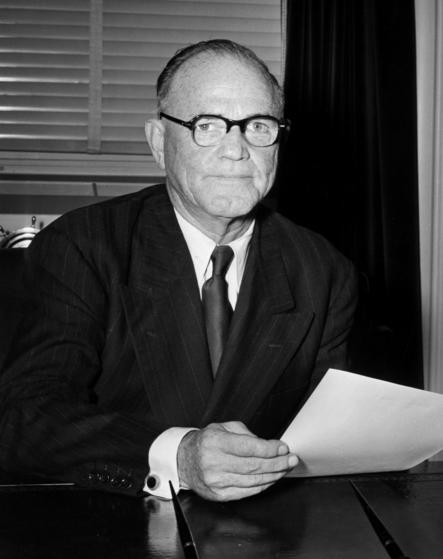

25th Assistant Secretary of the Navy
- In office October 3, 1951 – January 20, 1953
- President: Harry S. Truman
- Preceded by: John T. Koehler
- Succeeded by: Raymond H. Fogler

Personal details
- Born: November 12, 1898
- Died: December 12, 1982 (aged 84)

Herbert Rowland Askins (November 12, 1898 – December 1982) of Arizona was United States Assistant Secretary of the Navy from October 3, 1951, until January 20, 1953.

Government offices
| Preceded by John T. Koehler | Assistant Secretary of the Navy; October 3, 1951 – January 20, 1953 | Succeeded by Raymond H. Fogler |
