= Official Records of the Union and Confederate Armies =

Collection of Civil War records

The Official Records of the Union and Confederate Armies in the War of the Rebellion, commonly known as the Official Records of the Union and Confederate Armies or Official Records (OR or ORs), is the most extensive collection of American Civil War land warfare records available to the general public. It includes selected first-hand accounts, orders, reports, maps, diagrams, and correspondence drawn from official records of both Union and Confederate armies.

== History ==
Collection of the records began in 1864; no special attention was paid to Confederate records until just after the capture of Richmond, Virginia, in 1865, when with the help of Confederate Gen. Samuel Cooper, Union Army Chief of Staff Maj. Gen. Henry W. Halleck began the task of collecting and preserving such archives of the Confederacy as had survived the war. In 1866 a joint resolution of Congress authorized the compilation and publication under auspices of the War Department. Eventually, seventeen Secretaries of War were involved in the process. In 1877, Army Captain Robert N. Scott was appointed by the Secretary of War as director of the Publications Office, War Records. (Scott's name appears in each volume as the preparer, listed with the rank of brevet lieutenant colonel, 3rd U.S. Artillery.)

== Structure and content ==
The original title for the records was The Official Records of the War of the Rebellion and they were later renamed The War of the Rebellion: a Compilation of the Official Records of the Union and Confederate Armies, which has led to some lasting controversy over the official name for the war. As finally published, the records consist of 138,579 pages with 1,006 maps and diagrams assembled in 128 books, organized as 70 volumes grouped in four series, published between 1881 and 1901. Each of the four series of books in the compilation is divided into "volumes" numbered from the beginning of the series with Roman numerals. In series II, III, and IV each "volume" coincides with a book. In series I, however, it was found to be usually impracticable, beginning with volume X, to confine "volumes," as units of content, within single books. Volume X and most subsequent volumes in series I were therefore issued in "parts" distinguished by subsidiary Roman numerals, each occupying a separate book. Beginning with volume XXIV, Arabic "serial numbers" were also printed on the backs of the books issued, although these numbers were not included on the title pages, and are therefore not universally used in citations.

Series I — Military Operations
Formal reports, both Union and Confederate, of the first seizures of United States property in the southern States, and of all military operations in the field, with the correspondence, orders, and returns relating specially thereto (Serial Nos. 1-111)
Series II — Prisoners
Correspondence, orders, reports, and returns, Union and Confederate, relating to prisoners of war and (so far as the military authorities were concerned) to State or political prisoners (Serial Nos. 114-121)
Series III — Union Authorities
Correspondence, orders, reports, and returns of the Union authorities (including their correspondence with the Confederate officials) not relating specifically to the subjects of series I and II. It includes the annual and special reports of the Secretary of War, of the General-in-Chief, and of the chiefs of the several staff corps and departments; the calls for troops and the correspondence between the National and the several State authorities (Serial Nos. 122-126)
Series IV — Confederate Authorities
Correspondence, orders, reports, and returns of the Confederate authorities, similar to the Union material in series III, but excluding the correspondence between the Union and Confederate authorities given in that series (Serial Nos. 127-129)

A final comprehensive index (Serial No. 130) was published in 1901 with remaining additions and corrections.

A companion volume, the Atlas to Accompany the Official Records of the Union and Confederate Armies, was published in 1895. It included maps of military operations (175 plates), a topographic map of the area of operations (26 plates), and some drawings of weapons, uniforms, insignia, and flags.

In 1966, the U.S. National Archives began publication of a five-volume set that comprised an arguably superior index to the Army ORs, Military Operations of the Civil War: A Guide Index to the Official Records of the Union and Confederate Armies, 1861-1865, microfilm publication M1026. Introductory material to the guide-index offers guidance to readers of the ORs:

Documents printed in Official Records, Armies, were copied, for the most part, directly into type from the originals by printers of the War Department printing establishment. These printers had their trade's long tradition of competence in putting manuscript into and correcting errors. They may not have been sophisticated about scholarly requirements for the reproduction of historical documents in print, but they were aware of the sort of problems involved and dealt with them according to shop practice, rich experience, and commonsense. A large part of the content of the compilation had already been printed as "preliminary prints" before the publication project received any proper editorial direction. The sheer bulk of the material involved prevented any meticulous wholesale review of the copying process by the editors responsible for the eventual publication. There were, of course, errors made during the copying process that did not get corrected or noticed in lists of errata. They were generally printers' errors, however, resulting from carelessness, difficulty in reading the manuscript, ignorance of proper names, and the like. Since the documents were printed a second time from the preliminary prints, at the Government Printing Office, it is a wonder that there are not more mistakes of transcription.

Editorial tinkering with the texts of documents is a possibility that must be kept in mind, particularly if the subject matter suggests it. There cannot have been much such tinkering, however, for the editors had their hands full organizing the material to go into successive books. The numerous appendixes of material that did not get into its proper place, and the extent of the five supplemental volumes can give us some idea of how demanding and distracting this task must have been.

The point is that anyone using the army-records compilation should watch more intently for faults of editorship than for faults of transcription. Some editorial mistakes are inconsequential but others are egregious, the total of such mistakes is very large. The editorship was not rigorous in any scholarly or scientific sense; it was empirical and relatively uncritical.

Because of the enormous volume of material, the lengthy time period of collection and publication, and the constant and continuing process of correction by veterans of both sides still living contemporaneously, the records are perhaps the most intensely peer-reviewed documents in historical publication. Historians have argued that some of the modifications made years after the events have decreased the accuracy of the records and were made simply to enhance personal reputations (or to denigrate the reputations of rivals).

An additional 100 volumes of previously unpublished reports and correspondence were published by the Broadfoot Publishing Company of Wilmington, North Carolina, from 1995 to 1999, entitled Supplement to the Official Records Of the Union and Confederate Armies.

== See also ==
- Confederate Military History
- Official Records of the Union and Confederate Navies

== Sources ==
- Aimone, Alan C., and Aimone, Barbara A., A User's Guide to the Official Records of the American Civil War, White Mane Publishing Company, 1992, ISBN 0-942597-38-9.
- Hewett, Janet B., "Updating the Documentary History of the U.S. Civil War", Journal of Government Information, Vol. 26, No. 1, 1999.
- Sauers, Richard A., "The War of the Rebellion (Official Records)", Encyclopedia of the American Civil War: A Political, Social, and Military History, Heidler, David S., and Heidler, Jeanne T., eds., W. W. Norton & Company, 2000, ISBN 0-393-04758-X.
- U.S. National Archives, Military Operations of the Civil War: A Guide Index to the Official Records of the Union and Confederate Armies, 1861-1865, National Archives microfilm publication M1026, 1966–1980.
