= War of the Rebellion Atlas =

The Atlas to Accompany the Official Records of the Union and Confederate Armies (also referred to as the War of the Rebellion Atlas) was published as a companion piece to the Official Records of the American Civil War. It contains maps and other images derived from materials generated by both Union and Confederate military personnel during the American Civil War.

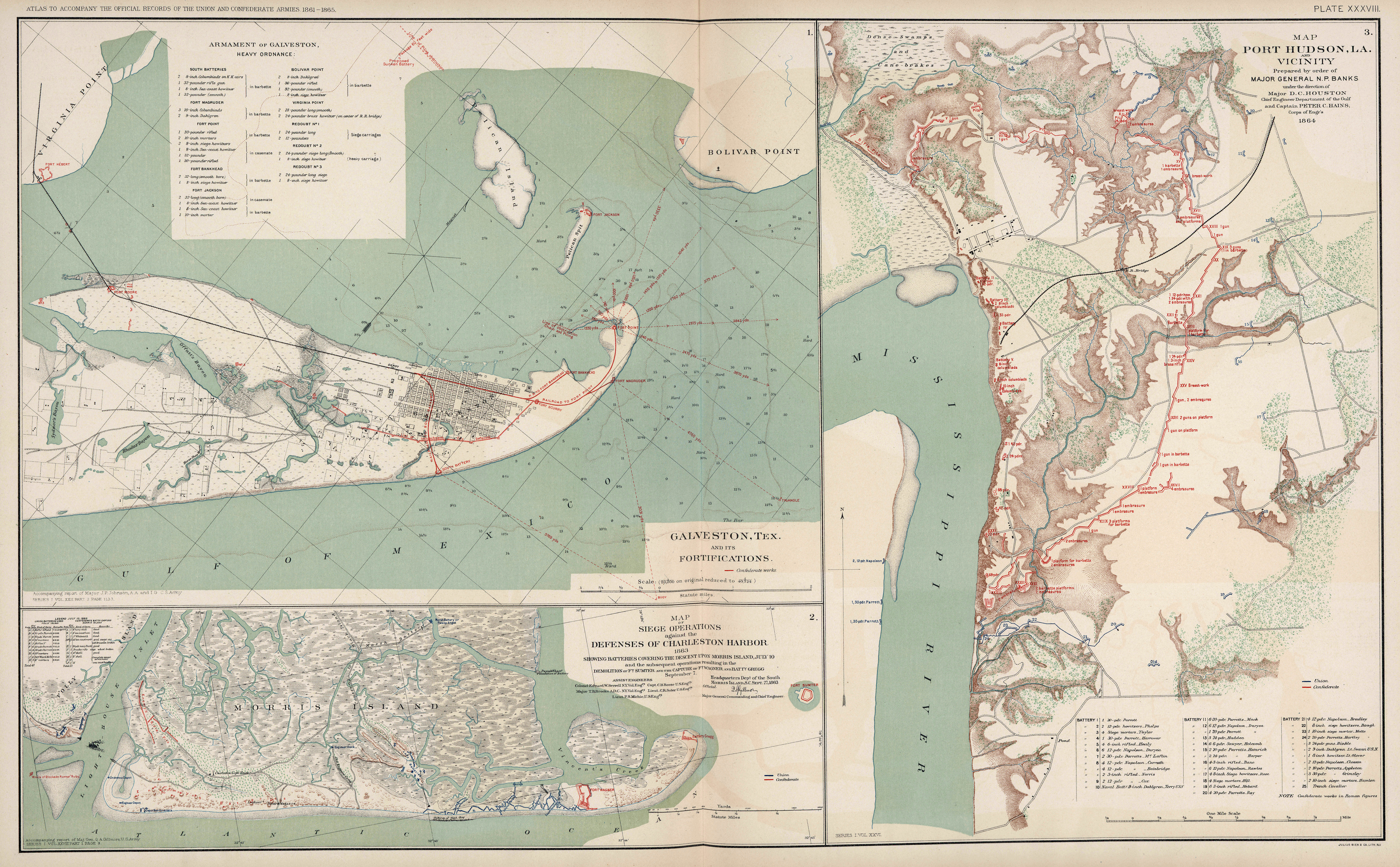
War of the Rebellion Atlas Plate 38, featuring maps of Galveston, TX; Charleston Harbor; and Port Hudson, Louisiana

== Creation and composition ==
The Atlas was published by the United States Department of War in 1895. It features maps of engagements large and small including Gettysburg, the Siege of Vicksburg, Shiloh and the various epochs of the Atlanta campaign.

The Atlas is composed of 178 plates containing more than 1,050 individual graphic elements. Graphic elements include maps, line art illustrations derived from photographs, technical drawings, and other illustrations.

== Content ==
The Atlas contains three general types of illustrations: maps, illustrations based on photographs, and illustrations/technical drawings.

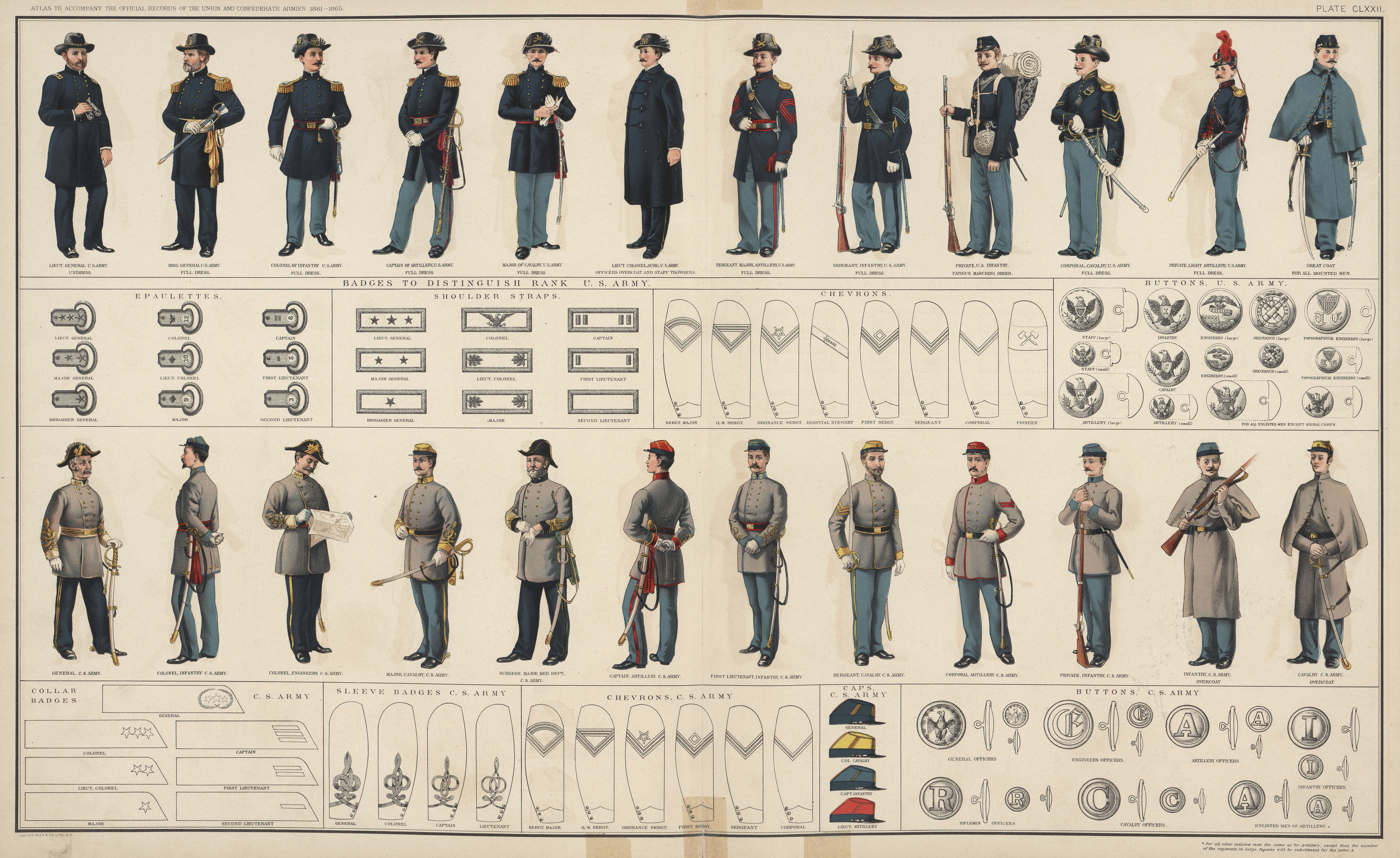
Illustrations of uniforms worn by Union and Confederate soldiers, from the War of the Rebellion Atlas Plate 172

- Maps

A total of 156 plates containing maps ranging from small-scale engagements to regional views and date-specific snapshots of long-running sieges like Vicksburg and Atlanta.

- Illustrations based on photographs

Twelve (12) plates that include images of Charleston Harbor and Fort Sumter, Missionary Ridge and various elements of mid-nineteenth century warfare.

Illustrations based on photographs
Plate name (Roman)	Plate number (Arabic)	Digital image no. (page)	Title	Detail
Pl. CXXI	Plate 121	146	Views of forts in Charleston Harbor (SC)	View of Terre Plein on the Gorge of Fort Sumter - Parade of Fort Moultrie - Northwestern Angle of Fort Moultrie - View of Terre Plein and Parapet of Eastern Flank of Fort Sumter - Barracks on North Face of Parade, Fort Moultrie - Southwestern Angle and Face of Fort Moultrie - Officers Quarters, Eastern Portion of Parade, Fort Moultrie - Western Barracks, Fort Moultrie - Channel Face and Southwestern Angle of the Ramparts of Fort Moultrie
Pl. CXXII	Plate 122	147	Views of forts in Charleston Harbor (SC)	Exterior View of the Gorge of Fort Sumter on the 14th April 1865 (x4) - Channel Face of Fort Moultrie with Bomb Proof Shelter and Flag Staff - Fort Sumter, December 9th, 1863 - Sullivan's Island Battery, Beauregard 1864 - Fort Sumter, December 9th, 1863 - Fort Sumter, December 9th, 1863, View from Southwest Angle - Sullivan's Island, Fort Moultrie, 1864 - Fort Sumter, December 9th, 1863, View of Entrance to Three-Gun Battery
Pl. CXXIII	Plate 123	148	Views of Chattanooga, Missionary Ridge (TN)	Chattanooga, Tenn. from Cameron Hill - U.S. Military Bridge Over the Tennessee at Chattanooga - Part of Missionary Ridge, Tenn. (x2) - Govt. Wagon Yard at Chattanooga, Tenn. - Blockhouse for Defense of Railroad Yard at Chattanooga, Tenn. - The Suck _ Tenn. River Below Chattanooga (x2)
Pl. CXXIV	Plate 124	149	Views of Nashville (TN), Lookout Mountain (TN), Rossville Gap (GA), Buzzard Roost Gap and Rocky Face Ridge (GA), Dutch Gap (VA), Broadway (VA), Spofford (VA)	
Pl. CXXV	Plate 125	150	Views defenses in Sawyer (VA), Pruyn (VA), Carpenter (VA), Anderson (VA), McConihe (VA), Dutton (VA), Drake (VA), Richmond (VA), Pontoon bridge, James River (VA)	
Pl. CXXVI	Plate 126	151	Views in Richmond (VA), City Point (VA), Atlanta (GA)	
Pl. CXXVII	Plate 127	152	Views in Atlanta (GA)	
Pl. CXXVIII	Plate 128	153	Views in Atlanta (GA)	
Pl. CXXIX	Plate 129	154	Views of Atlanta (GA), Chattanooga (TN), Position of the Iron clads	Rebel lines, Atlanta - Rebel line on Augusta, R.R. Atlanta, Ga. - Rebel lines on west side of Atlanta, Ga. - Rebel lines, Atlanta, Ga. - U.S. rolling mill at Chattanooga, Tenn. - Ruins of rolling mill and cars - Round-house Chattanooga R.R. at Atlanta, Ga. - Engine "Hero" - Position of Iron Clads, January 15th, 1865
Pl. CXXX	Plate 130	155	Views of Knoxville (TN), Chattanooga (TN)	Panoramic view of Knoxville - Knoxville from Fort Stanley, 1864 - Panoramic view of Knoxville from cupola of University of East Tennessee, 1864 - Chattanooga, 1864 - Knoxville from Mabry's Hill - Chattanooga, 1864

- Illustrations and technical drawings

Ten (10) plates containing diagrams of defensive elements (redoubts, redans, and forts, for example), equipment and armaments, uniforms, and flags.

== Digitization by Baylor University ==
In the fall of 2010, the Digitization Projects Group of the Baylor University Electronic Library digitized an extremely high quality copy of the Atlas and placed the plates online via their Digital Collections site. The collection is searchable by keywords including state, city, military personnel and battle names, among others.

== See also ==
- Bibliography of the American Civil War
