= Raymond H. Fogler =

American politician (1892–1996)

Raymond Henry Fogler (February 29, 1892 – January 10, 1996) was an executive who served as the United States Assistant Secretary of the Navy from 1953 to 1954.

== Biography ==
Raymond H. Fogler was born in Hope, Maine and educated at the University of Maine, receiving a bachelor's degree in biology in 1915. He received a master's degree from Princeton University and then returned to Maine to become executive secretary of the Agriculture Extension Service. He later moved to New York City and began a career in business. He worked at W. T. Grant and Montgomery Ward, ultimately serving as president of each of those companies. While running Montgomery Ward, he was instrumental in choosing Robert May's story of Rudolph the Red-nosed Reindeer as it first appeared in a 1939 booklet written by Robert L. May and published by Montgomery Ward, the department store

In 1953, President of the United States Dwight D. Eisenhower nominated Fogler as Assistant Secretary of the Navy and Fogler held this position from June 22, 1953 (the date of his Senate confirmation), to January 12, 1957 (effectively for Eisenhower's entire 1st term). Fogler was the last Assistant Secretary of the Navy, as the post was abolished in 1954.

In addition to his work in business and his time in government, Fogler remained active with his alma mater, the University of Maine, serving on its Board of Directors from 1955 to 1962. In 1962, the University of Maine's main library was renamed the Raymond H. Fogler Library in Fogler's honor.

His grandson was actor Charles Rocket.

Fogler died in 1996 at the age of 103.

Government offices
Preceded by Herbert R. Askins	Assistant Secretary of the Navy; June 22, 1953 – October 4, 1954	Succeeded by Office Abolished
