= Bureau of Navigation (United States Navy) =

Former bureau of the U.S. Navy (1862-1942)

The U.S. Navy's Bureau of Navigation was established in 1862 as part of the reorganization of the Navy Department. Principal responsibilities were to provide nautical charts and instruments and to oversee several activities involved navigation research, including the Naval Observatory. In 1889, the Bureau gained responsibilities for personnel management, and this eventually became its primary function. In 1942, the Bureau was renamed the Bureau of Naval Personnel (BuPers), under which name it continues today.

This bureau is not to be confused with the federal Bureau of Navigation (later the Bureau of Navigation and Steamboat Inspection), established in 1884 to oversee commercial shipping and navigation.

== Early years, 1862 to 1889 ==
The Navy's Bureau of Navigation was one of three bureaus created by Congress on July 5, 1862, to supersede the Bureau of Construction, Equipment, and Repair, one of the original Navy Department bureaus established on August 31, 1842, to replace the Board of Navy Commissioners.

The new Bureau was initially responsible for providing nautical charts and instruments and for supervising the US Naval Observatory, the Hydrographic Office, and the Nautical Almanac Office. It also had responsibility for the United States Naval Academy, which previously under been under the jurisdiction of the Bureau of Ordnance and Hydrography. In 1867, the Navy Department took the Academy under direct supervision, but for many years the Bureau of Navigation continued to provide routine administration and financial management.

From 1865 to 1884, the Bureau was responsible for the Office of Detail, which handled the assignment and detailing of naval officers. That Office had been established in March 1861, just prior to the outbreak of the Civil War, in the Office of the Secretary of the Navy. The Office of Detail reverted to the Secretary's office on October 1, 1884, but was restored to the Bureau of Navigation a few months later, May 22, 1885. The Office of Detail was reorganized within the Bureau in 1889 as the Division of Officers and Fleet.

== Reorganization and acquisition of personnel functions, 1889 ==
The Bureau of Navigation permanently acquired personnel responsibilities in the late 1880s, as part of a Navy Department reorganization. The Bureau exchanged functions with the Bureau of Equipment and Recruiting on June 30, 1889, becoming responsible for enlisted personnel matters. The Bureau of Equipment and Recruiting (later renamed the Bureau of Equipment) acquired responsibility for the Naval Observatory, the Nautical Almanac Office and several other equipment-related offices. Responsibility for the Hydrographic Office was acquired from the Bureau of Navigation nine years, later on May 9, 1898.

The Hydrographic Office and the Naval Observatory (which had taken over the Nautical Almanac Office) returned to the Bureau of Navigation in July 1910. This followed an act of Congress of June 24, 1910, which dispersed the functions of the Bureau of Equipment.

On November 18, 1909, the Bureau of Navigation became part of the Navy Department's newly established Division of Personnel. Status as an autonomous bureau was regained when the Division of Personnel was abolished on April 25, 1913.

== Becoming the Bureau of Naval Personnel, 1942 ==
The shift in focus from navigation to personnel management, brought a change in name during World War II. In 1942, the Bureau of Navigation was redesignated the Bureau of Naval Personnel (BuPers), under which name it still exists today. The Hydrographic Office and the Naval Observatory were transferred to the Office of the Chief of Naval Operations.

== Commanders ==
The following were the Commanders of the Bureau until the role was replaced by that of the chief of naval personnel.

- 1862-1865 RADM Charles Henry Davis
- 1865-1865 CAPT Percival Drayton
- 1865-1865 RADM David Dixon Porter
- 1865-1869 COMMO Thornton A. Jenkins
- 1869-1871 RADM James Alden Jr.
- 1871-1878 COMMO Daniel Ammen
- 1878-1881 COMMO William D. Whiting
- 1881-1889 CAPT John D.G. Walker
- 1889-1897 COMMO Francis Munroe Ramsay
- 1897-1902 RADM Arent S. Crowninshield
- 1902-1904 RADM Henry C. Taylor
- 1904-1907 RADM George A. Converse
- 1907-1907 RADM William H. Brownson
- 1908-1909 RADM John E. Pillsbury
- 1909-1909 RADM William P. Potter
- 1909-1912 RADM Reginald F. Nicholson
- 1912-1913 RADM Philip Andrews
- 1913-1916 RADM Victor Blue
- 1916-1918 RADM Leigh C. Palmer
- 1918-1919 RADM Victor Blue
- 1919 1923 RADM Thomas Washington
- 1923-1924 RADM Andrew T. Long
- 1924-1927 RADM William R. Shoemaker
- 1927-1930 RADM Richard H. Leigh
- 1930-1933 RADM Frank B. Upham
- 1933-1935 RADM William D. Leahy
- 1935-1938 RADM Adolphus Andrews
- 1938-1939 RADM James O. Richardson
- 1939-1941 RADM Chester W. Nimitz
- 1941- RADM Randall Jacobs - organization became Bureau of Naval Personnel.
