= Lewis Compton =

U.S. Navy officer (1892–1942)

Lewis S. Compton
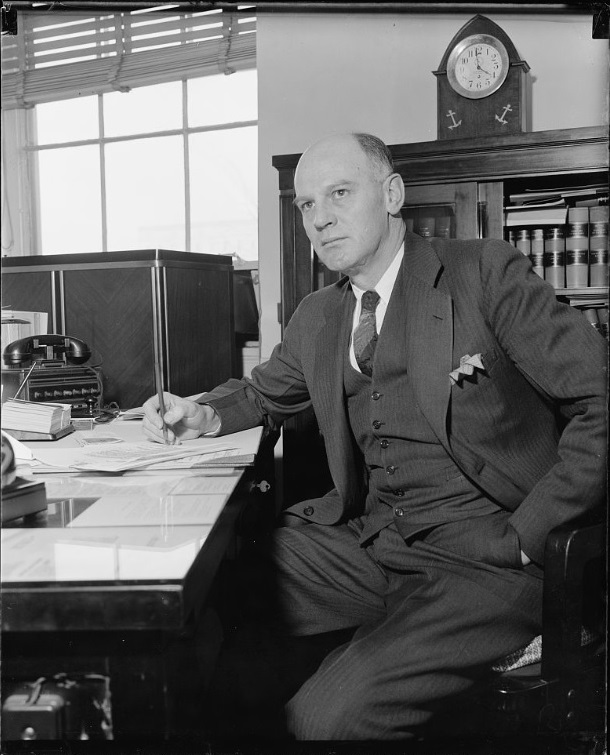
- Harris & Ewing photo, c. 1940

19th Assistant Secretary of the Navy
- In office February 9, 1940 – February 13, 1941
- President: Franklin D. Roosevelt
- Preceded by: Charles Edison
- Succeeded by: Ralph Austin Bard

Personal details
- Born: November 7, 1892 Perth Amboy, New Jersey, U.S.
- Died: October 24, 1942 (aged 49) New York City, U.S.
- Party: Democratic
- Spouse: Beatrice Vincent
- Children: 2
- Occupation: Naval officer; politician; civil servant

Lewis S. Compton (November 7, 1892 – October 24, 1942) was an officer in the United States Navy during World War I. He served roles in the municipal government of Metuchen, New Jersey, as well as the state of New Jersey. He was Assistant Secretary of the Navy from 1940 to 1941.

== Early life ==
Lewis S. Compton was born on November 7, 1892, in Perth Amboy, New Jersey. From a young age, he sailed boats. He attended public schools in Perth Amboy and graduated from Phillips Exeter Academy. He enrolled in the United States Naval Reserve on March 22, 1917. He also joined the New Jersey Naval Militia.

== Career ==
Compton served in World War I. He commanded the patrol boat USS Nirvana and served as assistant navigating officer on the transport ship USS Mallory. He attained the rank of lieutenant in the U.S. Naval Reserve and attained the rank of lieutenant commander with the New Jersey Naval Militia. He served in the coding section of naval communications in Washington, D.C., until 1920. He continued to take part in training until resigning from the Reserve on July 1, 1932. He commanded the USS Eagle 48 and the 26th Fleet Division of the Reserve. He successfully campaigned to have the Navy armory moved to Perth Amboy.

Compton moved to Metuchen, New Jersey, and started an automobile and real estate business. He had a garage on Middlesex Avenue in Metuchen. He was a Democrat and served three terms on the Metuchen Council up until 1929. He was then elected to the Middlesex County Board of Chosen Freeholders and led the finance department. He was chairman of the board for one year. In 1932, when Democrats took control of the Metuchen Council, he initiated reforms in the municipal government to reduce the number of departments to three. In 1934, he became state director of emergency relief. In 1936, he became assistant state relief administrator of the Works Progress Administration.

In 1936, Compton became special assistant to Charles Edison, the Assistant Secretary of the Navy. He served as Assistant Secretary of the Navy from February 9, 1940 to February 13, 1941, under Edison, who was now Secretary of the Navy. He then served as financial commissioner of New Jersey under governor Charles Edison. He served an executive role on the National Shipbuilders Council.

== Personal life ==
Compton married Beatrice Vincent of Perth Amboy. They had two children, James and Camille. He lived on Robins Place in Metuchen. He was a member of the Sons of the Revolution and the Fugle Hummer Post of the American Legion in Metuchen.

Compton died on October 24, 1942, following an operation at Post-Graduate Hospital in New York City.

== Legacy ==
USS Compton (DD-705) was named for him.

Government offices
Preceded by Charles Edison	Assistant Secretary of the Navy; February 9, 1940 – February 13, 1941	Succeeded by Ralph Austin Bard
