= USLHT Mangrove =

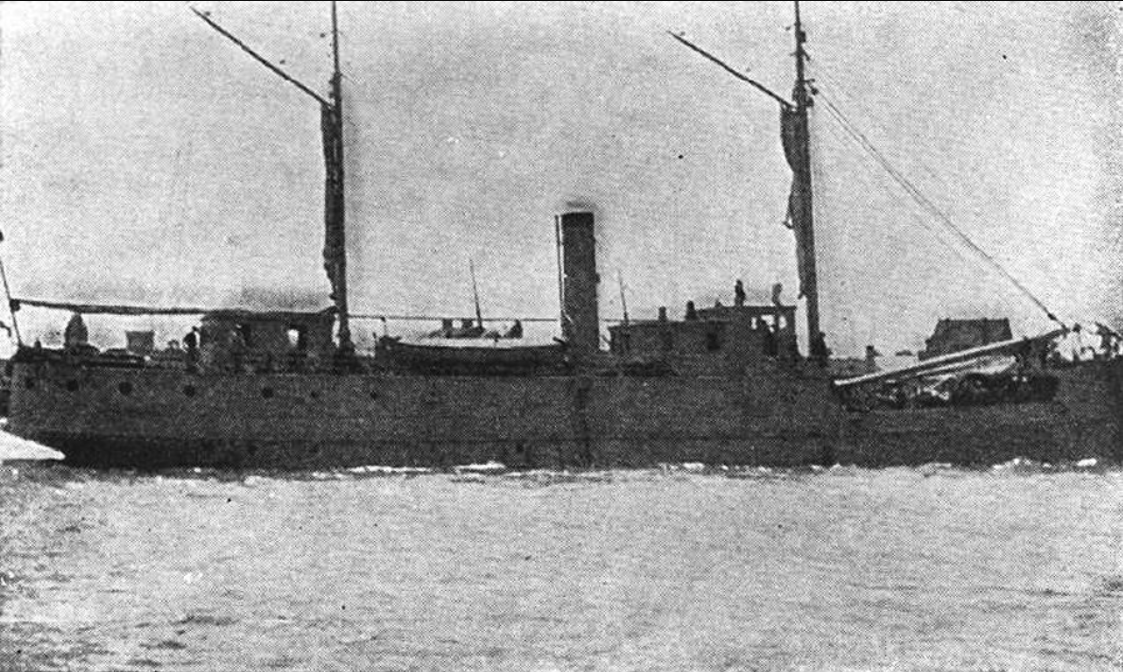
- Mangrove in 1898 during the Spanish–American War.

History

United States Lighthouse Board
- Name: USLHT Mangrove
- Namesake: Mangrove, a shrub or small tree that grows in coastal saline or brackish water
- Builder: Crescent Shipyard, Elizabethport, New Jersey
- Cost: $74,997.63
- Completed: 1897
- Commissioned: 1 December 1897
- Fate: Transferred to U.S. Navy 10 April 1898
- Acquired: 18 August 1898 (from U.S. Navy)
- Fate: Transferred to U.S. Lighthouse Service 1910

United States
- Name: USS Mangrove
- Namesake: Previous name retained
- Acquired: 10 April 1898 (from U.S. Lighthouse Board)
- Fate: Transferred to U.S. Lighthouse Board 18 August 1898
- Acquired: 11 April 1917 (from U.S. Lighthouse Service)
- Fate: Transferred to U.S. Lighthouse Service 1 July 1919
- Acquired: 1 November 1941 (from U.S. Coast Guard)
- Fate: Transferred to U.S. Coast Guard 1 January 1946

United States Lighthouse Service
- Name: USLHT Mangrove
- Namesake: Previous name retained
- Acquired: 1910 (from U.S. Lighthouse Board)
- Fate: Transferred to U.S. Navy 11 April 1917
- Acquired: 1 July 1919 (from U.S. Navy)
- Fate: Transferred to U.S. Coast Guard 1 July 1939

United States Coast Guard
- Name: USCGC Mangrove (WAGL-232)
- Namesake: Previous name retained
- Acquired: 1 July 1939 (from U.S. Lighthouse Service)
- Reclassified: WAGL-232
- Fate: Transferred to U.S. Navy 1 November 1941
- Acquired: 1 January 1946 (from U.S. Navy)
- Decommissioned: 22 August 1946
- Fate: Sold for scrapping 6 May 1947

General characteristics
- Type: Lighthouse tender
- Displacement: 1897: 821 long tons (834 t); 1919: 572 long tons (581 t)
- Length: 164 ft (50.0 m) (overall)
- Beam: 30 ft (9.1 m)
- Draft: 1897: 8 ft 6 in (2.6 m); 1919: 12 ft (3.7 m)
- Propulsion: 1897: Two coal-fired Page and Burton water-tube boilers, two 650-shp (550-kW) compound inverted reciprocating steam engines, two shafts; 1919: 550 ihp (465 kW)
- Speed: 10 knots
- Complement: 1897: 31; 1919: 29; 1945: 40
- Armament: 1898: 2 × quick-firing guns (during U.S. Navy service); 1945: 2 x 20 mm mounts (during U.S. Navy service)

USLHT Mangrove was a lighthouse tender in commission in the fleet of the United States Lighthouse Board from December 1897 to April 1898 and from August 1898 to 1910, in the United States Lighthouse Service from 1910 to 1917 and from 1919 to 1939, and in the United States Coast Guard (as USCGC Mangrove) from 1939 to 1941 and in 1946. She also saw commissioned service in the United States Navy as USS Mangrove on three occasions, operating as an armed supply ship from April to August 1898 during the Spanish–American War, during which she fought the last battle of that war; as a patrol vessel from 1917 to 1919 during and in the aftermath of World War I; and as a buoy tender from 1941 to 1946 during and in the aftermath of World War II.

== Construction and commissioning ==
Mangrove was constructed by Crescent Shipyard in Elizabethport, New Jersey, for the United States Lighthouse Board and was completed in 1897. She was commissioned into service in the Lighthouse Board's fleet as USLHT Mangrove on 1 December 1897.

== Service history ==
=== 1897–1898 ===
Upon commissioning, Mangrove was assigned to the Seventh Lighthouse District, with her home port at Key West, Florida.

=== Spanish–American War ===
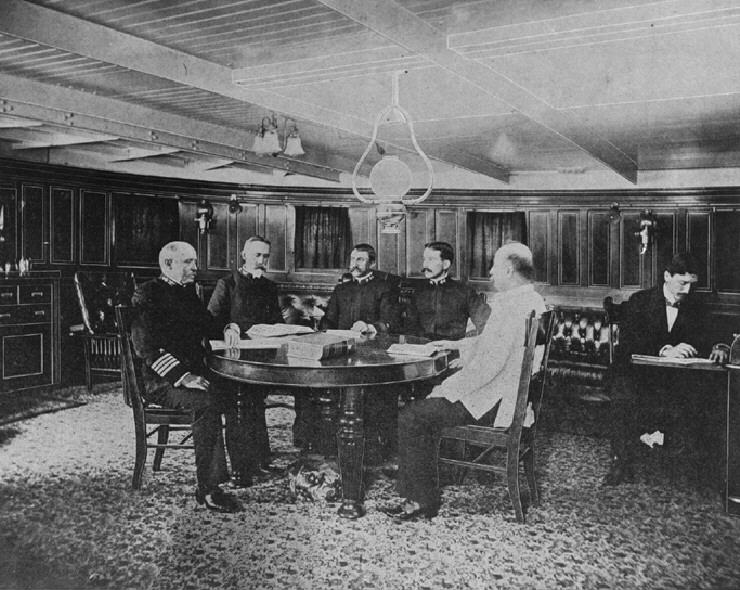
Photograph from the 12 April 1898 edition of Uncle Sam's Navy of the court of inquiry aboard USLHT Mangrove in Havana Harbor, ca. March 1898. From left are Captain French Ensor Chadwick, Captain William T. Sampson, Lieutenant Commander William P. Potter, Ensign W. V. Powelson, and Lieutenant Commander Adolph Marix.

After USS Maine – a United States Navy second-class battleship – exploded and sank while at anchor in the harbor at Havana, Cuba, on the evening of 15 February 1898, Mangrove transported wounded survivors of the disaster to Key West. In March 1898, while anchored in Havana Harbor, she served as a site for the U.S. Navy court of inquiry into the loss of Maine. She later made a voyage in which she carried guns salvaged from Maine′s wreck and civilians evacuating Cuba to the United States as the Spanish–American War broke out in April 1898.

On 10 April 1898, shortly before the war broke out, Mangrove was transferred to the U.S. Navy for war service. Armed with two quick-firing guns, she was commissioned into the U.S. Navy as USS Mangrove. She operated as an armed supply ship during the war.

==== Action off Caibarién ====
Under orders to support a Cuban military expedition aboard the schooners Dellie and Ellen F. Adams at Cayo Francés in the Bay of Buena Vista on the north-central coast of Cuba, Mangrove arrived at Cayo Francés on 12 August 1898 to find no sign of the schooners or the expedition. She found Dellie on the morning of 13 August, and a party from Dellie informed Mangrove's crew that Ellen F. Adams had disembarked her part of the expedition on 12 August and that Dellie planned to disembark hers on the morning of 14 August. Mangrove's commanding officer informed the party from Dellie that Mangrove would remain at Cayo Francés to ensure that Spanish Navy gunboats at nearby Caibarién did not interfere with Dellie′s disembarkation of her part of the expedition. Mangrove made an attempt to reach Caibarién on the afternoon of 13 August, but returned to Cayo Francés due to unfavorable tides. Near sundown on 13 August, she observed one of the Spanish gunboats underway near the harbor at Caibarién.

On the morning of 14 August 1898, Mangrove approached Caibarién and at about 10:55, when 2.5 nautical miles (4.6 km; 2.9 mi) east of the harbor there, sighted a large Spanish gunboat – which Mangrove′s crew identified as probably the gunboat Hernán Cortés – moored close inshore north of the harbor. Unable to bring both of her 6-pounders to bear at once, Mangrove opened fire on the gunboat with her port 6-pounder, firing slowly to get the range, and the gunboat immediately returned fire, firing her entire port broadside. After about five minutes, Mangrove switched to her starboard 6-pounder and continued firing slowly. All shots by both sides fell short. By 11:10, however, Mangrove was within range of the gunboat, and she steamed to the north and west for the next 25 minutes, keeping up a steady fire with her port 6-pounder. At 11:12, a small Spanish gunboat moored at Caibarién's city wharves joined the engagement, opening fire on Mangrove, but Mangrove was beyond her range; Mangrove fired a single round at her, but it fell short, and Mangrove then shifted fire back to the larger gunboat. At 11:25, Mangrove reversed course, steaming south and east and engaging the larger gunboat with her starboard 6-pounder, firing continuously with that gun until 11:45. At 11:27, she fired her 1-pounder at the larger gunboat as well, but the round fell short, and Mangrove made no further use of her 1-pounder during the engagement. The larger Spanish gunboat maintained a steady fire with her 4.7-inch (120 mm) guns as well and proved capable of reaching and even firing over Mangrove, so at 11:45 Mangrove′s commanding officer decided to cease fire and open the range in the hope of drawing the Spanish gunboat away from shore and give Mangrove a better chance of engaging her on more equal terms. The large Spanish gunboat also ceased fire as Mangrove drew away, but the smaller gunboat that had joined the engagement continued to fire at Mangrove ineffectively until 12:30. During the early afternoon, a Spanish party approached Mangrove aboard the smaller gunboat under a flag of truce and informed Mangrove's crew that word had arrived that hostilities between Spain and the United States had ceased on 13 August. Mangrove thus had the distinction of fighting the last battle of the Spanish–American War, albeit on the day after the war officially ended. During the engagement she had fired 103 armor-piercing shells from her 6-pounder and one armor-piercing shell from her 1-pounder.

Mangrove had taken no hits during the 14 August engagement. On the afternoon of 14 August, however, she ran aground while withdrawing from Caibarién, but she soon refloated herself and departed for Key West. The U.S. Navy transferred Mangrove back to the U.S. Lighthouse Board on 18 August 1898. The Navy cited Mangrove for her "conspicuous service" during the war.

=== 1898–1917 ===
After her return to the Lighthouse Board, Mangrove resumed her duties as a lighthouse tender, once again as USLHT Mangrove. The U.S. Lighthouse Board was abolished in 1910 and replaced by the new United States Lighthouse Service, and she became part of the Lighthouse Service fleet.

=== World War I ===
The United States entered World War I on 6 April 1917, and on 11 April 1917 Mangrove was transferred to the U.S. Navy for the second time. As USS Mangrove again, she operated as a patrol vessel during and in the immediate aftermath of the war. The U.S. Navy transferred her back to the U.S. Lighthouse Service on 1 July 1919.

=== 1919–1941 ===
As USLHT Mangrove, the ship again returned to lighthouse tender and buoy tender duty. In 1922, she was reassigned to the Sixth Lighthouse District, with her home port at Charleston, South Carolina. On 1 July 1939, the U.S. Lighthouse Service was abolished and the United States Coast Guard took over its responsibilities and assets, and Mangrove thus became part of the Coast Guard fleet as USCGC Mangrove.

=== World War II ===
On 1 November 1941, with World War II raging in Europe, North Africa, and the Middle East, the U.S. Coast Guard was transferred to the control of the U.S. Navy under Executive Order 8929, and Mangrove thus again came under U.S. Navy control only weeks before the United States entered the war on 7 December 1941. Given the hull classification symbol WAGL-232, she operated as a buoy tender in naval service, and by 1945 she was armed with two Oerlikon 20 mm cannon mounts. The Navy transferred her back to the U.S. Coast Guard on 1 January 1946.

=== 1946–1947 ===
The U.S. Coast Guard decommissioned the aging lighthouse tender – known once again as USCGC Mangrove – on 22 August 1946. After a career of nearly 50 years, she was sold for scrapping on 6 May 1947.
