= USS LST-749 =

American WWII tank landing ship

History

United States
- Name: USS LST-749
- Builder: Dravo Corporation, Neville Island, Pittsburgh
- Laid down: 10 April 1944
- Launched: 20 May 1944
- Commissioned: 23 June 1944
- Stricken: 19 January 1945
- Honours and awards: 1 battle star (World War II)
- Fate: Sunk in kamikaze attack, 21 December 1944

General characteristics
- Class & type: LST-542-class tank landing ship
- Displacement: 1,625 long tons (1,651 t) light; 4,080 long tons (4,145 t) full
- Length: 328 ft (100 m)
- Beam: 50 ft (15 m)
- Draft: Unloaded : 2 ft 4 in (0.71 m) forward; 7 ft 6 in (2.29 m) aft; Loaded : 8 ft 2 in (2.49 m) forward; 14 ft 1 in (4.29 m) aft
- Propulsion: 2 × General Motors 12-567 diesel engines, two shafts, twin rudders
- Speed: 12 knots (22 km/h; 14 mph)
- Boats & landing craft carried: 4 LCVPs
- Troops: 16 officers, 147 enlisted men
- Complement: 7 officers, 104 enlisted men
- Armament: 2 × twin 40 mm gun mounts w/Mk.51 directors; 4 × single 40 mm gun mounts; 12 × single 20 mm gun mounts

USS LST-749 was an LST-542-class tank landing ship in the United States Navy. Like many of her class, she was not named and is properly referred to by her hull designation.

Laid down on 10 April 1944 at Pittsburgh, Pennsylvania, by the Dravo Corporation, Neville Island; launched on 20 May 1944; sponsored by Mrs. George W. Scott; and commissioned on 23 June 1944.

== Service history ==
During World War II, LST 749 was assigned to the Pacific theater and participated in the Leyte landings in October and November 1944. On the way to Mindoro, Philippines, in the Sulu Sea, she was struck by a Japanese kamikaze on 21 December 1944. The plane crashed into the bridge of the LST, instantly killing many of the navy personnel on board. The LST was sinking and a first attempt at rescue was abandoned for fear of an explosion. Eventually many of the survivors were rescued by the crew of the destroyer USS Converse (DD-509). The ship was struck from the Navy list on 19 January 1945.

LST-749 earned one battle star for World War II service.
