= Katharine Bard =

American actress (1916–1983)

- Born: October 19, 1916; Highland Park, Illinois, U.S.
- Died: July 28, 1983 (aged 66); Los Angeles, California, U.S.
- Occupation: Actress
- Years active: 1947–1978
- Spouse: Martin Manulis (m. 1939)
- Children: 3
- Father: Ralph Bard

Katharine Bard (October 19, 1916 – July 28, 1983) was an American actress.

== Early life and education ==
Bard was born on October 19, 1916 in Highland Park, Illinois. She was the daughter of Ralph Bard, who served as assistant secretary of the U.S. Navy. She studied acting at the Embassy Dramatic School in London and the Group Theatre Studio in New York City.

== Career ==
She appeared in the films The Decks Ran Red, The Interns, Johnny Cool, Inside Daisy Clover and How to Save a Marriage and Ruin Your Life.

She appeared in the television series Suspense, Lux Video Theatre, The Millionaire, Studio One, Front Row Center, Studio 57, Goodyear Theatre, M Squad, Climax!, Alfred Hitchcock Presents, Gunsmoke, The Rifleman, Perry Mason, Peter Gunn, Playhouse 90, Sam Benedict, Alcoa Premiere, The Great Adventure, The Farmer's Daughter, The F.B.I., The Big Valley and Insight.

On Broadway, Bard appeared in All the Living, (1938), Jeremiah (1939), Life with Father (1939), Ring Around Elizabeth (1941), Lily of the Valley (1942), Three's a Family (1943), Made in Heaven (1946), The Hallams (1948), I Know My Love (1949), Pride's Crossing (1950), and The Long Days (1951). She also acted in London and Toronto and performed in summer theater in Bar Harbor, Maine.

In 1947-1948, she appeared as the title character in the syndicated version of the radio series Claudia.

== Personal life ==
Bard was married to Martin Manulis and stopped acting soon after they wed. The couple had three children.

== Death ==
She died on July 28, 1983 in Los Angeles, California, at UCLA Medical Center, aged 66, after suffering from cancer.

== Filmography ==
Year	Title	Role	Notes
1957	The Trial of Lizzie Borden, Omnibus	Lizzie Borden	The first play of an episode of Omnibus, presenting adaptations of the Lizzie Borden story
1958	Alfred Hitchcock Presents	Paula Frayne	Season 3 Episode 30: "Death Sentence"
1958	Gunsmoke	Ada Morton	Season 3 Episode 35: "Widows Mite"
1958	The Decks Ran Red	Joan Rummill	
1959	Perry Mason	Helen Dwight	Season 2 Episode 22 "The Case of the Lost Last Act"
1959	The Rifleman	Beth Landis	Season 1 Episode 24: "The Trade"
1962	The Alfred Hitchcock Hour	Caroline Sampson	Season 1 Episode 10: "Day of Reckoning"
1962	The Interns	Nurse Vicky Flynn	
1963	Johnny Cool	Mrs. Crandall	
1965	Inside Daisy Clover	Melora Swan	
1968	How to Save a Marriage and Ruin Your Life	Mary Hunter	
