= Shore facility =

Area for moving cargo and people from ships

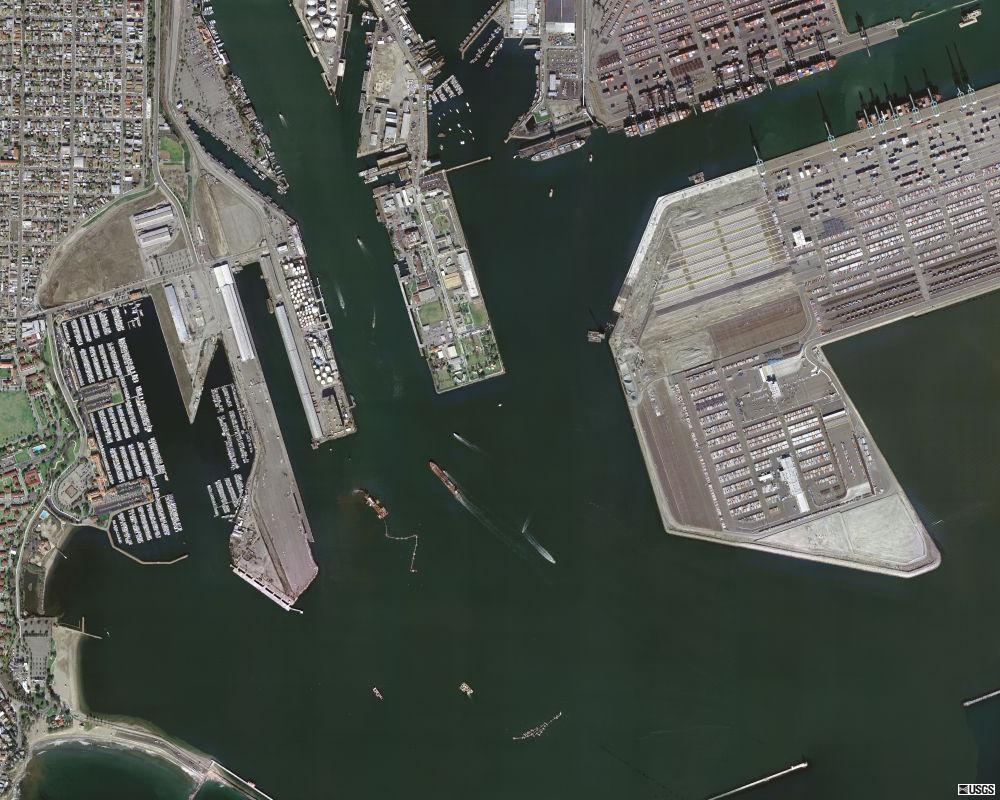
Port of Los Angeles, March 2004

A shore facility is one of the facilities located on shore used for receiving ships and transferring cargo and people to them. Ports and marinas constitute a collection of shore facilities. Shore facilities are designed for the efficient intermodal transportation of goods and people inland by trains, surface vehicles, and/or pipelines.

A shore facility may include magazine buildings or warehouses for storage of goods, fuel storage tanks or refrigerated storage.

It may include loading cranes, equipment laydown areas, dry docks and custom houses. It may have quays, wharfs, jetties, or slipways with cranes or ramps.

It may also have breakwaters, piers, or mooring dolphins.

== Shore power ==
Some shore facilities have shore based power facilities to supply electrical power to ships, especially in passenger and cruise terminals. Shore power facilities are used to reduce environmental and carbon emissions from ships while in port.

== MARPOL Convention ==
Shore facilities typically have infrastructure for the receival of waste products from ships, including sewage, garbage and other marine pollutants under the MARPOL Convention, referred to as 'shore reception facilities'.

== Maritime Labour Convention ==
The Maritime Labour Convention requires shore-based welfare facilities to be easily accessible to seafarers.
