= Charles Hial Darling =

American politician

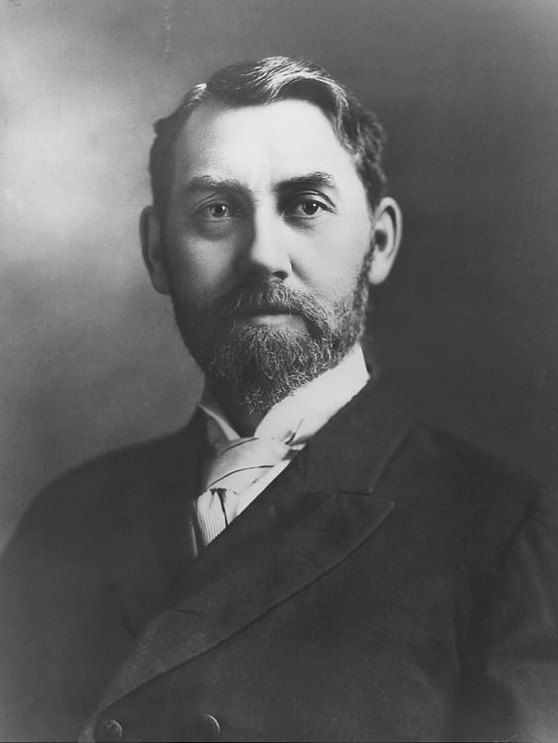

8th Assistant Secretary of the Navy
- In office December 1901 – November 1905
- President: Theodore Roosevelt
- Preceded by: Frank Warren Hackett
- Succeeded by: Truman Handy Newberry

Personal details
- Born: Charles Hial Darling; September 5, 1859
- Died: October 31, 1944 (aged 85)
- Occupation: Civilian administrator

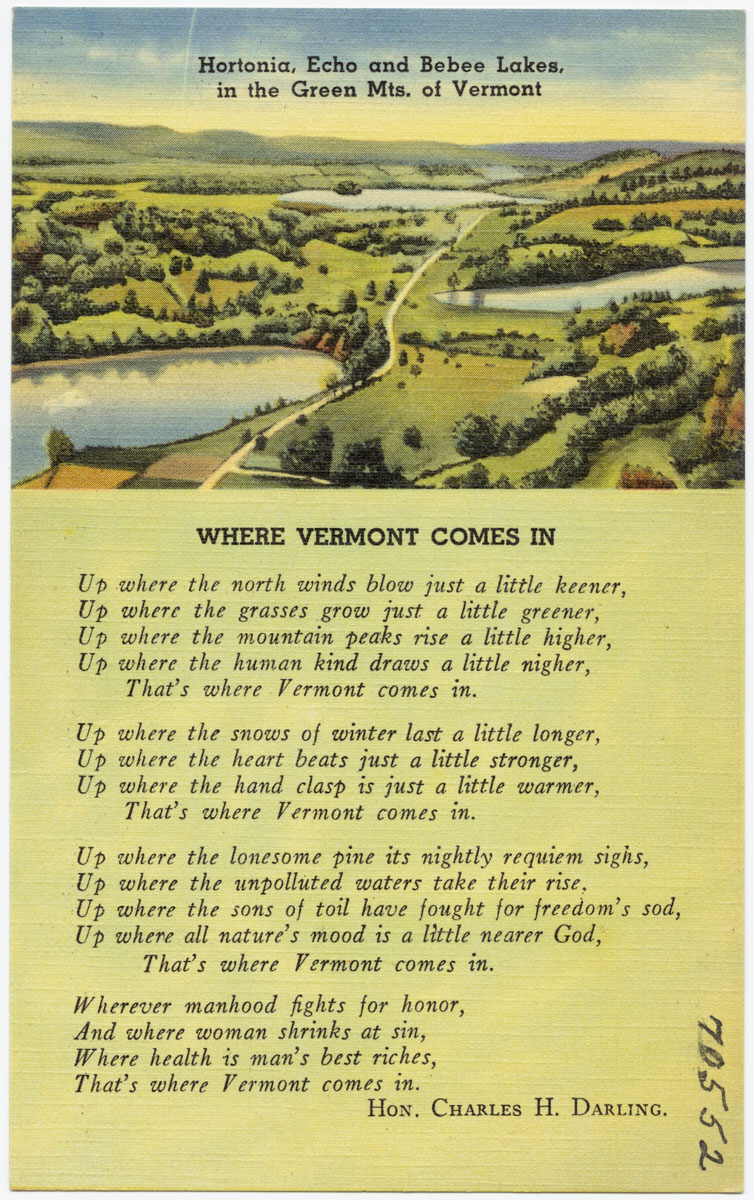
Text of Darling on postcard

Charles Hial Darling (May 9, 1859 – October 31, 1944) was United States Assistant Secretary of the Navy from 1901 to 1905.

== Biography ==
Darling was born in Woodstock, Vermont on May 9, 1859. He was educated at Green Mountain Perkins Academy and Montpelier Seminary, and went to college at Tufts, receiving his A.B. in 1884. He was admitted to the bar in 1886, and practiced in Bennington, Vermont as the partner of Orion M. Barber. A Republican, he was appointed as a municipal judge in 1887 by Governor of Vermont Ebenezer J. Ormsbee, and subsequently reappointed by each governor until 1901. In 1889, he married Agnes C. Norton of Bennington, and together the couple had three daughters, Margaret, Alice, and Elizabeth.

Darling was elected president of the village of Bennington in 1895, and in 1896–97, he represented the town of Bennington in the Vermont House of Representatives. He was elected president of the Vermont Bar Association in 1900.

In 1901, President of the United States Theodore Roosevelt nominated Darling as Assistant Secretary of the Navy. Darling held this office from December 17, 1901, until October 30, 1905.

Upon leaving Washington, D. C. in 1906, Darling settled in Burlington, Vermont.

Darling was active with the Sons of the American Revolution, serving as the Vermont society's president in 1908, and with the Vermont Historical Society, of which he was a life member. He was also an active Freemason.

== Sources ==
- Prentiss Cutler Dodge, Encyclopedia - Vermont Biography (Burlington Ullery Publishing Co., 1912): p. 163
- Walter Hill Crockett, Vermont: The Green Mount State (New York: Century History Co., 1921), p. 353
- Walter John Coates (ed.), A Bibliography of Vermont Poetry and Gazetteer of Vermont Poets (Montpelier: Vermont Historical Society, 1942)] [Vol. 1], p. 102.

Government offices
| Preceded by Frank W. Hackett | Assistant Secretary of the Navy; December 17, 1901 – October 30, 1905 | Succeeded by Truman Handy Newberry |
