= Assistant Secretary of the Navy =

Senior civilian official of the Department of the Navy, position abolished in 1954

The personal flag used by assistant secretaries of the Navy as well as the General Counsel of the Navy.

Assistant Secretary of the Navy (ASN) is the title given to certain civilian senior officials in the United States Department of the Navy.

From 1861 to 1954, the assistant secretary of the Navy was the second-highest civilian office in the Department of the Navy (reporting to the United States secretary of the Navy). That role has since been supplanted by the office of Under Secretary of the Navy and the office of Assistant Secretary of the Navy has been abolished. There have, however, been a number of offices bearing the phrase "Assistant Secretary of the Navy" in their title (see below for details).

At present, there are four assistant secretaries of the Navy, each of whom reports to and assists the secretary of the Navy and the under secretary of the Navy:

- Assistant Secretary of the Navy (Research, Development and Acquisition)
- Assistant Secretary of the Navy (Manpower and Reserve Affairs)
- Assistant Secretary of the Navy (Financial Management and Comptroller)
- Assistant Secretary of the Navy (Energy, Installations and Environment)
- The General Counsel of the Navy is equivalent in rank to the four assistant secretaries.

== History ==
The Office of the Assistant Secretary of the Navy was established in 1861, to provide a senior deputy to the Secretary. The assistant secretary was responsible for the Navy's civilian personnel, as well as for administration of shore facilities (such as naval bases and shipyards). Gustavus Fox was the first to hold the post, serving throughout the Civil War. The office was disestablished in 1869, during Reconstruction, but was reestablished by Congress on July 11, 1890. James R. Soley was the first to be appointed to the newly reestablished position.

The assistant secretary was the Navy's number-two civilian until 1940, when Congress established the position of Under Secretary of the Navy, who was given oversight of the assistant secretary's activities. James V. Forrestal, later Secretary of Defense, was the first to serve as Under Secretary; he held the post until 1944, when he became Secretary of the Navy.

During the 20th century, the responsibilities of the assistant secretary were divided among several officials. During the 1920s, for example, to reflect the increasing importance of naval aviation, Congress established the position of Assistant Secretary of the Navy for Air.

The office of Assistant Secretary of the Navy was disestablished a second time in 1954.

=== Officeholders ===
- U.S. president Theodore Roosevelt served as Assistant Secretary of the Navy from 1897 to 1898, during the William McKinley administration. His short tenure was due to resigning to organize and lead into combat the 1st United States Volunteer Cavalry during the Spanish–American War. He took the initiative to order Admiral George Dewey to sail to Manila where he sank the Spanish Pacific Fleet at the very outset of the war.
- U.S. president Franklin D. Roosevelt (FDR) served as Assistant Secretary of the Navy from 1913 until 1920, and helped to implement Navy policies during World War I.
- According to author Edward J. Renehan, Jr., no fewer than five members of the extended Roosevelt family served as Assistant Secretary of the Navy: Theodore Roosevelt, Franklin Roosevelt, Theodore Roosevelt Jr. who served from 1921 through 1924 under Harding and Coolidge, Theodore Douglas Robinson (a son of Corinne Roosevelt Robinson) who served from 1924 through 1929 under Coolidge, and finally Henry Latrobe Roosevelt, a descendant of Robert Fulton's old friend "Steamboat Nicholas" Roosevelt, who served from 1933 through 1936 under FDR.
- Ralph Austin Bard was Assistant Secretary (1941–1944) and then Under Secretary (1944–1945) during World War II.

== Assistant Secretaries of the Navy, 1861–1954 ==
| Picture | Name | Assumed office | Left office | President appointed by | Secretary served under |
|---|---|---|---|---|---|
| | Gustavus Fox | August 1, 1861 | November 26, 1866 | Abraham Lincoln | Gideon Welles |
| | William Faxon | June 1, 1866 | March 3, 1869 | Andrew Johnson | Gideon Welles, Adolph Edward Borie, George Maxwell Robeson, Richard Wigginton Thompson, Nathan Goff, Jr., William Henry Hunt, William Eaton Chandler, William Collins Whitney |
| | James R. Soley | July 18, 1890 | March 19, 1893 | Benjamin Harrison | Benjamin Franklin Tracy |
| | William McAdoo | March 20, 1893 | April 18, 1897 | Grover Cleveland | Hilary Abner Herbert |
| | Theodore Roosevelt | April 19, 1897 | May 10, 1898 | William McKinley | John Davis Long |
| | Charles Herbert Allen | May 11, 1898 | April 21, 1900 | William McKinley | John Davis Long |
| | Frank W. Hackett | April 24, 1900 | December 16, 1901 | William McKinley | John Davis Long |
| | Charles Hial Darling | December 17, 1901 | October 30, 1905 | Theodore Roosevelt | John Davis Long, William Henry Moody, Paul Morton, Charles Joseph Bonaparte |
| | Truman Handy Newberry | November 1, 1905 | November 30, 1908 | Theodore Roosevelt | Charles Joseph Bonaparte, Victor Howard Metcalf |
| | Herbert L. Satterlee | December 3, 1908 | March 5, 1909 | Theodore Roosevelt | Truman Handy Newberry |
| | Beekman Winthrop | March 6, 1909 | March 16, 1913 | William Howard Taft | George von Lengerke Meyer |
| | Franklin D. Roosevelt | March 17, 1913 | August 26, 1920 | Woodrow Wilson | Josephus Daniels |
| | Gordon Woodbury | August 27, 1920 | March 9, 1921 | Woodrow Wilson | Josephus Daniels |
| | Theodore Roosevelt Jr. | March 10, 1921 | September 30, 1924 | Warren Harding | Edwin Denby |
| | Theodore Douglas Robinson | November 11, 1924 | March 4, 1929 | Calvin Coolidge | Curtis Dwight Wilbur |
| | Ernest L. Jahncke | April 1, 1929 | March 17, 1933 | Herbert Hoover | Charles Francis Adams III |
| | Henry L. Roosevelt | March 17, 1933 | February 22, 1936 | Franklin D. Roosevelt | Claude Augustus Swanson |
| | Charles Edison | January 18, 1937 | January 1, 1940 | Franklin D. Roosevelt | Claude Augustus Swanson |
| | Lewis Compton | February 9, 1940 | January 10, 1941 | Franklin D. Roosevelt | Charles Edison |
| | Ralph Austin Bard | February 24, 1941 | June 24, 1944 | Franklin D. Roosevelt | William Franklin Knox |
| | H. Struve Hensel | January 30, 1945 | February 28, 1946 | Franklin D. Roosevelt Harry S. Truman | James Vincent Forrestal |
| | W. John Kenney | March 1, 1946 | September 19, 1947 | Harry S. Truman | James Vincent Forrestal |
| | Mark E. Andrews | January 21, 1948 | February 15, 1949 | Harry S. Truman | John L. Sullivan |
| | John T. Koehler | February 18, 1949 | October 3, 1951 | Harry S. Truman | Francis P. Matthews |
| | Herbert R. Askins | October 3, 1951 | January 20, 1953 | Harry S. Truman | Dan A. Kimball |
| | Raymond H. Fogler | June 22, 1953 | October 4, 1954 | Dwight D. Eisenhower | Robert B. Anderson, Charles S. Thomas |

== Defunct offices bearing the title of "Assistant Secretary of the Navy" ==
| Office name | Year created | Year abolished |
|---|---|---|
| Assistant Secretary of the Navy (AIR) | 1926 | 1959 |
| Assistant Secretary of the Navy (Installations and Logistics) | c. 1960s? | c. 1970s? |
| Assistant Secretary of the Navy (Material) | c. 1950s? | c. 1950s? |
| Assistant Secretary of the Navy (Research and Development) | 1959 | 1977 |
| Assistant Secretary of the Navy (Research, Engineering and Systems) | 1977 | 1990 |
| Assistant Secretary of the Navy (Shipbuilding and Logistics) | | 1990 |
