= George A. Converse =

United States Navy admiral (1844–1909)

George Albert Converse
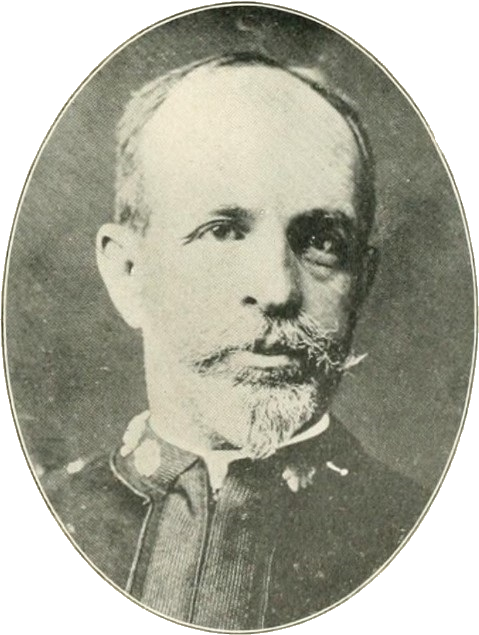
- George A. Converse
- Born: 13 May 1844; Norwich, Vermont, U.S.
- Died: 29 March 1909 (aged 64); Washington, D.C., U.S.
- Burial place: Arlington National Cemetery
- Relatives: Laura Shelby Converse (wife)
- Military career
- Allegiance: United States of America
- Branch: United States Navy
- Service years: 1861–1906
- Rank: Rear Admiral
- Commands: USS Enterprise; USS Montgomery; USS Illinois; Chief of the Bureaus of Equipment, Ordnance, and Navigation
- Conflicts: Spanish–American War

George Albert Converse (13 May 1844 – 29 March 1909) was a rear admiral in the United States Navy, who was noted for his contributions to naval engineering. He saw service in the Spanish–American War.

== Early life and education ==
Converse was born in Norwich, Vermont, the son of Shubael Converse, a physician and member of the Norwich University board of trustees. The younger Converse attended Norwich University from 1859 to 1861 and was a member of Theta Chi fraternity. He then entered the United States Naval Academy, graduating in 1865. In 1865, Converse also received a B.S. degree in the Norwich Class of 1863.

== Military career ==
Converse was appointed midshipman on 29 September 1861. His training cruises occurred aboard Union Navy warships during the American Civil War. He was a pioneer in the use of electricity on board men-of-war, in experimentation with and introduction of smokeless powder in the Navy, and in development of torpedo boats.

Converse was promoted to commander in March 1889 and served as the commanding officer of the sloop-of-war USS Enterprise from July 1890 to July 1891. In command of the cruiser USS Montgomery (C-9) from 1897 to 1899, he took an active part in operations off the coast of Cuba with Admiral William T. Sampson's squadron during the Spanish–American War. Converse was promoted to captain in March 1899 and served as commanding officer of the battleship USS Illinois (BB-7) from her commissioning in September 1901 to October 1903.

From 1903 to 1906, he served successively as Chief of the Bureaus of Equipment, Ordnance, and Navigation, continuing as Chief of the latter Bureau for a year after his retirement in May 1906. Converse was promoted to rear admiral in November 1904. From May 1907 to March 1909, he served as president of the Board of Construction. He died in Washington, D.C., 29 March 1909. Converse and his wife Laura Shelby Blood (1851–1934) are buried at Arlington National Cemetery in Section #2 Plot #967. They had five daughters, but one died as a toddler.

== Namesake ==
Two destroyers have been named USS Converse in his honor.
