= United States Marine Corps Judge Advocate Division =

Legal unit of the United States Marine Corps

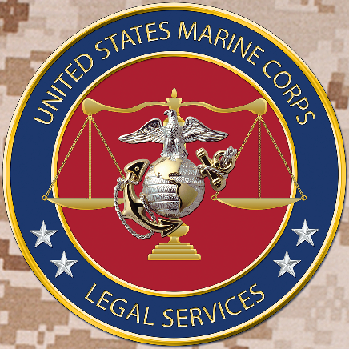

The United States Marine Corps' Judge Advocate Division serves both to advise the Commandant of the Marine Corps (CMC) and other officials in Headquarters, Marine Corps on legal matters, and to oversee the Marine Corps legal community. The head of the Judge Advocate Division (JAD) is the Staff Judge Advocate to the Commandant (SJA to CMC).

Judge advocates (JAs) in the Marine Corps work under the supervision of the SJA to the CMC to advise Marine commanders regarding legal issues including the laws of war, and handling of criminal cases under the Uniform Code of Military Justice (UCMJ). Marine Corps lawyers are line officers, unlike their counterparts in the United States Navy and Army, which means they can fill any officer billet in the Fleet Marine Force.

== Organization ==
The SJA to CMC has three deputies. One serves as Deputy SJA and Deputy Director of JAD for HQMC Legal Support. Another serves as Deputy Director of JAD for Military Justice and Community Development. The third serves as Deputy Director of JAD for Reserve Legal Support. JAD is divided into seven branches that fall under two of the three deputies:

- Deputy SJA and Deputy Director, JAD, HQMC Legal Support
  - JAA – Administrative Support: manages the internal administrative requirements of JAD
  - JCA – Civil and Administrative Law: legal review and guidance on civil and most administrative law matters, including professional responsibility
  - JPL – Military Personnel Law: full range of military personnel law matters
  - JAO – International and Operational Law: full range of international and operational law matters
- Deputy Director, JAD, Military Justice and Community Development
  - JMJ – Military Law: advice on military justice policy and legislation, and advising and assisting trial counsel in the field
  - JCD – Community Development, Strategy, and Plans: long-term strategic planning, writing and managing legal community doctrine, strategic communications, coordination of judge advocate manpower requirements and assignments, and overall coordination of IT support for legal community
  - JLA – Legal Assistance: administers Marine Corps legal assistance program under 10 U.S.C. § 1044
- Deputy Director, JAD, Reserve Legal Support – oversees the provision of Reserve legal support to the Marine Corps and heads the JAD Individual Mobilization Augmentee (IMA) Detachment

The SJA to CMC also exercises functional supervision over two independent legal organizations within the Marine Corps:

- DSO – Defense Services Organization: headed by the Chief Defense Counsel of the Marine Corps, the DSO provides defense counsel services to Marines worldwide
- VLCO – Victims' Legal Counsel Organization: headed by the Officer in Charge, the VLCO provides certain legal services to eligible victims of crime

== Staff Judge Advocates to the Commandant ==
The list of SJAs to the CMC includes:

- Colonel Charles B. Sevier; 1966–1968
- Colonel Marion G. Truesdale; 1968–1969
- Brigadier General Duane L. Faw; 1969–1971
- Brigadier General Clyde R. Mann; 1971–1973
- Brigadier General John R. De Barr; 1973–1976
- Brigadier General Robert J. Chadwick; 1976–1978
- Brigadier General James P. King; 1978–1980
- Brigadier General William H. J. Tiernan; 1980–1983
- Brigadier General Walter J. Donovan; 1983–1985
- Brigadier General David M. Brahms; 1985–1988
- Brigadier General Michael E. Rich; 1988–1990
- Brigadier General Gerald L. Miller; 1990–1993
- Brigadier General Michael C. Wholley; 1993–1996
- Brigadier General Theodore G. Hess; 1996–1999
- Brigadier General Joseph Composto; 1999–2001
- Brigadier General Kevin M. Sandkuhler; 2001–2006
- Brigadier General James C. Walker; 2006–2009
- Major General Vaughn Ary; 2009–2014
- Major General John R. Ewers; 2014–2018
- Major General Daniel J. Lecce; 2018–2021
- Major General David J. Bligh; 2021–2025
- Major General Christopher Tolar; 2025–present

== Marine Corps judge advocates ==
Marine Corps judge advocates, or JAs, are licensed attorneys who are also commissioned officers in the Marine Corps. Each JA goes through the same initial training as any other Marine officer.

A Marine officer with a Juris Doctor degree attends Naval Justice School. The officer is instructed in the fundamental principles of military justice, civil and administrative law, and legal assistance, with practical application of those principles, in order to assist in the attainment of good order and discipline and a high standard of legal practice and administration. Upon graduation from the school, the Marine is designated as a judge advocate (MOS 4402) and will begin his tour in the Fleet Marine Force as an attorney.

Judge advocates provide legal advice and support to commanders, Marines, sailors, and their families to promote the readiness of the force and contribute to Marine Corps mission accomplishment.

Unlike their Navy counterparts who are staff corps officers, Marine JAs are line officers and often serve in non-legal assignments, including command of battalions across the Marine Corps.

=== Prerequisites ===
The 4402 MOS is assigned as a primary MOS to an officer who has:

1. Obtained a Juris Doctor from an American Bar Association-accredited law school; completed The Basic School at Quantico, VA; completed the Basic Lawyer Course at the Naval Justice School, Newport, RI; and is a member in good standing of a federal bar, or of the highest court of a State or the District of Columbia; and
2. Been certified by the Judge Advocate General of the Navy in accordance with Article 27(b) of the Uniform Code of Military Justice to serve as a trial or defense counsel in courts-martial.

=== Career progression ===
As company grade officers, judge advocates ordinarily serve as litigators, legal assistance attorneys, victims’ legal counsel, assistant review officers, or command legal advisors. Litigation opportunities exist as trial, defense, and victims’ legal counsel in courts-martial; as Special Assistant United States Attorneys in United States federal court; and as recorders, counsel for the respondent, or victims’ legal counsel in administrative discharge boards. Judge Advocates either conduct or supervise investigations into claims for and against the United States and other matters required by regulations. Judge advocates provide command legal advice on matters including military justice, administrative law, civil law, standards of conduct, ethics, operational law, and international law.

As majors, judge advocates may serve as Staff Judge Advocates or Deputy Staff Judge Advocates and provide command legal advice. Judge Advocate Majors may also serve as Senior Trial Counsel, Senior Defense Counsel, or Regional Victims’ Legal Counsel at either a Legal Services Support Section (LSSS) or a Legal Services Support Team (LSST).

Majors and lieutenant colonels may perform duties as a labor, procurement, or environmental law specialist at various area counsel offices.

Lieutenant colonels may also serve as Staff Judge Advocates, Deputy Staff Judge Advocates, Regional Trial Counsel, Regional Defense Counsel, or Officers-in-Charge of an LSST. Colonels may serve as Staff Judge Advocates or Officers-in-Charge of an LSSS.

All field grade judge advocates may serve as military judges after being screened by a judicial screening board. Professional military education and continuing legal education opportunities exist for all judge advocates.

=== Further education ===
Judge advocates have the opportunity to pursue advanced study in disciplines relevant to the mission of the Marine Corps. An NMOS may be given to field-grade judge advocates who fulfill certain requirements. Judge advocates who obtain the necessary Master of Laws degree (LL.M.) as a captain will not receive the additional MOS until promoted to the rank of major.

- MOS 4405 – Master of International Law (NMOS) – LtCol-Maj
  - Judge advocates with an LL.M. in international law serve in challenging billets requiring an understanding of complex international and operational law issues. Officers may serve as Staff Judge Advocates or Deputy Staff Judge Advocates for service or joint commands.
  - Must hold an LL.M. in National Security or International Law from an American Bar Association (ABA)-accredited program at a civilian institution or have completed a specialty program in International and Operational Law from the graduate course at The Judge Advocate General's Legal Center and School, U.S. Army.
- MOS 4406 – Master of Environmental Law (NMOS) – LtCol-Maj
  - Judge Advocates with an LL.M. in Environmental or Land Use Law serve in challenging billets requiring an understanding of complex statutory and regulatory environmental and land use issues. Majors and lieutenant colonels may serve as deputy counsel in an area counsel office or for the counsel to the Commandant of the Marine Corps.
  - Must hold an LL.M. in Environmental or Land Use Law from an ABA-accredited program at a civilian institution.
- MOS 4407 – Master of Labor Law (NMOS) – LtCol-Maj
  - Judge advocates with an LL.M. in Labor Law serve in challenging billets requiring an understanding of complex statutory and regulatory civilian personnel law issues. As majors and lieutenant colonels they may serve as deputy counsel in an area counsel office or for the Counsel to the Commandant of the Marine Corps.
  - Must hold an LL.M. in Labor or Civilian Personnel Law from an ABA-accredited program at a civilian institution.
- MOS 4408 – Master of Procurement Law (NMOS) – Maj
  - Judge advocates with an LL.M. in Procurement Law provide the Marine Corps with an understanding of complex fiscal and contracting issues. Officers may serve in Marine Corps Systems Command, area counsel offices, or augment special staffs in an expeditionary environment.
  - Must hold an LL.M. in Procurement Law from an ABA-accredited program at a civilian institution or have completed a specialty program in Contract and Fiscal Law from the graduate course at The Judge Advocate General's Legal Center and School, U.S. Army.
- MOS 4409 – Master of Criminal Law (NMOS) – Col-Maj
  - Judge advocates with an LL.M. in Criminal Law serve in challenging billets requiring expertise in military and criminal law issues. As majors, they may serve as Senior Trial Counsel, Senior Defense Counsel, Regional Victims’ Legal Counsel, or Complex Trial Counsel. Lieutenant colonels with this specialty may be assigned as Regional Trial Counsel or Regional Defense Counsel.
  - Must hold an LL.M. in Criminal Law from an ABA-accredited program at a civilian institution or have completed a specialty program in Criminal Law from the graduate course at The Judge Advocate General's Legal Center and School, U.S. Army.
- MOS 4410 – Master of Law (General) (NMOS) – LtCol-Maj
  - Judge advocates with an LL.M. in administrative and civil law or general studies serve in a wide variety of billets throughout the Marine Corps. As majors they provide Senior Judge Advocates with a highly skilled officer prepared for duty as a Deputy Staff Judge Advocate or within any section of an office involved in the practice of law.
  - Must hold an LL.M. from either the general studies program or have completed a specialty program in Administrative and Civil Law from the graduate course at The Judge Advocate General's Legal Center and School, U.S. Army.

== See also ==
- General Counsel of the Navy
- Judge Advocate General of the Navy
- Military law
- Law of war
- JAG (TV series)
