= John Ewers =

John Ewers may refer to:

- John C. Ewers (1909–1997), American ethnologist and museum curator
- John K. Ewers (1904–1978), Australian writer
- John R. Ewers, United States Marine Corps general
