= Harold Gross =

Harold Gross may refer to:

- H. R. Gross (1899–1987), member of the United States House of Representatives from Iowa 1949–1975
- Harold B. Gross, lawyer, General Counsel of the Navy 1949–1953
- Harold Gross (Rhode Island), Lieutenant Governor of Rhode Island 1921–23
