= Michael C. Wholley =

United States Marine Corps general

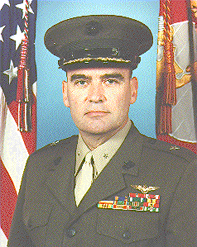
- Wholley in the 1990s
- Born: October 7, 1944 (age 81)
- Allegiance: United States
- Branch: United States Marine Corps
- Service years: 1966–1996
- Rank: Brigadier general
- Commands: USMC Judge Advocate Division
- Conflicts: Vietnam War
- Awards: Bronze Star
- Other work: General Counsel for NASA

Michael C. Wholley (born October 7, 1944) is a former General Counsel for NASA and a retired United States Marine Corps Brigadier General.

== Early life and education ==
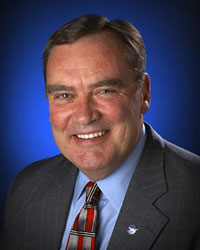
Wholley as NASA General Counsel

Wholley was born on October 7, 1944, in Lawrence, Massachusetts, attending Central Catholic High School. Wholley was commissioned through the Naval Reserve Officer Training Corps program at Harvard University after receiving his B.A. degree in History and Literature in 1966. He holds a J.D. degree from the University of Virginia Law School in 1977; an LL.M degree from George Washington University in Environmental Law and Land Use in 1985; and a master's degree in National Security and Strategic Studies from the Naval War College in 1989.

== Career ==
After being commissioned, Wholley attended The Basic School and completed training to become a United States Naval Aviator in 1968. Trained in the F-4 Phantom II, he flew combat missions in the Vietnam War with VMFA-115 and VMFA-542 from February 1969 to February 1970, and was promoted to captain in July. Upon returning to the United States, he was assigned to VMFA-251 at Marine Corps Air Station Beaufort as a pilot, and later, and as the legal officer to Marine Aircraft Groups 31 and 32. In January 1972, he was ordered to duty with the Royal Air Force at RAF Coningsby as an F-4 fighter weapons instructor. At the completion of this tour, he was allowed to attend law school at the University of Virginia, where he received his law degree in 1977.

After completing Naval Justice School, he was assigned to the 2nd Marine Division at Camp Lejeune, where he served as a defense counsel, trial counsel, chief trial counsel, military justice officer, review officer, and deputy staff judge advocate. In December 1979, he was reassigned as the Staff Secretary and served in that position until being transferred to Okinawa as a military judge in July 1981. From 1982 to 1984, he served in the Office of the Judge Advocate General of the Navy as an advisory attorney. In 1984, he was selected for the Special Education Program and attended the George Washington University Law School where he received a Master of Law Degree, with highest honors, in land use management and control (environmental law).

In July 1985, Wholley was assigned to Marine Corps Air Station Cherry Point as the Staff Judge Advocate. He was reassigned in July 1987 as the Staff Judge Advocate and Director of Legal Services for 2nd Marine Aircraft Wing. He was promoted to colonel in July 1988 and subsequently attended the Naval War College, Newport, Rhode Island, graduating in June 1989. He was then assigned as Staff Judge Advocate for Marine Corps Combat Development Command at Marine Corps Base Quantico from July 1989 until July 1992. He was then assigned as the Chief Judge, Navy-Marine Corps Trial Judiciary at Washington, D.C. On April 15, 1993, he was nominated for promotion to brigadier general and assignment as the Staff Judge Advocate to the Commandant of the Marine Corps and Director of the Judge Advocate Division, assuming the billet on September 29, promoted on October 7.

=== Post-military ===
After retiring from the military in 1996, he served as executive director of the Marine Corps Scholarship Foundation. Wholley later was appointed as the General Counsel for NASA. He served in this position from June 2004 to June 2014.

== Awards ==
Wholley was awarded:

Naval Aviator Badge
	Bronze Star		
Meritorious Service Medal w/ 2 award stars	Air Medal	Navy and Marine Corps Commendation Medal	Combat Action Ribbon
Navy Presidential Unit Citation	Navy Unit Commendation	Navy Meritorious Unit Commendation	National Defense Service Medal w/ 1 service star
Vietnam Service Medal w/ 2 service stars	Vietnam Gallantry Cross unit citation	Vietnam Civil Actions unit citation	Vietnam Campaign Medal

Wholley was also awarded the Legion of Merit.
