= Paul L. Oostburg Sanz =

American lawyer and judge

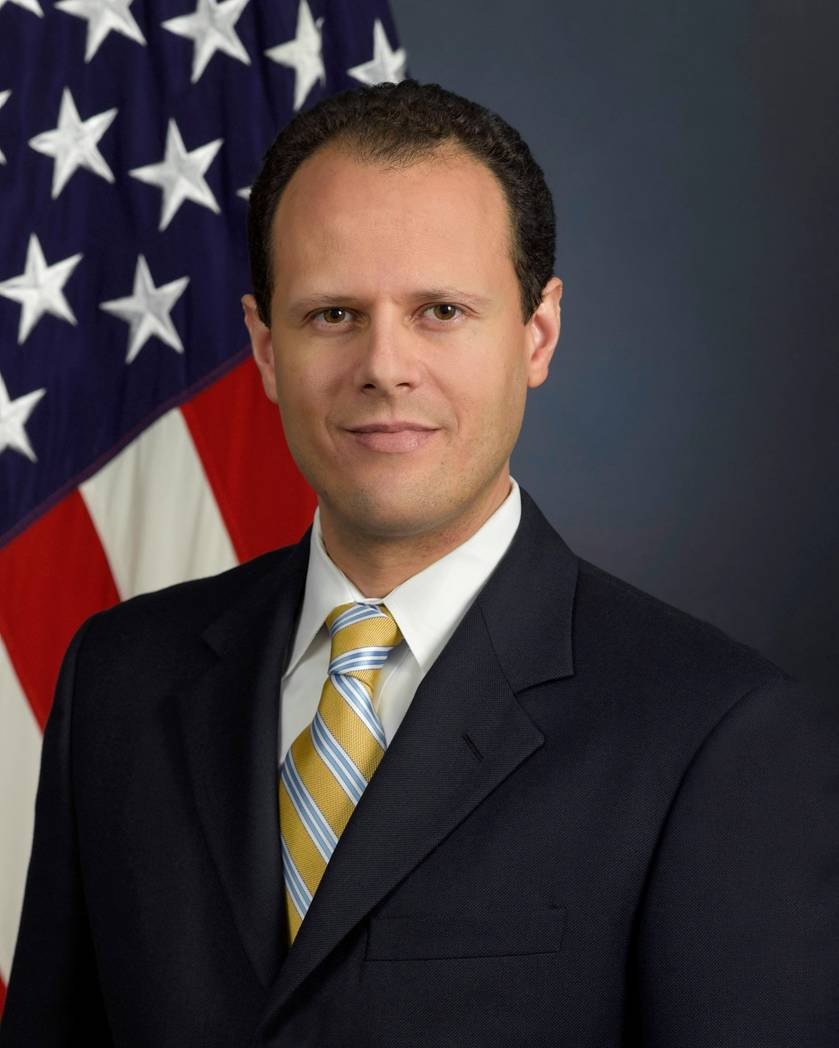

General Counsel of the United States Department of the Navy
- In office March 12, 2010 – January 20, 2017
- Preceded by: Frank Jimenez
- Succeeded by: Robert Sander

Personal details
- Born: October 21, 1969 (age 56) Aguadilla, Puerto Rico, U.S.
- Party: Democratic
- Education: Georgetown University (BA); Princeton University (MPA); Harvard Law School (JD)
- Profession: Attorney

Paul Luis Oostburg Sanz (born October 21, 1969) is the former United States General Counsel of the Navy, serving from 2010 to 2017.

== Biography ==
Paul L. Oostburg Sanz was born in Aguadilla, Puerto Rico in 1969. He received a Bachelor of Arts from the Edmund A. Walsh School of Foreign Service at Georgetown University, a Master of Public Administration from the Woodrow Wilson School of Public and International Affairs at Princeton University, and a Juris Doctor from Harvard Law School. After law school, he clerked for Judge José A. Fusté of the United States District Court for the District of Puerto Rico.

He conducted political party training in South Africa during the 1994 South African election, as a Project Officer for the Joint Center for Political and Economic Studies; and served as a Peace Corps Volunteer in Guinea-Bissau. He has also worked as a Graduate Fellow for the United States Agency for International Development in Mozambique and the United States Department of State in Liberia.

Oostburg Sanz then joined the staff of the United States House Committee on Foreign Affairs as the Democratic Deputy Chief Counsel. In this position, he provided legal expertise to the committee's Ranking Member on legislation and issues related to the Western Hemisphere, foreign assistance, and non-military security assistance. In January 2007, he became General Counsel of the United States House Committee on Armed Services. In this capacity, he was largely responsible for the drafting of the Military Commissions Act of 2009.

In 2010, President of the United States Barack Obama nominated Oostburg Sanz as General Counsel of the Navy, and Oostburg Sanz entered office on March 12, 2010.

On March 24, 2013, when Admiral Bruce MacDonald's three-year term as Guantanamo Convening Authority expired Sanz was appointed to serve as the fourth Convening Authority—on an interim basis. He was again named interim convening authority for military commissions on March 18, 2015, upon the announcement of the resignation of Vaughn Ary from that position.

Among the awards received are the Navy Distinguished Public Service Award (Jan 2017), (Aug 2013) and the Secretary of Defense Medal for Outstanding Public Service (Sep 2015).

In 2018, he was named general counsel for the Johns Hopkins Applied Physics Laboratory, a role in which he oversees the Lab's Office of Technology Transfer and serves as strategic advisor to the APL director for commercialization, which he still holds today.

Government offices
Preceded by Frank Jimenez; Anne M. Brennan (acting)	General Counsel of the Navy; March 12, 2010 – January 19, 2017	Succeeded by Anne M. Brennan (acting)
