= Philip A. Holloway =

American attorney and legal analyst

- Born: Philip Andrew Holloway
- Education: Valdosta State University (BCJ); South Texas College of Law (JD)
- Occupations: Attorney, legal analyst
- Years active: 1996 –
- Known for: Criminal defense law; legal analyst on Fox News, CourtTV, SiriusXM, CNN, HLN, MSNBC, and NBC

Philip Andrew Holloway is an American .

He has served as a legal analyst for CNN, HLN, MSNBC, and NBC. He is a criminal defense attorney with an office in the suburban Atlanta city of Marietta, Georgia.

== Education ==
Holloway earned a Bachelor of Science in Criminal Justice from Valdosta State University in 1992. He earned his Doctor of Jurisprudence from the South Texas College of Law, which he completed summa cum laude in 1996.

== Career ==
Holloway previously served as police instructor and certified flight instructor. He embarked on his legal career following his graduation from law school.

He started his legal career in U.S. Navy as an officer and judge advocate, graduating from the Naval Justice School's advanced trial advocacy course, earning certification as trial and defense counsel. He subsequently served as an assistant district attorney.

He is the founder of the Holloway Law Group and is admitted to practice law in Georgia, Ohio, various federal courts, and the U.S. Supreme Court. He has an AV Preeminent rating from his peers, the highest rating by Martindale-Hubbell.

=== Legal analysis and commentary ===
Holloway is a co-host of Megyn Kelly's talk show and podcast "MK True Crime" including on YouTube and Megyn Kelly's SiriusXM channel.

Holloway is also the legal analyst for WSB Radio in Atlanta, GA, and has hosted and contributed to true-crime podcasts, including the podcast Sworn and Up and Vanished.

In his 2015 CNN article, Should 11-year-olds be charged with adult crimes?, he argues against trying juveniles as adults, highlighting the risks associated with placing them in adult prisons and suggesting alternative approaches for handling juvenile offenders and emphasizes the need for rehabilitation and alternative programs to address the underlying issues and provide a chance for young offenders to reform.

In the aftermath of the Murders of Alison Parker and Adam Ward on live TV in Virginia in 2015, Holloway has argued that employers and HR personnel need to recognize they are “putting lives at risk” when they fail to warn subsequent employers about the dangerous behavior of their former employees.

Holloway commented in Fox News on the investigation into former President Donald Trump’s alleged affair, comparing it to former senator John Edwards case, where he used around $1 million to hide his mistress during his presidential campaign, remarking that the public saw the Edwards investigation as political efforts to weaponize the justice system and could perceive the same in the case against Trump.

Following Trump's prosecution in 2023, Holloway criticized Manhattan District Attorney Alvin Bragg, stating that there is nothing illegal about such arrangements or being a philanderer and that these things happen regularly. His analysis focused on Bragg's actions and decisions, prompting a range of opinions from legal professionals.

Following the New Years 2025 attack on a crowd in New Orleans, Holloway erroneously posted on X (Twitter) the attacker was a terrorist who had entered the country illegally. Holloway posted, without citing a source, "We are just learning the attacker came into the US at the Eagle Pass border crossing just TWO days ago. This was clearly planned; Joe is letting terrorists in still." Later the same day, Associated Press clarified the attacker, while apparently having ties to ISIS, was an American citizen and former military veteran from Texas who was already in the country.
