= Lamade =

Lamade is a surname. Notable people with the surname include:

- Bianka Lamade (born 1982), German tennis player
- Dietrick Lamade, German-born founder of American newspaper Grit
- Lawrence L. Lamade (born 1947), American lawyer

== See also ==
- Howard J. Lamade Stadium, in South Williamsport, Pennsylvania, named after a son of Dietrick Lamade
