= Coleman Hicks =

American lawyer; General Counsel of the Navy

Personal details
- Born: April 26, 1943 Columbus, Ohio, U.S.
- Died: August 3, 2004 (aged 61)
- Children: 2

Military service
- Allegiance: United States
- Years of service: 1969-1972

Coleman Hicks (26 April 1943 – 3 August 2004) was a United States lawyer who served as General Counsel of the Navy from 1979 to 1981.

== Biography ==
Coleman Hicks was born in Columbus, Ohio, and raised in Mason City, Iowa. Hicks was educated at Princeton University, receiving his B.A. in 1965. Bill Bradley, whom Hicks had met at a conference of high school students involved with student government, was one of Hicks' roommates at Princeton. After Princeton, Hicks enrolled at Yale Law School, graduating in 1968.

In 1969, Hicks joined the Judge Advocate General's Corps, U.S. Navy. In summer 1971, he was posted as an instructor at the Naval Justice School in Newport, Rhode Island, but he left this position after only a few weeks when he became personal assistant to National Security Advisor Henry Kissinger. (He was recommended by Kissinger's previous personal assistant, David Halperin, who was a friend of Hicks' from the Navy.)

In June 1972, a week before the second of the Watergate burglaries, Hicks left his post as Kissinger's personal assistant to join the law firm of Covington & Burling. There, he was a general litigator and participated in a wide variety of cases.

In 1979, President of the United States Jimmy Carter nominated Hicks as General Counsel of the Navy and, after Senate confirmation, Hicks held this office from May 25, 1979, until January 13, 1981.

After leaving government service in 1981, Hicks returned to Covington & Burling, where he practiced law for the next fourteen years. One of the highlights of his legal career came in 1987, when he wrote the winning brief in the case of Hazelwood v. Kuhlmeier (484 U.S. 260 (1988)).

== Death ==
In 1995, at the start of the dot-com bubble, Hicks left Covington & Burling, relocating to Waltham, Massachusetts, and joining Oak Industries, a company headed by a friend from the Navy Office of General Counsel, William Antle III, that provided broadband networks, frequency control devices and fiber-optic components to the telecommunications industry. He served as Oak Industries' General Counsel, and later as Chief Financial Officer. Oak Industries was acquired by Corning Industries in 2000.

Hicks was diagnosed with cancer in 2000. He died from complications of cancer and a stroke on August 3, 2004, at his home in Boston. He was 61 years old.

Government offices
Preceded by Togo D. West, Jr.	General Counsel of the Navy; May 25, 1979 – January 13, 1981	Succeeded by Walter T. Skallerup, Jr.
