= J. Henry Neale =

American lawyer and banker (1904–1989)

- Born: July 25, 1904; New York, New York, U.S.
- Died: February 6, 1989 (aged 84); White Plains, New York, U.S.
- Education: Amherst College and Harvard Law School
- Occupations: Lawyer, banker
- Known for: Being General Counsel of the Navy between 1945 - 1946
- Awards: Legion of Merit

J. Henry Neale (July 25, 1904 in New York, New York – February 6, 1989 in White Plains, New York) was a United States lawyer and banker.

== Biography ==
J. Henry Neale was educated at Amherst College and Harvard Law School.

In 1945, President of the United States Harry Truman named Neale General Counsel of the Navy, a post Neale held from November 1, 1945 until July 26, 1946. Neale was awarded the Legion of Merit for his work as General Counsel of the Navy.

In 1946, Neale took a job with the Scarsdale National Bank and Trust Company in Scarsdale, New York. He remained affiliated with the Scarsdale National Bank and Trust Company for the next thirty years, eventually serving as its president and later chairman. He was president of the Westchester County Bankers Association from 1949 to 1952; as president of the Westchester County Bar Association from 1953 to 1955; as president of the State Bankers Association from 1959 to 1960; and as president of the New York State Bar Association from 1967 to 1968.

Neale died of a stroke at the White Plains Hospital on February 6, 1989. He was 84 years old.

Government offices
Preceded by Patrick H. Hodgson	General Counsel of the Navy; November 1, 1945 – July 26, 1946	Succeeded by William Wemple
