= William Wemple (lawyer, born 1912) =

American lawyer

William Wemple (November 3, 1912 – February 25, 2002) was an American lawyer.

== Biography ==
Wemple was born in New York City on November 3, 1912. He attended the Wardlaw School 1924-28, and then the Loomis School, graduating in 1930. He then attended Harvard College, receiving his A.B. in 1934. During his time in college, he was captain of the Harvard soccer team in 1933. He then enrolled in Columbia Law School and received his LL.B. in 1937. He was admitted to the bar of New York State in 1938.

In August 1937, Wemple joined the New York law firm of Cravath, Swaine & Moore. He worked there until April 1942.

During World War II, Wemple served in the United States Department of the Navy's Office of General Counsel (DON-OGC) beginning in April 1942. He began as Assistant Counsel of the Bureau of Aeronautics, then became Counsel of the Bureau. He was then promoted to Assistant General Counsel of the Navy, and finally, from July 27, 1946 to August 23, 1946, he was General Counsel of the Navy. During his time at DON-OGC, Wemple also served in the United States Navy Reserve, becoming a Lieutenant in January 1943 and then a Lieutenant Commander in September 1943. He was released from the Navy Reserve.

Upon leaving the Department of the Navy in 1946, Wemple became a partner at Root, Ballantine, Harlan, Bushby, & Palmer (the predecessor firm of Dewey Ballantine).

Government offices
| Preceded by J. Henry Neale | General Counsel of the Navy; July 27, 1946 – August 23, 1946 | Succeeded by James T. Hill, Jr. |
