= Walter T. Skallerup Jr. =

American lawyer

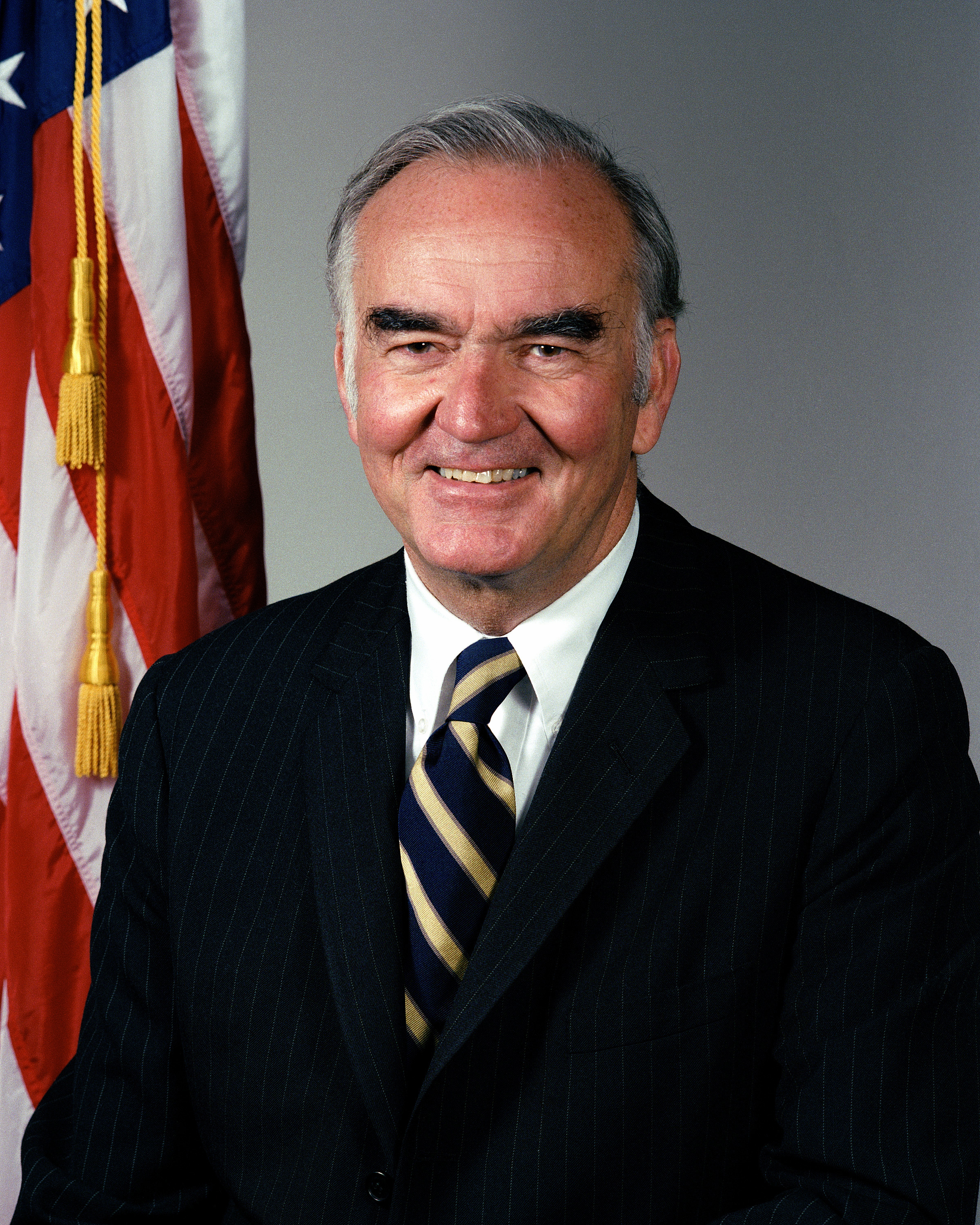
- Walter T. Skallerup Jr. in 1985

Personal details
- Born: Walter Thorwald Skallerup Jr. February 27, 1921 Chicago, Illinois, U.S.
- Died: July 29, 1987 (aged 66) Washington, D.C., U.S.
- Resting place: Oak Hill Cemetery; Washington, D.C., U.S.
- Party: Democrat

Walter T. Skallerup Jr. (1921-1987) was an American lawyer who served in various roles at the United States Department of Defense, most notably as General Counsel of the Navy from 1981 until his death in 1987.

== Biography ==
Walter T. Skallerup Jr. was born in Chicago, Illinois in 1921. He attended Swarthmore College, receiving his B.A. During World War II, Skallerup served in the United States Navy as an aviation support officer trained in radar systems. After the war, he enrolled at Yale Law School, receiving his LL.B. in 1947. After law school, Skallerup was involved in the private practice of law for a number of years.

Skallerup joined the United States Department of Defense in 1962, serving as Deputy Assistant Secretary of Defense for Security Policy under United States Secretary of Defense Robert McNamara. He held this office until 1967, when he returned to the private practice of law. From 1970 to 1971, he was a member of the Atomic Safety and Licensing Board, and in 1973–74, he was a consultant of the United States Congress Joint Committee on Atomic Energy.

In both 1972 and 1976, Skallerup was highly involved in the presidential campaigns of Henry M. Jackson, serving as treasurer of the Jackson for President Committee.

In 1981, President of the United States Ronald Reagan nominated Skallerup as General Counsel of the Navy and, after Senate Confirmation, he held this post from August 24, 1981 until his death on 1987.

Skallerup died on 1987 of cancer at the Georgetown University Hospital. He was buried at Oak Hill Cemetery in Washington, D.C.

Skallerup was heavily involved with his alma maters. The Walter T. Skallerup Jr. Track at Swarthmore College is named in his honor. He was a one-time chairman of the Yale Law School Fund and a scholarship at Yale Law School was created after his death.

Government offices
Preceded by Coleman Hicks	General Counsel of the Navy; August 24, 1981 – July 29, 1987	Succeeded by Harvey J. Wilcox (Deputy GC); Lawrence L. Lamade
