= Patrick H. Hodgson =

American lawyer

Patrick H. Hodgson was a United States lawyer who served as General Counsel of the Navy from April 3, 1945 through October 31, 1945.

Government offices
Preceded by W. John Kenney	General Counsel of the Navy; April 3, 1945 – October 31, 1945	Succeeded by J. Henry Neale
