= Anne M. Brennan =

American lawyer

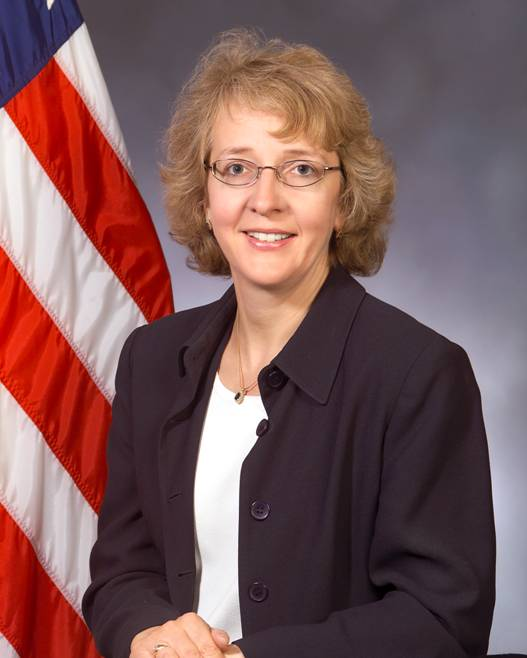

Acting General Counsel of the Navy
- In office January 20, 2017 – March 6, 2019
- Appointed by: Donald Trump
- Preceded by: Paul L. Oostburg Sanz
- Succeeded by: Garrett L. Ressing (acting)
- In office May 1, 2009 – March 11, 2010
- Appointed by: Barack Obama
- Preceded by: Frank Jimenez
- Succeeded by: Paul L. Oostburg Sanz

Personal details
- Education: Wellesley College (BA); Suffolk University Law School (JD)

Anne M. Brennan is a former acting United States General Counsel of the Navy. She served as an attorney with the U.S. Department of the Navy from 1986 to 2019. She retired in March 2019.

== Biography ==
Anne M. Brennan attended Wellesley College, receiving a B.A., and Suffolk University Law School, receiving a J.D.

In 1986, Brennan joined the United States Department of the Navy's Office of General Counsel (DON-OGC) in the Civilian Personnel Law Section of the Office of the Counsel of the Naval Sea Systems Command (NAVSEA). She was later detailed to the Office of the United States Attorney for the District of Columbia, working as a Special Assistant United States Attorney in the Civil Division. When she returned to the Office of the Counsel of NAVSEA, she worked as a procurement attorney. In 1995, she became Counsel of the Office of Program Appraisal, and at the same time became Deputy General Counsel of the Navy. She returned to NAVSEA in 1997 as head of its Civilian Personnel Law Section; in 2000, she became head of the NAVSEA Systems Section. In 2003, she joined the Office of the Associate General Counsel for the Assistant Secretary of the Navy (Research, Development and Acquisitions). She became a member of the Senior Executive Service in 2004, at the same time becoming Deputy Counsel for NAVSEA. The next year, she became Assistant General Counsel (Financial Management & Comptroller), and in 2007, she became Counsel of NAVSEA.

On January 20, 2008, Brennan became Deputy General Counsel for the Department of the Navy. She became Principal Deputy General Counsel in August 2009.

From May 2009 to March 2010, Brennan served as Acting General Counsel of the Navy. She assumed this same role again in January 2017 and officially retired from that position in March 2019.

In February 2019, Brennan joined the Johns Hopkins Applied Physics Laboratory as the principal deputy general counsel, a role she still serves in today. While at APL, she was a 2019 recipient of the D.C. Bar's Beatrice Rosenberg Award, presented each year to a bar member whose career reflects the highest order of public service.

Government offices
Preceded by Frank Jimenez	General Counsel of the Navy (acting); May 1, 2009 – March 11, 2010	Succeeded by Paul L. Oostburg Sanz
Preceded by Paul L. Oostburg Sanz	General Counsel of the Navy (acting); January 20, 2017 – February 2019	Succeeded by Garrett L. Ressing (acting)
