= Frank Jimenez =

21st General Counsel of the U.S. Department of the Navy

Frank Ruben Jimenez
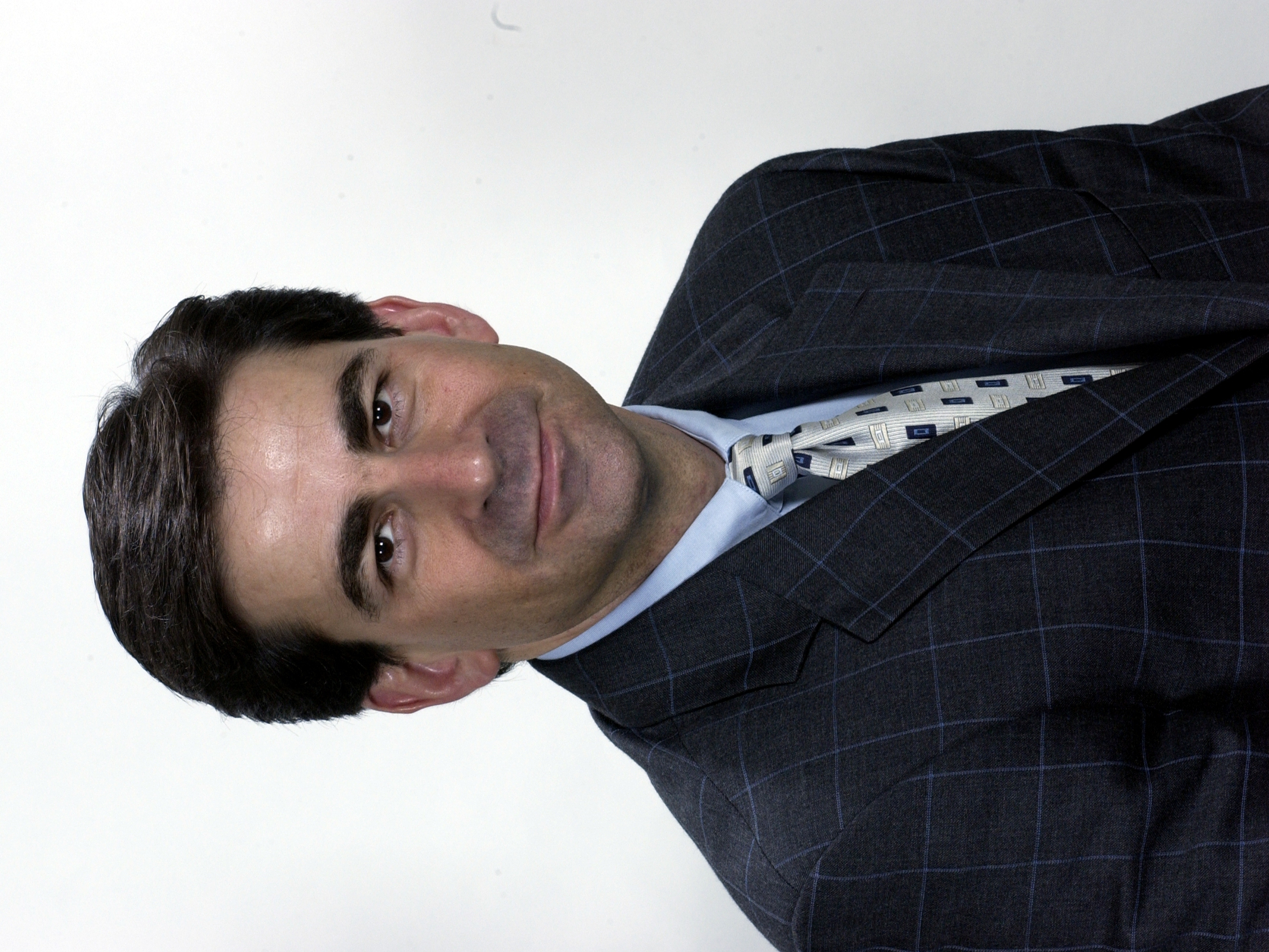

General Counsel of the Navy
- In office September 25, 2006 – April 30, 2009
- President: George W. Bush; Barack Obama
- Preceded by: Alberto J. Mora
- Succeeded by: Paul L. Oostburg Sanz

Personal details
- Born: November 8, 1964 (age 62) San Juan, Puerto Rico, U.S.
- Party: Republican
- Education: University of Miami (BS); Yale University (JD); University of Pennsylvania (MBA); Naval War College (MA)

Frank Ruben Jimenez (born November 8, 1964) became the 21st General Counsel of the U.S. Department of the Navy on September 25, 2006, following his nomination by George W. Bush and confirmation by the United States Senate. Jimenez served at the Navy after the change in administrations on January 20, 2009 until April 30, 2009 when he resigned to become Vice President and General Counsel at ITT Corporation.

As the General Counsel of the Navy, Jimenez managed over 600 attorneys worldwide, helped to oversee the Naval Criminal Investigative Service, and advised senior Navy and Marine Corps officials on litigation, acquisition, fiscal, environmental, property, personnel, legislative, and ethics issues.

== Early life and career ==
Jimenez, the son of Cuban immigrants Frank and Daisy Jimenez, grew up in Miami, Florida. He is the younger brother of Marcos Daniel Jimenez, former United States Attorney for the Southern District of Florida, in charge of 230 federal prosecutors. Jimenez graduated with honors in 1987 from the University of Miami, where he majored in biology. He received his Juris Doctor degree in 1991 from the Yale Law School, where he was Notes Editor of the Yale Law Journal and won the Harlan Fiske Stone and Benjamin N. Cardozo Prizes for best oral argument and best brief, respectively, in the school's moot court competition. He also received an MBA degree in 2005 from the Wharton School at the University of Pennsylvania and an M.A. degree in National Security and Strategic Studies in 2009 from the Naval War College.

Before his career in government, Jimenez practiced at the Miami law firm of Steel Hector and Davis LLP, specializing in complex commercial litigation and white collar criminal defense, including federal class action, antitrust and product liability litigation, and representation of clients under federal grand jury and agency investigation. He joined the firm in 1992 and became a partner in 1998. Previously, he served a one-year clerkship in the chambers of Judge Pamela Ann Rymer of the U.S. Court of Appeals for the Ninth Circuit in Pasadena, California. Jimenez is admitted to the Bars of Florida, the District of Columbia, and New York.

== Government work ==
Before his appointment as General Counsel of the Navy, Jimenez served in the Office of the Secretary of Defense (OSD) as the Deputy General Counsel (Legal Counsel) for the U.S. Department of Defense (DoD), the seniormost litigation counsel for the Department, coordinating with the White House Counsel's Office, Department of Justice and other agencies on pressing legal issues. He advised senior DoD officials on a wide variety of legal questions and supervised the Office of Legislative Counsel and the Defense Office of Hearings and Appeals. Prior to his service in the OSD, Jimenez was the Principal Deputy General Counsel of the Navy, the alter ego to the General Counsel of the Navy.

Before his 2004 arrival at the Pentagon, Jimenez served as the Chief of Staff at the U.S. Department of Housing and Urban Development (HUD). As Chief of Staff, he assisted Secretary Mel Martinez in managing more than 9,000 employees and an annual budget surpassing $30 billion. He helped supervise HUD's many homeownership and affordable housing programs for low-income Americans, as well as programs for the homeless, elderly, people with disabilities, and people living with AIDS. Jimenez also assisted in supervising the Department's interactions with the White House, sister agencies, public officials, industry groups and the general public.

Jimenez arrived in Washington in 2002 from Florida, where he served for nearly four years in the Executive Office of Governor Jeb Bush, beginning with his gubernatorial transition in 1998. For nearly three years, he served as Deputy Chief of Staff, with oversight duties at various times for the Departments of Transportation, Business and Professional Regulation, Environmental Protection, Community Affairs, Elder Affairs, and Health, as well as the Agency for Workforce Innovation and the Division of Emergency Management. Jimenez also served as Acting General Counsel and as Deputy General Counsel to the Governor.

== Post-government ==
Jimenez became Vice President and General Counsel of ITT Corporation in May 2009, replacing Vince Maffeo. In December 2008, he was added to a list of prospective Florida Supreme Court nominees. In 2011, following a 3-way breakup of ITT, Jimenez became Senior Vice President, General Counsel and Corporate Secretary of one of the ITT spinoffs, U.S. S&P 500 company Xylem Inc. In 2012, he became General Counsel, Secretary and Managing Director, Government Affairs at a Fortune Global 200 agribusiness and food company, Bunge Limited, based in New York. In 2015, he was named General Counsel and Corporate Secretary of Raytheon Company, a Fortune 150 company specializing in defense, civil government and cyber-security solutions. Upon the 2020 merger of equals between Raytheon and the aerospace businesses of United Technologies Corporation remaining after the latter’s spinoffs of Otis Worldwide Corporation and Carrier Global Corporation, Jimenez became Executive Vice President and General Counsel of the renamed Raytheon Technologies Corporation. In 2022, he joined GE Healthcare as General Counsel to help it spin off from General Electric as a separate public company in 2023. In 2022, he was also elected to the Board of Directors of Huntington Ingalls Industries, the largest military shipbuilding company in the United States.

== Notes ==
Government offices
Preceded by Alberto J. Mora; Paul C. Ney, Jr. (acting)	General Counsel of the Navy; September 25, 2006 – April 30, 2009	Succeeded by Anne M. Brennan (acting); Paul L. Oostburg Sanz
