= F. Trowbridge vom Baur =

American lawyer

Francis Trowbridge vom Baur (September 17, 1908, Riverton, New Jersey - June 17, 2000, Charlottesville, Virginia) was a United States lawyer who was General Counsel of the Navy from 1953 to 1960.

== Biography ==
F. Trowbridge vom Baur was born in Riverton, New Jersey, the son of Carl Hans vom Baur and Edith Venelia Trowbridge. He received a bachelor's degree from Amherst College in 1929 and a law degree from Harvard Law School in 1932.

After law school, vom Baur joined the New York City law firm of Milbank, Tweed & Hope as an associate attorney. In 1937, Milbank, Tweed sent vom Baur to Washington, D.C. to lobby against the Judicial Procedures Reform Bill of 1937.

Vom Baur left Milbank, Tweed in 1942, joining the staff of Nelson Rockefeller's Office of the Coordinator of Inter-American Affairs. There, he was responsible for administering public and sanitation assistance in Central America and the West Indies.

With the end of World War II, vom Baur left government service and formed a law firm, vom Baur, Coburn, Simmons & Turtle, in Washington, D.C. He would be a senior partner with this firm - and its successor, Gage, Tucker & vom Baur - until he retired in 1983.

In 1953, President of the United States Dwight D. Eisenhower nominated vom Baur as General Counsel of the Navy and vom Baur subsequently held this office from December 15, 1953 until April 30, 1960. In this capacity, vom Baur was instrumental in designing safeguards to protect United States Department of the Navy employees and military contractors who were accused of participating in subversive activities while the nation was in the grip of McCarthyism. At vom Baur's behest, the Department of the Navy set up evidentiary hearings for individuals accused of subversive activities; vom Baur also made arrangements with the American Bar Association to have pro bono legal representation for individuals accused of subversion. In most cases, accusations of subversion could not be substantiated and individuals were cleared of wrongdoing.

After leaving the Department of the Navy, vom Baur returned to legal practice until his retirement in 1983. From 1980 to 1990, he was General Counsel of the Naval Undersea Museum Foundation.

Vom Baur died at a convolescant home in Charlottesville, Virginia on June 17, 2000. He was 91 years old.

== Select Works by F. Trowbridge vom Baur ==
- F. Trowbridge vom Baur, Federal Administrative Law: A Treatise on the Legal Principles Governing the Validity of Action of Federal Administrative Agencies, and of State Agencies on Federal Questions (Chicago: Callaghan & Co., 1942)
- Ernest Schein & F. Trowbridge vom Baur, "Publicizing International Affairs," 47 AM. J. INT'L L. 482 (1953)
- F. Trowbridge vom Baur, "Administrative Agencies and Unauthorized Practice of Law", 48 A.B.A. J. 715 (1962)
- F. Trowbridge vom Baur, "How to Look up Law and Write Legal Memoranda Revisited", The Practical Lawyer, May 1965
- F. Trowbridge vom Baur, "Differences between Commercial Contracts and Government Contracts", 53 A.B.A. J. 247 (1967)
- F. Trowbridge vom Baur, "Revitalizing the Trial Bar," 55 A.B.A. J. 138 (1969)
- F. Trowbridge vom Baur, "Fifty Years of Government Contract Law," 29 Fed. B. J. 305 (1970)
- F. Trowbridge vom Baur, "The Art of Brief Writing" (1976) 22 The Practical Lawyer 81
- F. Trowbridge vom Baur, The Practical Lawyer's Manual on Legal Research, Writing and Indexing (Philadelphia: American Law Institute-American Bar Association Committee and Continuing Professional Education, 1979)
- F. Trowbridge vom Baur, "Early Days of Government Contract Practice", Public Contract Law Journal, March 1989, v. 18: 446-459.
- F. Trowbridge vom Baur, "A Personal History of the Model Procurement Code", 25 Pub. Cont. L.J. 149 (1996)

Government offices
Preceded by Harold B. Gross	General Counsel of the Navy; December 15, 1953 – April 30, 1960	Succeeded by Meritt H. Steger
