= Daniel Lecce =

Retired U.S. Marine Corps general

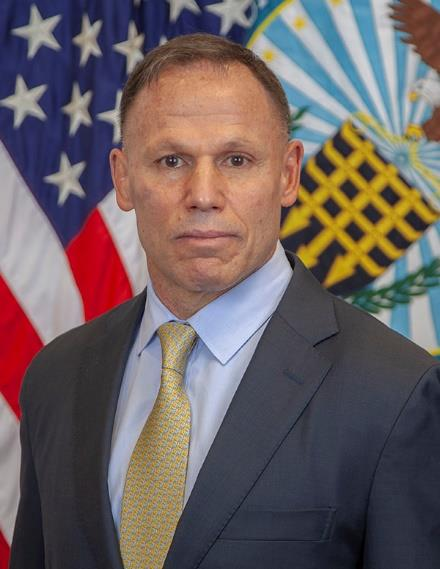
- Official portrait, 2022

Acting Director of the Defense Counterintelligence and Security Agency
- Incumbent
- Assumed office September 28, 2023
- President: Joe Biden

Personal details
- Born: Pittsburgh, Pennsylvania, U.S.

Military service
- Allegiance: United States
- Branch/service: United States Marine Corps
- Years of service: 1986–2021
- Rank: Major general
- Commands: Marine Corps Base Camp Lejeune
- Awards: Defense Superior Service Medal; Legion of Merit (2)

Daniel Joseph Lecce is an American government official. He is a retired United States Marine Corps major general and a former deputy director and acting director of the Defense Counterintelligence and Security Agency. As a Marine, Lecce was last the Staff Judge Advocate to the Commandant of the Marine Corps from July 2018 to August 2021. He was previously assigned as the Assistant Judge Advocate General for Military Justice of the United States Navy, senior legal adviser to U.S. Southern Command and general counsel for II Marine Expeditionary Force. His Marine Corps retirement ceremony was held on September 30, 2021.

Born and raised in Pittsburgh, Lecce graduated from the University of Pittsburgh in 1984. He was commissioned in 1986 and completed his J.D. degree at the University of Pittsburgh School of Law in 1987. He later earned an LL.M. degree in operational and international law from the Judge Advocate General of the U.S. Army School in 1997 and an M.A. degree in international public policy from the Paul H. Nitze School of Advanced International Studies at Johns Hopkins University in 2007.

Military offices
Preceded by Richard P. Flatau	Commanding Officer of the Marine Corps Base Camp Lejeune; 2010–2012	Succeeded by Andrew M. Niebel
Preceded by John R. Ewers	Assistant Judge Advocate General for Military Justice of the United States Navy; 2014–2018	Succeeded by David J. Bligh
Preceded by John R. Ewers	Staff Judge Advocate to the Commandant of the Marine Corps; 2018–2021	Succeeded by David J. Bligh
Government offices
Preceded by Christy K. Wilder; Acting; William D. Stephens; Acting	Deputy Director of the Defense Counterintelligence and Security Agency; 2022–present	Incumbent
