= Sean Coffey =

American Navy officer, lawyer and businessman

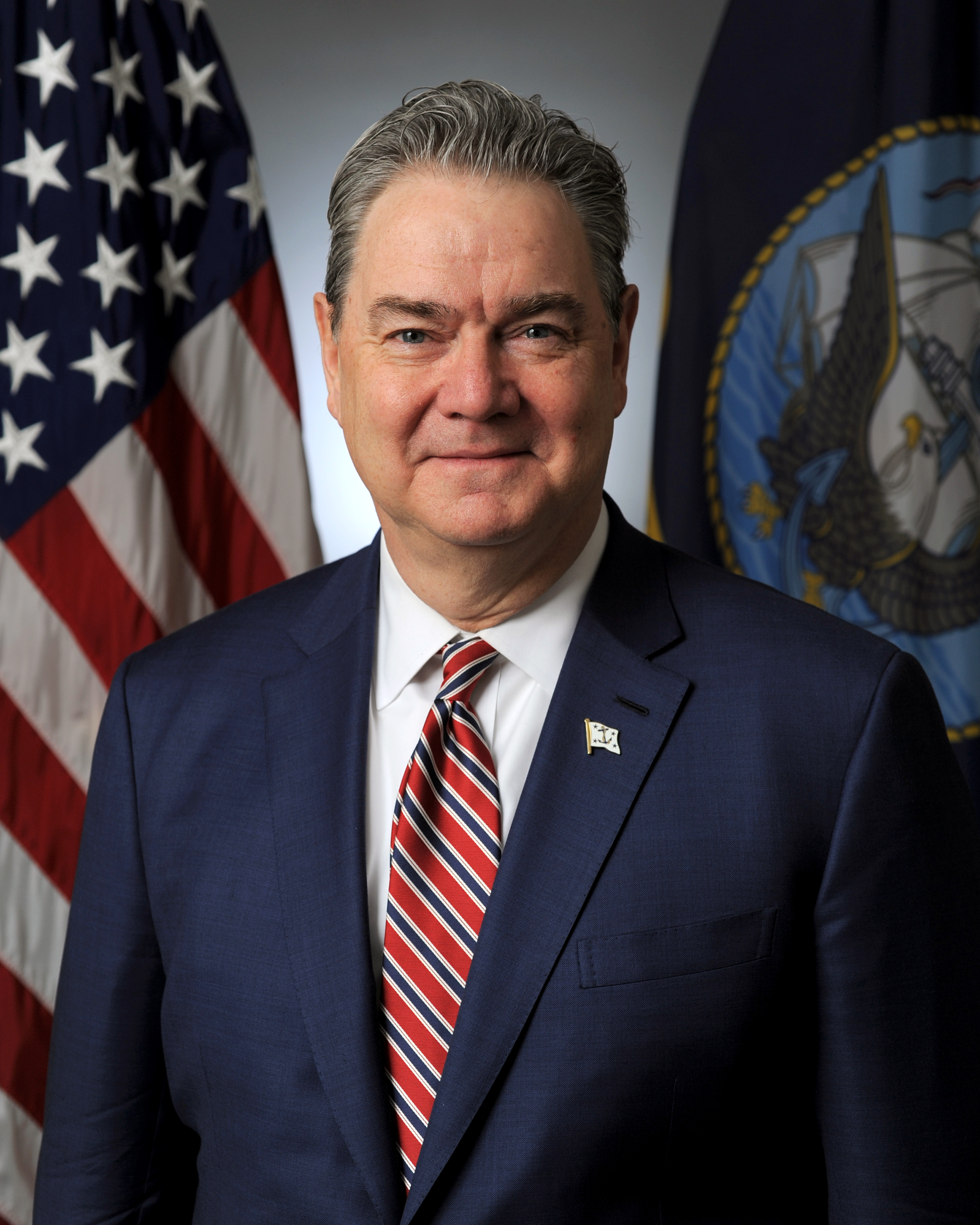

General Counsel of the Navy
- In office February 16, 2022 – January 20, 2025
- President: Joe Biden
- Secretary: Carlos Del Toro
- Preceded by: Robert Sander
- Succeeded by: David Denton Jr.

Personal details
- Born: John P. Coffey; 1956 (age 69–70) New York City, U.S.
- Education: United States Naval Academy (BS); Georgetown University (JD)

Military service
- Allegiance: United States
- Branch/service: United States Navy
- Years of service: 1978–2004
- Rank: Captain

John Patrick "Sean" Coffey is an American attorney, businessman, retired U.S. Navy captain, and political candidate who served as general counsel of the Navy from 2022 until early 2025. He led a lawsuit against WorldCom on behalf of investors. In the case, his team recovered over $6 billion from Wall Street banks and responsible parties paid millions of dollars in compensation.

In 2009, Coffey retired from his partnership at Bernstein Litowitz Berger & Grossmann to seek the Democratic nomination for New York attorney general; he finished third in a five-way primary. In 2011, Coffey co-founded BlackRobe Capital Partners, which closed one and a half years later.

As the General Counsel of the U.S. Department of the Navy and its chief legal officer Coffey led more than 1,100 attorneys and support staff in 140 offices worldwide. Further in this position, Coffey provided legal advice to the Secretary of the Navy, the Under Secretary of the Navy, the Assistant Secretaries of the Navy and their staffs, and the multiple components of the department, including the Navy and the Marine Corps.

He is now a mediator and arbitrator with Phillips Alternative Dispute Resolutions who teaches part-time at Georgetown Law and Harvard Law.

== Early life and education ==
Born in 1956 to Irish immigrant parents, Coffey is the oldest of seven children raised in the Bronx, Buffalo, and Nassau County, New York. His father John, from County Kerry, was a union carpenter and his mother Mary, from Courtmacsherry, County Cork, was a homemaker. He graduated from Chaminade High School in 1974 and won an appointment to the United States Naval Academy, taking the oath of office as a midshipman at age 17. Graduating from Annapolis with an ocean engineering degree in 1978, Coffey selected Naval Flight Officer training. He received his wings in September 1979.

Coffey served eight years on active duty in the U.S. Navy, from 1978 to 1986. He was assigned to a P-3C Orion maritime patrol squadron, conducting antisubmarine warfare missions against Soviet submarines in the North Atlantic, Western Pacific, and Mediterranean during the Cold War.

From 1983 to 1984 he served as a junior officer intern in the Strategy Division of the Joint Chiefs of Staff at the Pentagon. During this period he started attending law school in the evening.

In 1984 and 1985, Coffey served as the personal military assistant (“aide de camp”) to Vice President George H. W. Bush, traveling domestically and internationally as part of the vice president’s staff.

On active duty during the Cold War, he flew as a P-3C Orion mission commander tracking Soviet nuclear submarines.

Coffey attended Georgetown University Law Center at night, graduating in 1987.

While studying at Georgetown Law Coffey was the articles editor of The Georgetown Law Journal, won the Charles A. Keigwin Award (for the best overall academic record after the first year), and was invited to join the Order of the Coif.

After leaving active duty in 1986, Coffey joined the Navy Reserve, where he served for eighteen years. As a reservist, he participated in counter-narcotics operations in the Caribbean and armed missions connected to the NATO blockade of the former Yugoslavia. His reserve assignments included service in P-3 Orion squadrons and command of Patrol Squadron 92. He later commanded the reserve component of the USS Enterprise Carrier Battle Group staff. He also served in the Office of the Secretary of Defense (Reserve Affairs), contributing to reports and analyses concerning reserve force utilization during the conflicts in Afghanistan and Iraq.

Coffey retired from the Navy Reserve in 2004 with the rank of Captain.

== Career ==
After leaving active duty, he served in the U.S. Navy as a reservist. He retired from the Navy in 2004.

=== Early legal and political career ===
In 1987, after resigning from active naval duty, Coffey returned to New York as a litigation associate with Paul Weiss Rifkind Wharton & Garrison. He was appointed an Assistant U.S. Attorney in the Southern District of New York in 1991, and worked with federal, state, and local law enforcement agencies prosecuting a variety of crimes. He tried over a dozens felony jury trial to verdict. In 1995, Coffey joined the law firm of Latham & Watkins, where he defended major American and international businesses in litigation.

=== Tenures at Bernstein Litowitz Berger & Grossmann ===
Three years later Coffey left his partnership at Latham & Watkins to join the plaintiffs’ litigation firm of Bernstein Litowitz Berger & Grossmann, which represents many institutional investors.

During his eleven years at Bernstein Litowitz, Coffey led teams that recovered billions of dollars for victims of corporate fraud. In the WorldCom securities litigation, a case he took to trial in 2005 as lead attorney for thousands of investors, his team recovered over $6 billion from Wall Street banks and required all outside directors and key wrongdoers to contribute millions of dollars from their personal funds. He was selected as one of the National Law Journal's "Top Ten Winning Attorneys" of 2005, and was profiled by the American Lawyer, the Wall Street Journal, and Bloomberg Markets magazine, which dubbed him "Wall Street's New Nemesis".

=== 2010 New York State attorney general election ===
In October 2009, Coffey retired from his partnership at Bernstein Litowitz to pursue the Democratic nomination for New York State attorney general. He reported that he raised over $1.65 million in the first two months of his campaign. His campaign goals included minimizing political corruption and finding a way to advocate for veterans. The Wall Street Journal cited Coffey as one of the top three contenders for the position. Most of the money he raised was from lawyers. Coffey placed third in a five-way race, receiving 16% of the vote, with the winner having been Eric Schneiderman.

==== BlackRobe Capital Partners ====
In late 2011, Coffey and Timothy Scrantom founded BlackRobe Capital Partners, a commercial claim investor based in New York City. The firm shut down one and a half years later, in early 2013.

=== Kramer Levin Naftalis & Frankel ===
In 2013 Coffey joined Kramer Levin Naftalis & Frankel as a lawyer and chairman of its complex litigation department. Reuters writing of Coffey at the time said [that] "Coffey is a rarity in the legal sector, where lawyers are often entrenched at big law firms representing either plaintiffs or defendants and rarely move between them". Then Coffey following through on that told the reporters "I don't consider myself a plaintiffs' lawyer or defense lawyer, I consider myself an advocate who likes to try cases".

Among the notable clients Coffey has defended and or provided legal advice to are the onetime Yahoo! CEO Marissa Meyer, the former Goldman Sachs trader Fabrice Tourre (aka Fabulous Fab), and Hollywood actor and producer Brad Pitt.

In 2019 he was named to the Irish America Business 100.

=== General Counsel of the U.S. Navy ===
On February 26, 2022, Coffey was sworn in as the 24th General Counsel of the U.S. Department of the Navy.

As the General Counsel of the U.S. Department of the Navy and its chief legal officer Coffey led more than 1,100 attorneys and support staff in 140 offices worldwide. Further in this position, Coffey provided legal advice to the Secretary of the Navy, the Under Secretary of the Navy, the Assistant Secretaries of the Navy and their staffs, and the multiple components of the department, to include the Navy and the Marine Corps.

As Navy General Counsel, Coffey led the comprehensive review of the 1944 Port Chicago courts-martial, which led to the Navy's 2024 exoneration of 256 wrongfully convicted African American sailors, including the "Port Chicago 50" who were convicted of mutiny after refusing to resume loading ammunition unless given training to avoid a repeat of the Port Chicago disaster, in which over 300 men had been killed as a result of an unexplained explosion during loading operations. In speaking to the Washington Post about the matter, Coffey stated of the decades ago injustice ... [that] "The trial lawyers did not have time to properly prepare for the case,". In a Georgetown Law School magazine article discussing the case, Coffey stated that another issue was the right to effective counsel, noting that, “The 50 charged with mutiny were divvied up among five so-called counsel, only one of whom was a lawyer.”

=== Career as a mediator ===
After resigning as Navy General Counsel in January 2025, Coffey joined Phillips ADR Enterprises (PADRE”) as a mediator and arbitrator, where he handles complex disputes including securities litigation, antitrust cases, data-breach litigation, class actions, and derivative claims.

His background representing both plaintiffs and defendants in major litigation gives him experience mediating high-stakes commercial disputes.

Coffey was inducted into the National Association of Distinguished Neutrals in 2026.

Academic activity

Coffey has been involved in legal education, serving as an adjunct professor at Georgetown University Law Center, where he taught trial practice for several years and now teaches Professional Responsibility each Fall semester. Coffey is also a Lecturer at Law at Harvard Law School, co-teaching “Lawyering at the Pentagon” in the Spring semester. Coffey was previously an adjunct professor of law at Fordham University.

== Philanthropy ==
Coffey has served on the boards of several nonprofit and professional organizations, including the Federal Bar Foundation, Common Cause New York, the Holocaust & Human Rights Education Center, Greenhope Services for Women, and ThanksUSA, an organization that provides scholarships for military families.

He has also served on the Board of Visitors of Georgetown University Law Center and has funded scholarships supporting veterans, military dependents, and immigrant families.

== Awards and recognition ==
Coffey has received several professional and public service honors, including:

- Department of the Navy Distinguished Public Service Award (2025)
- Friends of Port Chicago National Memorial Commemorative Hero Award (2025)
- Port Chicago Exoneration Hero Award, Contra Costa County Bar Association (2024)
- Federal Bar Council Whitney North Seymour Award for public service (2024)
- John Gardner Lifetime Achievement Award from Common Cause (2019)
- Paul R. Dean Award as an outstanding alumnus of Georgetown Law (2012)
- Holocaust and Human Rights Education Center award for his dedication to human rights and service to the center as a director (2012)
- Council for Unity "Champions for Children" awardee (2011).
- American Jewish Committee Westchester County Chapter Learned Hand Award for achievement and ethics as a lawyer and dedication to human rights (2011)

He was also recognized by the National Law Journal as one of the Top Ten Trial Lawyers in the United States.

== Personal life ==
Coffey married actress Anne Churchill in June 1989. The couple have three children: a daughter, Katharine (born 1992), and two sons, Cameron (born 1994) and Conor (born 1997).

== Notes ==
- Heller, Emily. "John P. Coffey and Max Berger: A good cop/bad cop dynamic scores big. " National Law Journal. June 20, 2005.
- Longstreth, Andrew. "Breaking the Banks." The American Lawyer Dec 2005.
- Longstreth, Andrew. "Taking Citi to School." The American Lawyer Dec 2004.
