= James T. Hill Jr. =

American lawyer (1892–1978)

James T. Hill Jr

Personal details
- Born: 1892 Mayo, Texas, U.S.
- Died: 1978 (aged 85–86) West, Texas, U.S.

James T. Hill Jr. (1892 – 1978) was a lawyer with the United States Department of the Navy and the United States Department of the Air Force.

== Career ==
Hill joined the Department of the Navy's Office of General Counsel (DON-OGC) in 1944. From August 24, 1946, until May 15, 1947, he was General Counsel of the Navy.

On July 31, 1950, Hill began working as the General Counsel of the Air Force. He held this position until 1952, when he was promoted and became Assistant Secretary of the Air Force.

Government offices
Preceded by William Wemple	General Counsel of the Navy; August 24, 1946 – May 15, 1947	Succeeded by Hudson B. Cox
