= Hudson B. Cox =

United States lawyer, General Counsel of the Navy 1947-9

Hudson B. Cox was an American lawyer who served as General Counsel of the Navy from May 16, 1947 until April 29, 1949.

== Life and career ==
Cox graduated from Stanford University in 1932 and from Harvard Law School in 1935.

In May 1947, Cox was appointed General Counsel of the Navy by James Forrestal, U.S. Secretary of the Navy. He was previously the assistant general counsel of the Navy. Cox was preceded by James T. Hill Jr. In January 1947, Cox represented the Navy in a hearing on the Elk Hills Oil Field. Cox was succeeded as General Counsel of the Navy by Harold B. Gross.

Cox is the author of Renegotiation of Government Contracts Under the 1951 and 1948 Renegotiation Acts, published by The Bureau of National Affairs, Inc. in 1951.

Cox was a member of the Jonathan Club of Los Angeles.

Government offices
Preceded by James T. Hill, Jr.	General Counsel of the Navy; May 16, 1947 – April 29, 1949	Succeeded by Harold B. Gross
