= Robert Sander =

American lawyer (born 1974)

Robert J. Sander
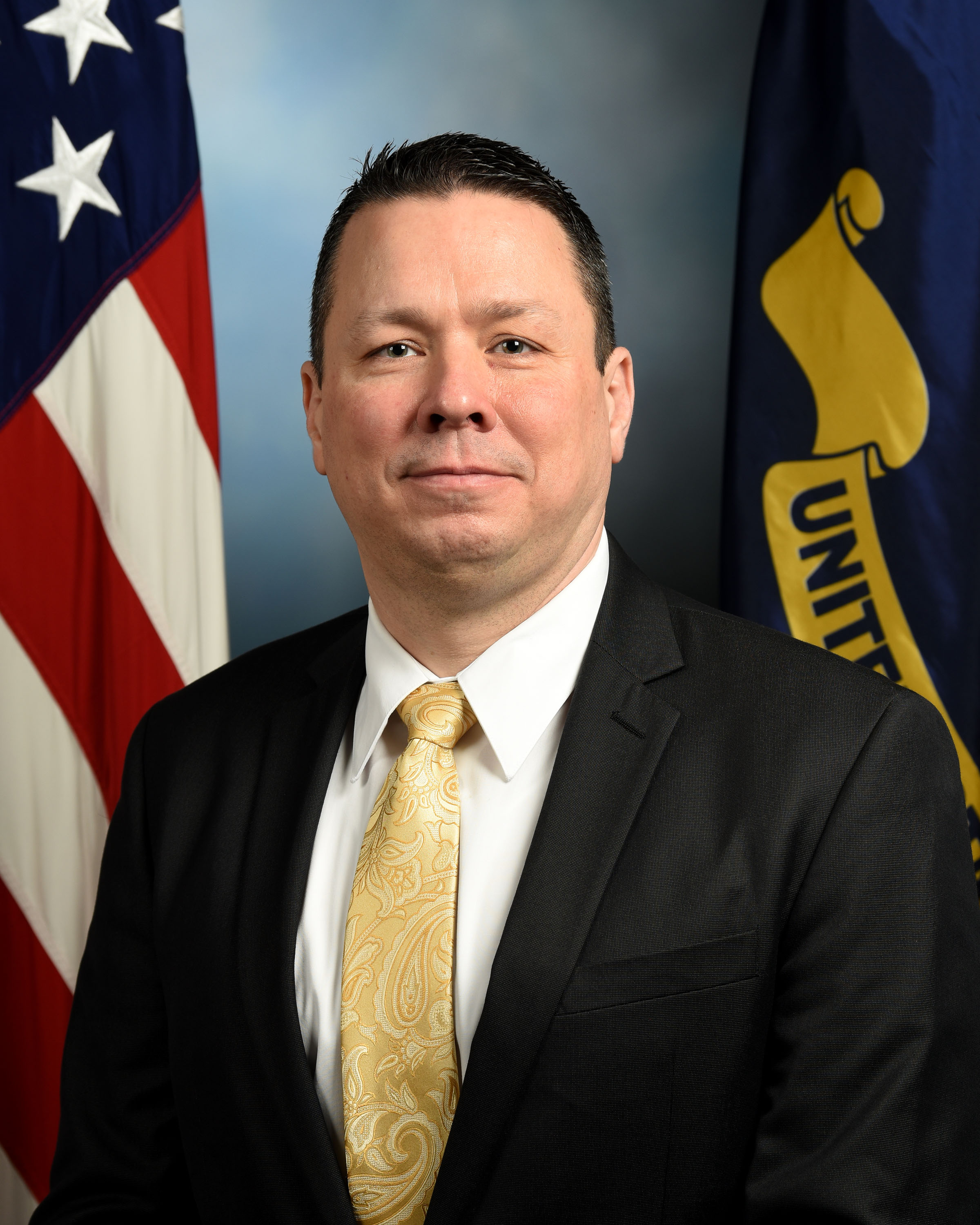

23rd General Counsel of the Navy
- In office January 6, 2020 – January 20, 2021
- Appointed by: Donald Trump
- Preceded by: Paul L. Oostburg Sanz
- Succeeded by: Sean Coffey

Personal details
- Born: Philadelphia, Pennsylvania
- Education: Temple University, B.B.A. Widener University School of Law, J.D. National Intelligence University, M.S.S.I.

Military service
- Allegiance: United States
- Branch/service: United States Army Reserve
- Years of service: 2000-Present
- Rank: Lieutenant Colonel

Robert John Sander (born 1974) is an American lawyer and government official.

He served as the 23rd General Counsel of the Department of the Navy in the Trump administration between January 6, 2020 and January 20, 2021. As General Counsel, he is the Department of the Navy’s Chief Legal Officer and head of the Office of the General Counsel, leading over 1,100 civilian and uniformed attorneys and professional support staff in 140 offices worldwide. The Navy Office of General Counsel provides legal advice to the Secretary of the Navy, the Under Secretary of the Navy, the Assistant Secretaries of the Navy and their staffs, and the multiple components of the Department, to include the Navy and the Marine Corps.

== Education ==
Sander was born and raised in Philadelphia, Pennsylvania. He received his undergraduate degree from Temple University, his J.D. degree from the Widener University School of Law, and a Master of Science of Strategic Intelligence from the National Intelligence University.

== Career ==
On April 26, 2019, President Trump announced his intent to nominate Sander as the Navy General Counsel. On September 9, 2019, his nomination was sent to the Senate. On October 29, 2019, a hearing on his nomination was held before the Senate Armed Services Committee. The Senate voted unanimously to confirm Sander on December 19, 2019.

On September 1, 2023, Sander founded The Sander Group, PLLC in Alexandria, VA, which focuses on advising businesses and organizations on National Security and Government Contract related issues. Previously, Sander was a Partner in the Law Firm of Ward & Berry, PLLC in Tysons, VA.

Prior to serving as Navy General Counsel, Sander was the Principal Deputy General Counsel of the Department of the Army from 2018 to 2020. From 2010 to 2018, Sander was a federal prosecutor with the U.S. Department of Justice, National Security Division, Counterterrorism Section. During this time he also served a detail to the Office of the Director of National Intelligence Office of General Counsel, and as a Special Assistant United States Attorney for the Eastern District of Pennsylvania. Previously, he was a prosecutor with the Montgomery County District Attorney's Office from 1999 to 2010, where he rose to become Chief of the Economic Crimes Unit and the Captain of the Narcotics Enforcement Team.

Sander is also a Lieutenant Colonel in the United States Army Reserve Judge Advocate General’s Corps.
