= Vaughn Ary =

United States Marine Corps general

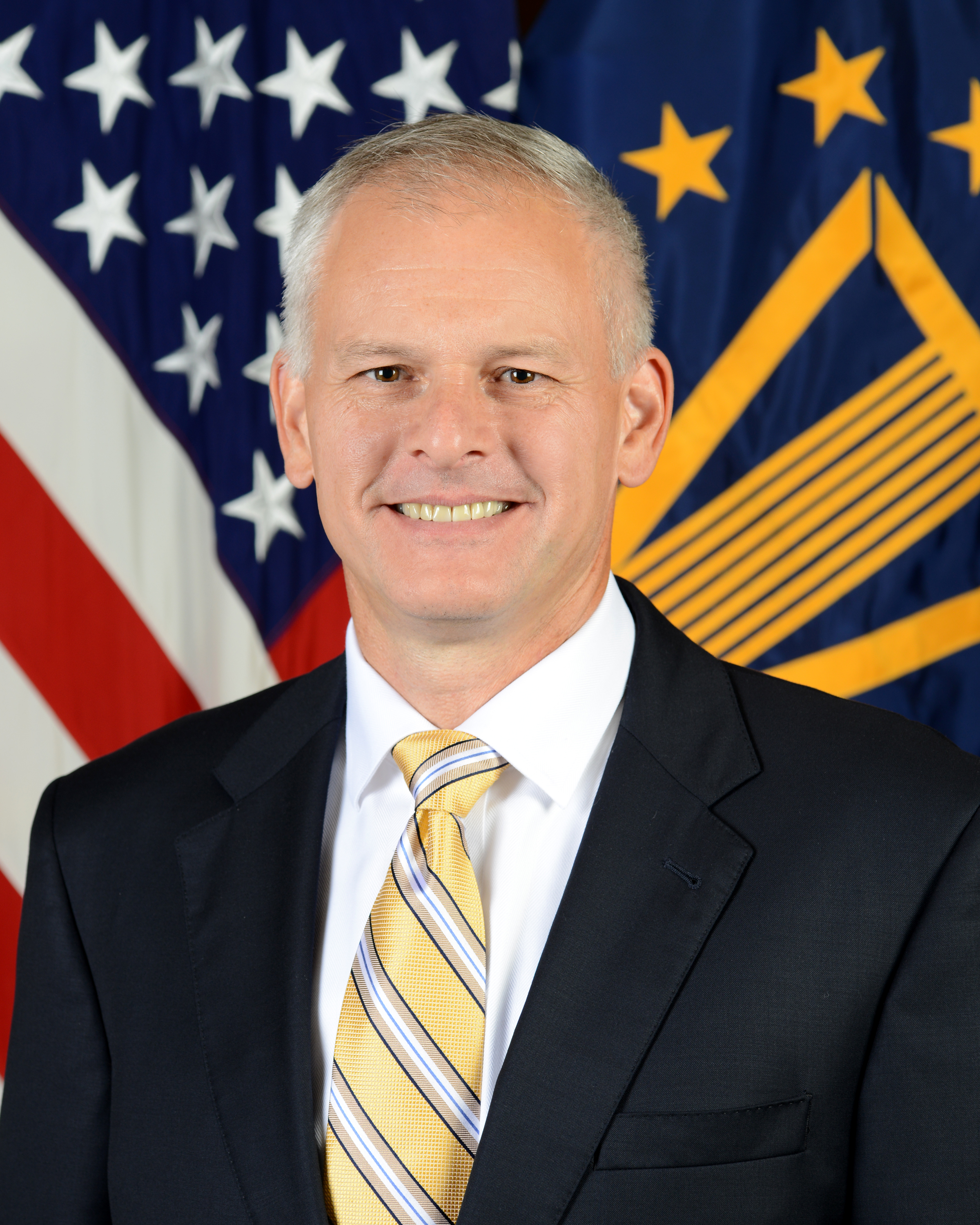
- Vaughn Ary in 2014
- Military career
- Allegiance: United States
- Branch: United States Marine Corps
- Rank: Major general
- Commands: United States Marine Corps Judge Advocate Division
- Awards: Distinguished Service Medal (US Navy), Defense Meritorious Service Medal, Meritorious Service Medal (5 Awards), Navy and Marine Corps Commendation Medal, Navy and Marine Corps Achievement Medal

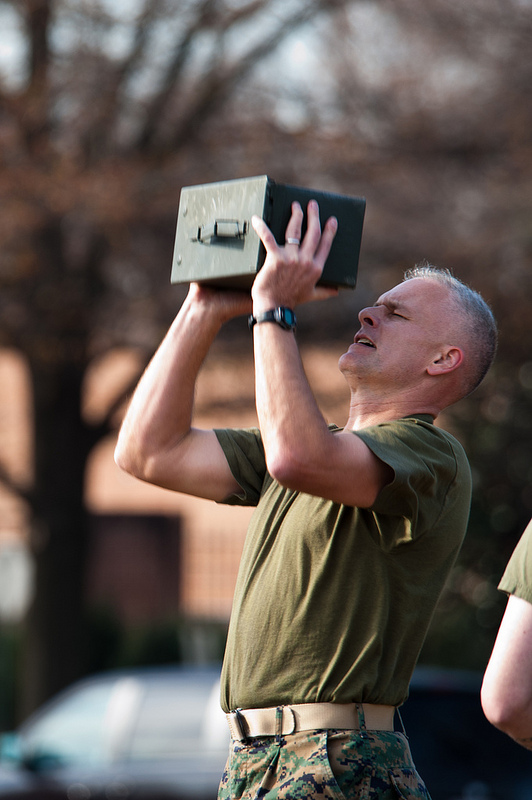
Major General Ary undergoing the Combat Fitness Test

Vaughn A. Ary is a retired American major general and the former staff judge advocate to the Commandant of the Marine Corps and director of the United States Marine Corps Judge Advocate Division. Ary was forced to retire from his role of Convening Authority for military commissions for Guantanamo Bay detention camp, by a U.S. Federal judge, after five months. Ary currently serves as U.S. Department of Justice as Director of the Office of International Affairs, where he has responsibility for U.S.-initiated extraditions and U.S.-requested deportations.

== Early life ==
Ary was raised in Ada, Oklahoma. He received his BA from Northwestern Oklahoma State University in 1984 and his JD from the University of Oklahoma College of Law in 1987.

== Military career ==
After graduating from Officer Candidates School, The Basic School, and Naval Justice School, Ary reported to the 3rd Force Service Support Group in Okinawa, Japan. In 1990, he deployed to serve in the Gulf War with the 1st Force Service Support Group. He spent the next two years as the Deputy Staff Judge Advocate of US Marine Forces, Atlantic before attending a one-year LLM program at George Washington University Law School. In 1994, he was assigned to the Pentagon to serve as the Head of the Law of Armed Conflict Branch in the Office of the Judge Advocate General of the Navy. In 1996, he was selected to serve as Deputy Legal Counsel to the Chairman of the Joint Chiefs of Staff. Following this tour of duty, he received a Masters of Military Studies from the Marine Corps Command and Staff College and was reassigned to the 1st Force Service Support Group as the officer in charge of Legal Teams Delta and Echo. He served as the Staff Judge Advocate of the 1st Force Service Support Group during Operation Iraqi Freedom I and II. From 2004 to 2006, he served as the Commanding Officer of the 2nd Recruit Training Battalion in San Diego. Following promotion to Colonel, he served as the Staff Judge Advocate of the 3rd Marine Aircraft Wing. He returned to the Pentagon in 2008 to serve as the Deputy Staff Judge Advocate to the Commandant of the Marine Corps. He became the Staff Judge Advocate to the Commandant of the Marine Corps (SJA to CMC) in 2009.

Major General Ary assumed his duties as SJA to CMC at a time when the Marine Corps and the Navy were under intense Congressional scrutiny for their management of judge advocate assets and their processing of post-trial courts-martial. This scrutiny led to two inquiries: one by the Department of Defense Inspector General and another by a congressionally appointed panel (the “506 Panel”).

In response, Major General Ary developed and implemented the Legal Services Strategic Action Plan 2010-2015, which was published in the summer of 2010. This publication took a critical look at the Marine Corps legal community's mission, role, and organizational structure. It also outlined a new strategic vision for the future of the Marine legal community and established an action plan leading to a number of major reforms. To ensure timely and accurate post-trial processing, Major General Ary implemented the Case Management System (CMS), the first Marine Corps-wide single, common court-martial tracking system. In 2011, Major General Ary reorganized the Judge Advocate Division establishing a second Deputy Director position responsible for Community Development, Strategy, and Plans (CDSP). The CDSP branch now sets standards for the Marine Corps legal community, develops training and equipment to help meet those standards, and creates metrics by which those standards can be inspected. In addition, the CDSP branch performs long-term strategic planning for the legal community and has the lead on developing future doctrine for the provision of legal support within the Marine Corps.

Also in 2011, Major General Ary directed the reorganization of the legal defense community into the Marine Corps Defense Services Organization (DSO). Creation of the DSO, led by the Chief Defense Counsel of the Marine Corps, increased the autonomy of the defense bar and enabled the defense community to create a true community of practice, that can better address matters unique to defending Marines.

In 2012, Major General Ary directed a major reorganization of the structure and processes for the delivery of legal support in the Marine Corps. Major General Ary focused the reorganization to provide for greater levels of individual proficiency, organizational efficiency, and institutional accountability. Central to this reorganization was regionalization. During the summer of 2012, the Marine Corps replaced 16 stove-piped law offices with 4 regional Legal Services Support Sections (LSSSs) and 9 subordinate Legal Services Support Teams (LSSTs). Consolidation of all legal services into these 4 LSSSs, which affected over 49 different commands and over 800 active, reserve and civilian billets, significantly improved the quality, timeliness, and uniformity of the delivery of legal services. To further enhance the capabilities of the regional LSSSs, Major General Ary introduced Highly Qualified Experts, military criminal investigators, and Marine paralegals to address the complexity of courts-martial litigation and increase the effectiveness in the execution of the legal support mission.

Major General Ary retired in July 2014.

== Convening Authority over military commissions ==
In September 2014, Ary became the Convening Authority in charge of the military commissions at Guantanamo. One of his first actions was to implement, in January 2015, a policy called "Change One"; which required military commission judges to relocate to Guantanamo Bay "to accelerate the pace of litigation." This was immediately criticized by military commission judge Spath as "unlawful influence" on proceedings, and Ary was required to testify about this at the hearing of Abd al Rahim al Nashiri. In March 2015, "Change One" was rescinded, Judge Spath ruled Ary's actions may have served to undermine public confidence in the fairness of the proceedings in the al Nashiri hearings and required that Ary be replaced as convening authority.

== Central authority for U.S. extraditions ==
Since March 2016, Ary has served as the Director, Office of International Affairs (OIA), U.S. Department of Justice. In this, Ary became head of the U.S. central authority for mutual legal assistance treaty interactions and for international extraditions and deportations organized by the United States.

Military offices
Preceded by James C. Walker	Staff Judge Advocate to the Commandant of the Marine Corps; 2009–2014	Succeeded by John R. Ewers
