= Solicitor General of the Navy =

Former office of the United States Navy

The Solicitor General of the Navy was an office of the United States Department of the Navy that existed periodically from 1862 until 1929. In 1941, it was superseded by the permanent office of General Counsel of the Navy. The Solicitor General of the Navy was the senior legal adviser to the United States Secretary of the Navy.

== Solicitors General of the Navy, 1862–1929 ==
Name	Assumed office	Left office	President appointed by
Nathaniel Wilson	1862	March 1865	Abraham Lincoln
William E. Chandler	March 1865	Fall 1865	Abraham Lincoln
John Augustus Bolles	Fall 1865	May 25, 1878	Andrew Johnson
Edwin P. Hanna	July 1, 1899	July 3, 1909	William McKinley
Henry M. Butler	February 1, 1910	March 31, 1911	William Howard Taft
Tristam B. Johnson	April 1, 1911	July 16, 1911	William Howard Taft
Harry W. Miller	January 3, 1912	August 9, 1913	William Howard Taft
Graham Egerton	1913	1921	Woodrow Wilson
Pickens Neagle	September 2, 1921	June 30, 1929	Warren G. Harding
