= Craig S. King =

American lawyer

Craig King
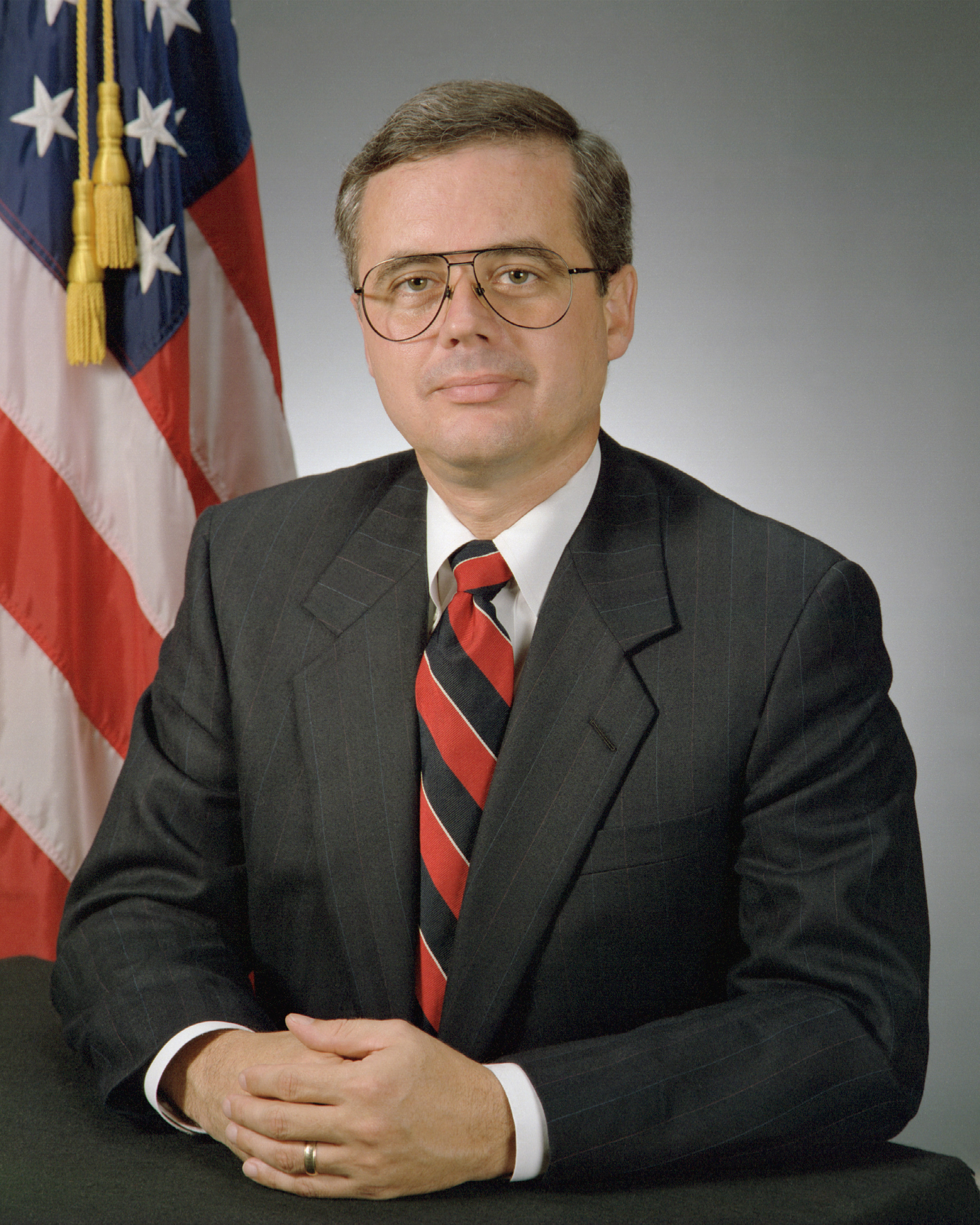

General Counsel of the Navy
- In office November 22, 1989 – January 20, 1993
- President: George H. W. Bush
- Preceded by: Lawrence L. Lamade
- Succeeded by: Steven S. Honigman

Personal details
- Born: February 4, 1953 (age 73) American Fork, Utah, U.S.
- Education: Brigham Young University (BA); Georgetown University (JD)

Craig Stephen King (born February 4, 1953) is an American lawyer who served as General Counsel of the Navy from 1989 to 1993.

== Early life and education ==
King was born in American Fork, Utah on February 4, 1953. He attended Brigham Young University, graduating with a B.A. in April 1977. He then attended the Georgetown University Law Center, receiving a Juris Doctor in May 1980.

== Career ==
After graduating from law school, King became an associate attorney in the Washington, D.C. office of Dewey Ballantine. In 1989, he moved to the Washington, D.C. office of Sidley Austin. King's practice focused on antitrust counseling and litigation. An active member of the Republican Party, King served as Director of Survey Research for Ronald Reagan's re-election campaign in 1984 and was a senior advisor to the George H. W. Bush 1988 presidential campaign.

On August 24, 1989, George H. W. Bush nominated King as General Counsel of the Navy. After Senate confirmation, King held this office from November 22, 1989, until January 20, 1993.

Upon leaving the United States Department of the Navy, King joined Arent Fox as a partner, where his practice focuses on government contracts and grants.
