= Meritt H. Steger =

American lawyer

Meritt Homer Steger

Personal details
- Born: August 25, 1906 Virginia, U.S.
- Died: March 5, 1998 (aged 91) Fairfax, Virginia, U.S.
- Political party: Republican

Meritt Homer Steger (August 25, 1906 – March 5, 1998) was a United States lawyer who served as General Counsel of the Navy from May 2, 1960, until May 31, 1971.

He was married in 1929; his wife died in 1987. He died of coronary heart disease in Fairfax, Virginia at the age of 91.

Government offices
Preceded by F. Trowbridge vom Baur	General Counsel of the Navy; May 2, 1960 – May 31, 1971	Succeeded by Hart T. Mankin
