= H. Struve Hensel =

American lawyer

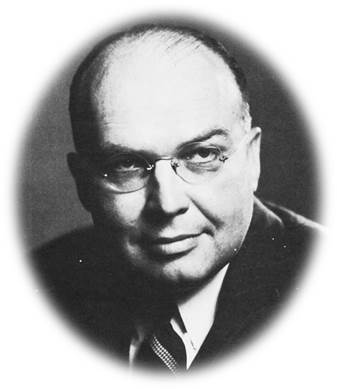

General Counsel of the Navy
- In office July 10, 1941 – January 30, 1945
- President: Franklin D. Roosevelt
- Preceded by: Office Established
- Succeeded by: W. John Kenney

21st Assistant Secretary of the Navy
- In office January 30, 1945 – February 28, 1946
- President: Franklin D. Roosevelt Harry S. Truman
- Preceded by: Ralph Austin Bard
- Succeeded by: W. John Kenney

General Counsel of the Department of Defense
- In office August 17, 1953 – March 4, 1954
- President: Dwight D. Eisenhower
- Preceded by: Office Established
- Succeeded by: Wilber M. Brucker

Assistant Secretary of Defense for International Security Affairs
- In office March 5, 1954 – June 30, 1955
- President: Dwight D. Eisenhower
- Preceded by: Frank C. Nash
- Succeeded by: Gordon Gray

Personal details
- Born: August 22, 1901 Hoboken, New Jersey
- Died: May 27, 1991 (aged 89) Boca Raton, Florida
- Known for: U.S. government attorney, target of McCarthyism

Herman Struve Hensel (August 22, 1901 – May 27, 1991) was an American international lawyer who served in several senior positions in the Department of the Navy and the Department of Defense from 1941 to 1946 and from 1952 to 1955.

== Biography ==
Hensel was born in Hoboken, New Jersey. His father was president of a small bank and his mother was active in Republican politics. He was president of his class at Princeton University and graduated in 1922. He attended Columbia University Law School. After graduation, Hensel worked at Cravath, Swaine & Moore and later at Milbank, Tweed.

In 1940 Hensel moved to Washington, D.C., to serve as the first chief of the United States Department of the Navy's legal division for procurement. The next year, President Franklin D. Roosevelt named Hensel the first General Counsel of the Navy. Hensel served as the Navy's General Counsel from July 10, 1941, until January 30, 1945. In early 1945, Roosevelt nominated him as Assistant Secretary of the Navy, and Hensel held that office from January 30, 1945, to February 28, 1946.

In 1946, Hensel joined the Manhattan law firm of Carter Ledyard & Milburn. He returned to public service in 1952, when he became General Counsel of the Department of Defense. He was named Assistant Secretary of Defense for International Security Affairs in March 1954.

In 1954, Senator Joseph McCarthy said Hensel "masterminded" the U.S. Army's list of charges against McCarthy and his investigators in order to stop McCarthy's investigation of allegations into Hensel's private business dealings while in government service; specifically, allegations that Hensel, while working in procurement for the U.S. Navy during World War II, improperly aided in the formation of a company to supply private shipping companies. Hensel called these accusations "barefaced lies." McCarthy did not present testimony about Hensel before the Senate Permanent Subcommittee on Investigations and refused to withdraw his charges, claiming that President Eisenhower's orders on secrecy made it impossible to present his case. The President's order prohibited public discussion of "confidential discussions within the executive branch. Hensel was not allowed to testify since no charges against him were presented to the subcommittee. Over the objections of the subcommittee's three Democrats, its four Republicans voted to dismiss the misconduct charges on May 26. Joseph Welch, special counsel for the U.S. Army in its dispute with McCarthy, called the action "a stab in the heart."

In June, journalists reported that McCarthy had told other senators in May that he had assumed that Hensel was behind the Army's charges against him because his name appeared on the letter of transmittal when the Army sent its response to the committee, but by May 17 he was uncertain of Hensel's role.

Hensel swore an affidavit on June 16, 1954, denying McCarthy's charges, sent it to the subcommittee's chairman, Senator Karl Mundt, and made it public.

Hensel left the Defense Department on June 30, 1955, citing the financial hardship of government service. He joined Simpson Thacher & Bartlett and practiced international law in Washington, D.C. From 1966 to 1977, he was a partner with Coudert Brothers. He remained active in corporate and legal affairs until he moved to Deerfield Beach, Florida, in 1990.

Hensel died May 27, 1991, of heart failure at Boca Raton Community Hospital in Boca Raton, Florida.

Government offices
| Preceded by New office | General Counsel of the Navy; July 10, 1941 – January 30, 1945 | Succeeded by W. John Kenney |
| Preceded by Ralph Austin Bard | Assistant Secretary of the Navy; January 30, 1945 – February 28, 1946 | Succeeded by W. John Kenney |
| Preceded by New office | General Counsel of the Department of Defense; August 17, 1953 – March 4, 1954 | Succeeded by Wilber M. Brucker |
| Preceded by Frank C. Nash | Assistant Secretary of Defense for International Security Affairs; March 5, 1954 – June 30, 1955 | Succeeded by Gordon Gray |
