= Bachelor of Criminal Justice =

A Bachelor of Criminal Justice (abbreviated BCJ) is an undergraduate academic degree in the field of criminal justice. Universities that offer a BCJ include University of Colorado Denver, Florida Institute of Technology, New England College, Loyola University in New Orleans, Ohio University, Lancaster Bible College Tiffin University, Saint Leo University, University of Hong Kong, Washburn University., University of Texas at El Paso, New Mexico State University, and the University of Canterbury in New Zealand.
