= General Counsel of the Navy =

Senior civilian counsel of the Department of the Navy

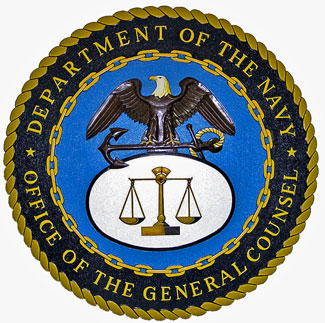
- Seal of the Office of the General Counsel

- Flag of the general counsel and assistant secretaries of the Navy

- Incumbent; David Denton Jr. since December 19, 2025
- Department of the Navy; Office of the Secretary
- Style: The Honorable (formal address in writing)
- Reports to: Secretary of the Navy; Under Secretary of the Navy
- Seat: The Pentagon, Arlington County, Virginia, United States
- Nominator: The president with Senate advice and consent
- Term length: No fixed term
- Constituting instrument: 10 U.S.C. § 8019
- Precursor: Solicitor General of the Navy
- Formation: 1941
- First holder: H. Struve Hensel
- Succession: 18th in SecDef succession by seniority of appointment
- Deputy: Principal Deputy General Counsel
- Salary: Executive Schedule, level IV
- Website: Official website

The general counsel of the Department of the Navy is the senior civilian lawyer in the U.S. Department of the Navy and is the senior legal adviser to the secretary of the navy. The Office of the General Counsel of the Navy provides legal advice to the secretary, the under secretary and the various assistant secretaries and their staffs. The general counsel is the third highest-ranking civilian office in the Department of the Navy, behind the Secretary and Under Secretary of the Navy.

The general counsel maintains a close working relationship with the judge advocate general, the senior uniformed lawyer in the Department of the Navy who performs statutory duties under the Uniform Code of Military Justice.

The general counsel manages nearly 650 attorneys worldwide, helps to oversee the Naval Criminal Investigative Service, and advises senior Navy and Marine Corps officials on litigation, acquisition, contractual, fiscal, environmental, property, personnel, legislative, ethics, and intelligence law issues.

== List of General counsels of the navy, 1941—present ==
The first general counsel of the navy was appointed in 1941. From 1862 to 1941, essentially the same function was provided by the Solicitor General of the Navy.

Image	Name	Assumed office	Left office	President appointed by	Secretary served under
	H. Struve Hensel	July 10, 1941	January 30, 1945	Franklin D. Roosevelt	Frank Knox; James Forrestal
	W. John Kenney	February 5, 1945	April 2, 1945	Franklin D. Roosevelt	James Forrestal
	Patrick H. Hodgson	April 3, 1945	October 31, 1945	Franklin D. Roosevelt	James Forrestal
	J. Henry Neale	November 1, 1945	July 26, 1946	Harry S. Truman	James Forrestal
	William Wemple	July 27, 1946	August 23, 1946	Harry S. Truman	James Forrestal
	James T. Hill, Jr.	August 24, 1946	May 15, 1947	Harry S. Truman	James Forrestal
	Hudson B. Cox	May 16, 1947	April 29, 1949	Harry S. Truman	James Forrestal; John L. Sullivan
	Harold B. Gross	April 30, 1949	August 30, 1953	Harry S. Truman	Francis P. Matthews; Dan A. Kimball; Robert B. Anderson
	F. Trowbridge vom Baur	December 15, 1953	April 30, 1960	Dwight D. Eisenhower	Robert B. Anderson; Charles Thomas; Thomas S. Gates, Jr. William B. Franke
	Meritt H. Steger	May 2, 1960	May 31, 1971	Dwight D. Eisenhower	William B. Franke; John Connally; Fred Korth; Paul Nitze; Paul Robert Ignatius; John Chafee
	Hart T. Mankin	June 7, 1971	July 21, 1973	Richard Nixon	John Chafee; John Warner
	E. Grey Lewis	August 1, 1973	April 21, 1977	Richard Nixon	John Warner; J. William Middendorf
	Togo D. West, Jr.	April 22, 1977	January 13, 1979	Jimmy Carter	W. Graham Claytor, Jr.
	Coleman Hicks	May 25, 1979	January 13, 1981	Jimmy Carter	Edward Hidalgo
	Hugh O'Neill (Acting)	June 1981	August 24, 1981	Ronald Reagan	John Lehman
	Walter T. Skallerup, Jr.	August 24, 1981	July 29, 1987	Ronald Reagan	John Lehman
	Harvey J. Wilcox (Deputy GC)	July 29, 1987	November 21, 1988	Ronald Reagan	Jim Webb; William L. Ball
	Lawrence L. Lamade	November 22, 1988	November 21, 1989	Ronald Reagan	William L. Ball; Henry L. Garrett III
	Craig S. King	November 22, 1989	January 20, 1993	George H. W. Bush	Henry L. Garrett III; Sean O'Keefe
	Steven S. Honigman	June 1, 1993	March 15, 1998	Bill Clinton	John Howard Dalton
	Eugene Angrist (Deputy GC)	March 15, 1998	September 28, 1998	Bill Clinton	John Howard Dalton
	Stephen W. Preston	September 28, 1998	November 17, 2000	Bill Clinton	Richard Danzig
	John E. Sparks (acting)	November 17, 2000	December 12, 2000	Bill Clinton	Richard Danzig
	William Molzahn (Deputy GC)	December 12, 2000	July 25, 2001	Bill Clinton; George W. Bush	Richard Danzig
	Alberto J. Mora	July 25, 2001	January 1, 2006	George W. Bush	Gordon R. England
	Paul C. Ney, Jr. (acting)	January 2, 2006	September 25, 2006	George W. Bush	Donald C. Winter
	Frank Jimenez	September 25, 2006	April 30, 2009	George W. Bush	Donald C. Winter
	Anne M. Brennan (acting)	April 30, 2009	March 11, 2010	Barack Obama	Ray Mabus
	Paul L. Oostburg Sanz	March 12, 2010	January 20, 2017	Barack Obama	Ray Mabus
	Anne M. Brennan (acting)	January 20, 2017	March 6, 2019	Donald J Trump	Richard V. Spencer
	Garrett L. Ressing (acting)	March 7, 2019	January 5, 2020	Donald J Trump	Richard V. Spencer; Thomas B. Modly (acting)
	Robert Sander	January 6, 2020	January 20, 2021	Donald J Trump	Thomas B. Modly (acting)
	Garrett L. Ressing (acting)	January 20, 2021	February 16, 2022	Joe Biden	Thomas Harker (acting); Carlos Del Toro
	Sean Coffey	February 16, 2022	January 20, 2025	Joe Biden	Carlos Del Toro
	Catherine L. Kessmeier (acting)	January 20, 2025	July 21, 2025	Donald Trump	Terence G. Emmert (acting); John Phelan
	Tim Dill (acting)	July 21, 2025	December 19, 2025	Donald Trump	John Phelan
	David Denton Jr.	December 19, 2025	Present	Donald Trump	John Phelan; Hung Cao (acting)

== See also ==
- General Counsel of the Department of Defense
- General Counsel of the Army
- General Counsel of the Department of the Air Force
