= Harold B. Gross =

General Counsel of the Navy

Harold B. Gross was a United States lawyer who served as General Counsel of the Navy from April 30, 1949, until August 30, 1953.

Government offices
Preceded by Hudson B. Cox	General Counsel of the Navy; April 30, 1949 – August 30, 1953	Succeeded by F. Trowbridge vom Baur
