= Lawrence L. Lamade =

United States lawyer (born 1947)

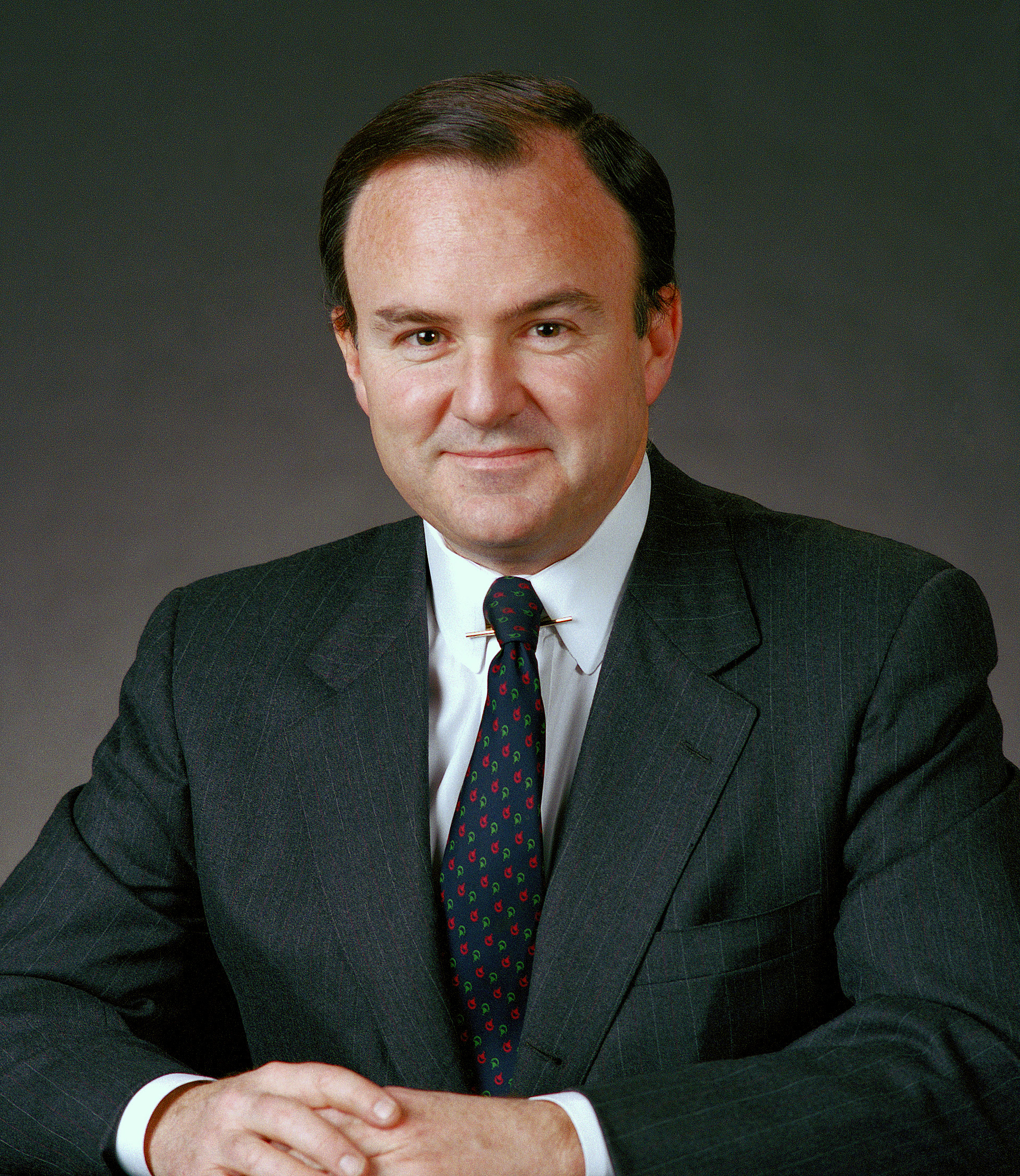
Lawrence Lamade in March 1989

Lawrence Lewis Lamade (born April 12, 1947) is a United States lawyer who was General Counsel of the Navy from 1988 to 1989.

== Biography ==
Lawrence Lamade was born in Manhattan, New York City and raised in Maryland. He attended the Landon School, followed by Princeton University, receiving his B.A. in 1969. Lamade then served as an officer in the United States Navy from 1969 to 1972. Upon leaving the Navy, he attended the Georgetown University Law Center and received a J.D. in 1975.

After law school, Lamade joined Baker & Hostetler as an associate attorney. In 1983, he became a partner at Baker & Hostetler.

On October 21, 1988, President of the United States Ronald Reagan nominated Lamade as General Counsel of the Navy and Lamade subsequently held this office from November 22, 1988 until November 21, 1989.

After leaving the Department of the Navy, Lamade returned to private practice. In 2000, he became a partner at Akin Gump Strauss Hauer & Feld, where his practice has focused on employee benefits

Government offices
Preceded by Walter T. Skallerup, Jr. Harvey J. Wilcox (Deputy GC)	General Counsel of the Navy; November 22, 1988 – November 21, 1989	Succeeded by Craig S. King
