= John R. Ewers =

United States Marine Corps general

John R. Ewers, Jr.
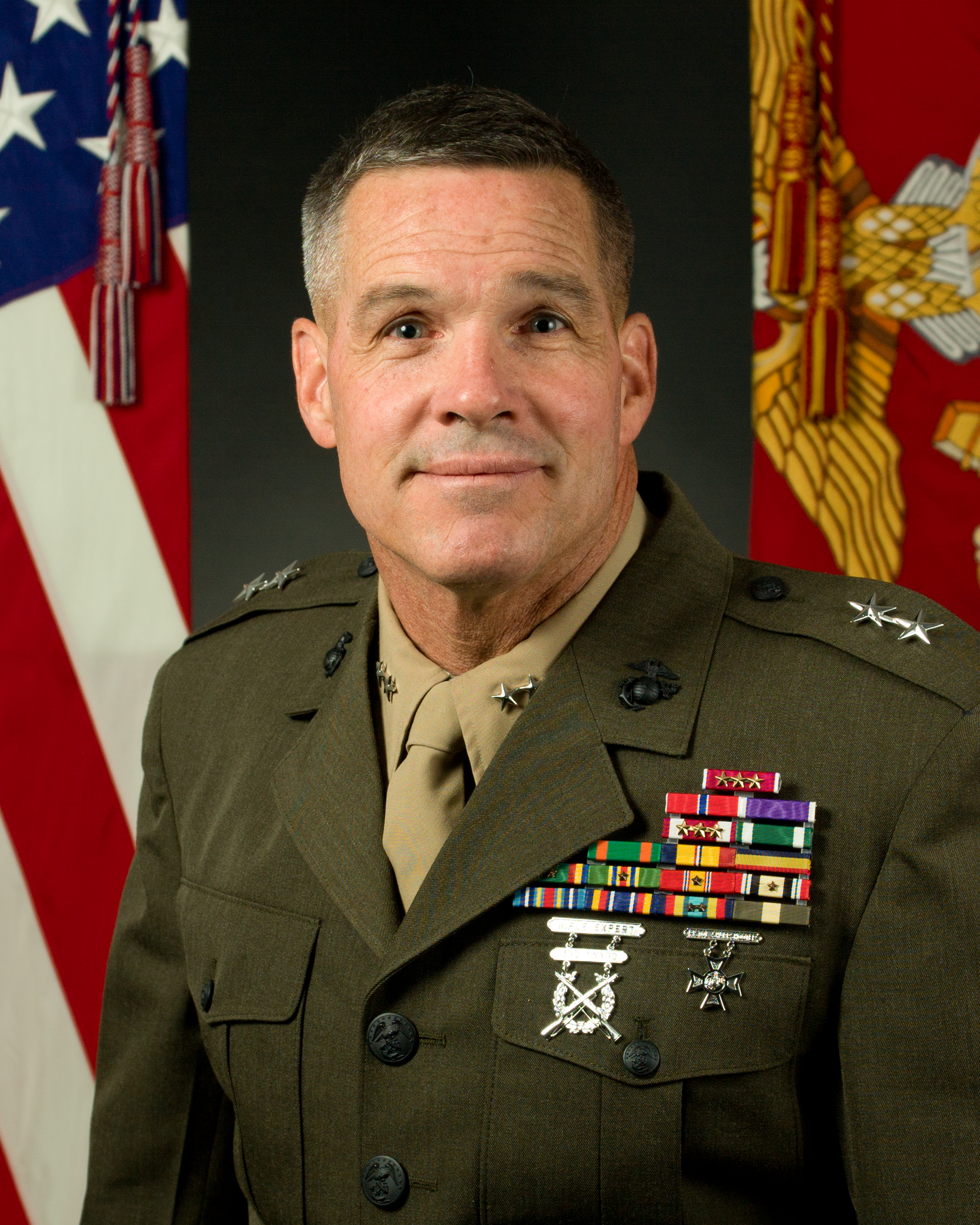
- Spouse: Elisa Catalano Ewers
- Military career
- Allegiance: United States of America
- Branch: United States Marine Corps
- Service years: 1984-2018
- Rank: Major General
- Conflicts: Operation Iraqi Freedom
- Awards: Legion of Merit; Bronze Star; Purple Heart; Meritorious Service Medal; Navy-Marine Corps Commendation Medal; Navy-Marine Corps Achievement Medal; Combat Action Ribbon; Drill Instructor Ribbon

John R. Ewers, Jr. is a retired major general in the United States Marine Corps. He was the 19th staff Judge advocate to the Commandant of the Marine Corps.

== Early life ==
MajGen Ewers was born and raised in the Washington, D.C., area. He received his undergraduate degree from the University of Delaware in 1981, where he majored in philosophy and political science. He earned his Juris Doctor at Georgetown University Law Center in 1985.

== Military career ==
MajGen Ewers received his commission as a second lieutenant in 1984. He soon became a certified judge advocate. As a junior officer, MajGen Ewers served as a prosecutor, defense counsel, special assistant U.S. Attorney, deputy staff judge advocate, military justice officer, and a recruit training series commander. MajGen Ewers received his Master of Laws as an honor graduate from the U.S. Army Judge Advocate General School in 1994. He then went on to serve as a military judge from 1996 to 1999, on the Sierra Judicial Circuit, Navy-Marine Corps Trial Judiciary. From 2000 to 2002, then-Lieutenant Colonel Ewers was the officer in charge of the Legal Service Support Section, 1st Force Service Support Group and was responsible for developing legal service support plan for I Marine Expeditionary Force for what became Operation Iraqi Freedom. In 2002, he was assigned as the staff judge advocate (SJA) for the 1st Marine Division. On 22 March 2003 Ewers was wounded three times by gunfire during an ambush in southern Iraq.

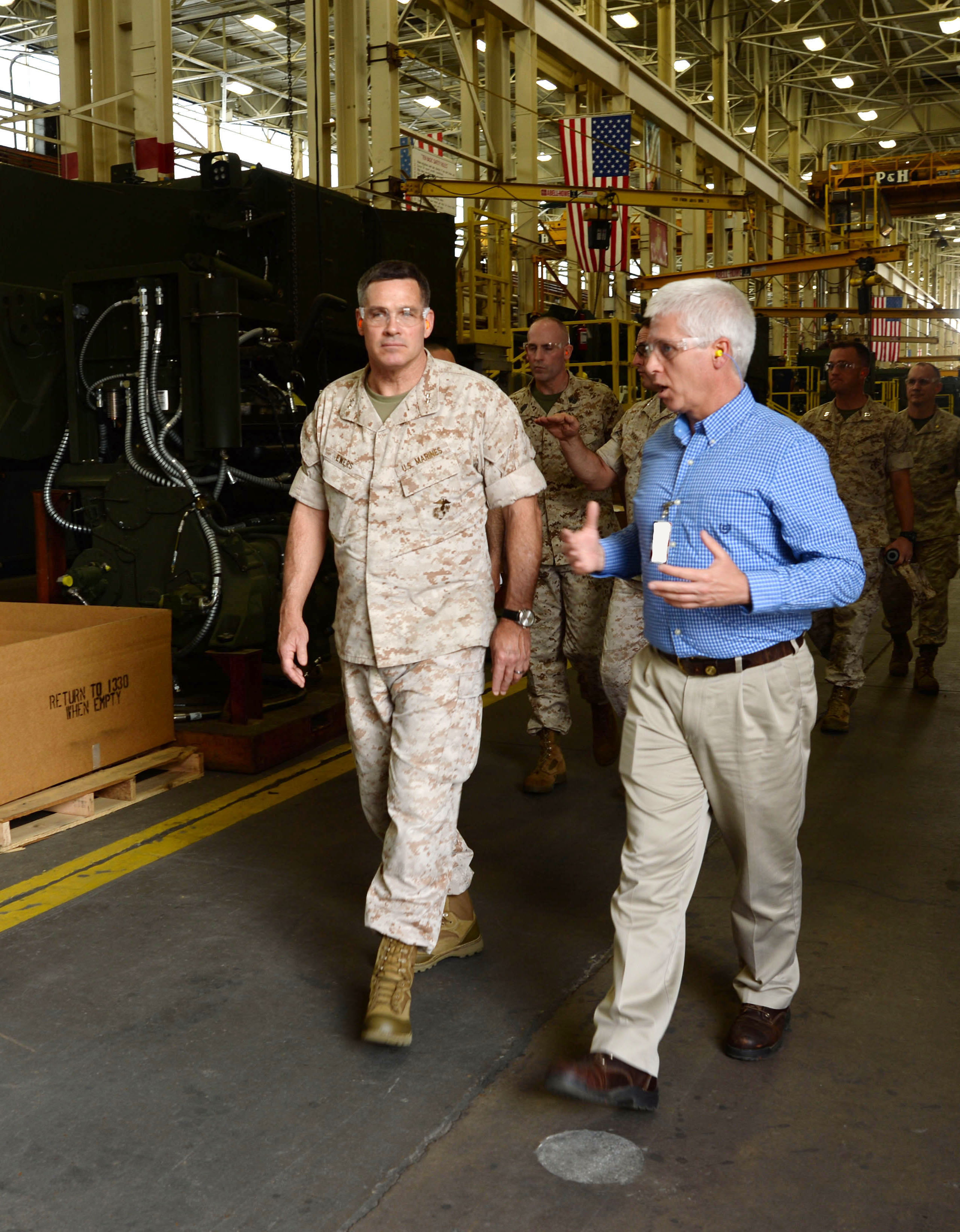
MARINE CORPS LOGISTICS BASE ALBANY - Maj. Gen. John Ewers, Staff Judge Advocate to the Commandant of the Marine Corps, listens to Darren Jones, Marine Depot Maintenance Command/Production Plant Albany plant manager, explain the maintenance processes. Ewers toured MCLB Albany April 6.

After returning from Iraq, he left the division when he was chosen to serve as the commanding officer of the Third Recruit Training Battalion, MCRD, San Diego. While in command, Ewers was selected for the rank of colonel and, in turn, selected as a commandant of the Marine Corps Fellow at the Center for Strategic and International Studies where he was assigned during the 2004–2005 (top-level school) academic year. He is also a distinguished graduate of the U.S. Marine Corps Command and Staff College.

In August 2005, Ewers assumed duties as SJA, I MEF, and soon thereafter was assigned to work economics and governance issues for I MEF (Forward), eventually serving as deputy team leader, Al Anbar Provincial Reconstruction Team, in 2006-2007.

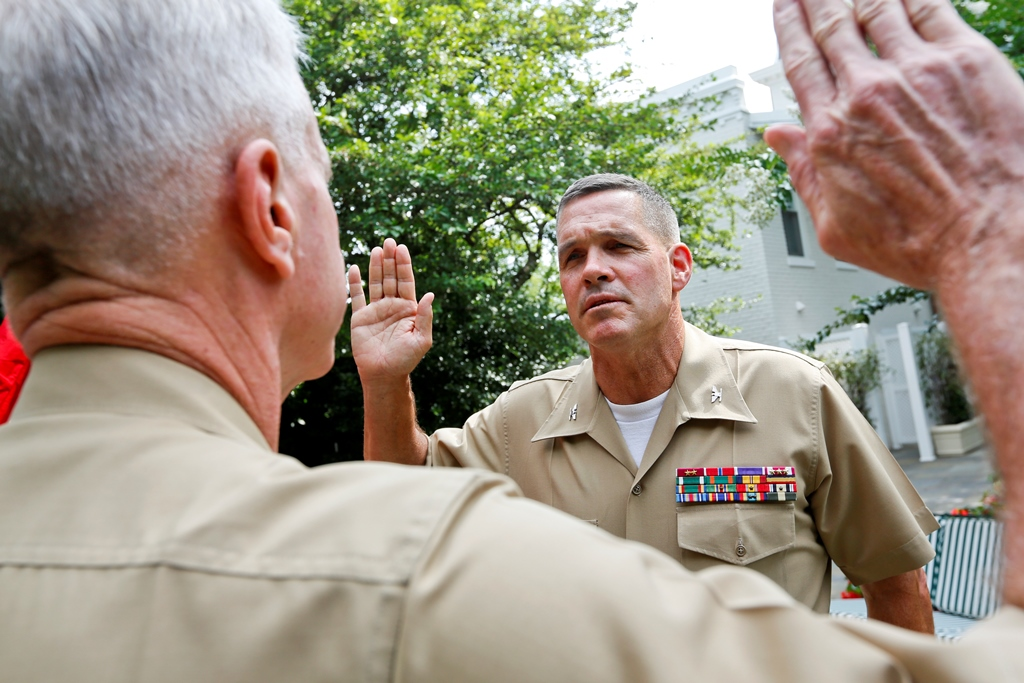
Commandant of the U.S. Marine Corps, Gen. James F. Amos, officiates a promotion ceremony at Washington, D.C., July 2, 2014. Col. John R. Ewers Jr., was nominated for appointment to the rank of major general and as the staff judge advocate to the commandant of the Marine Corps.

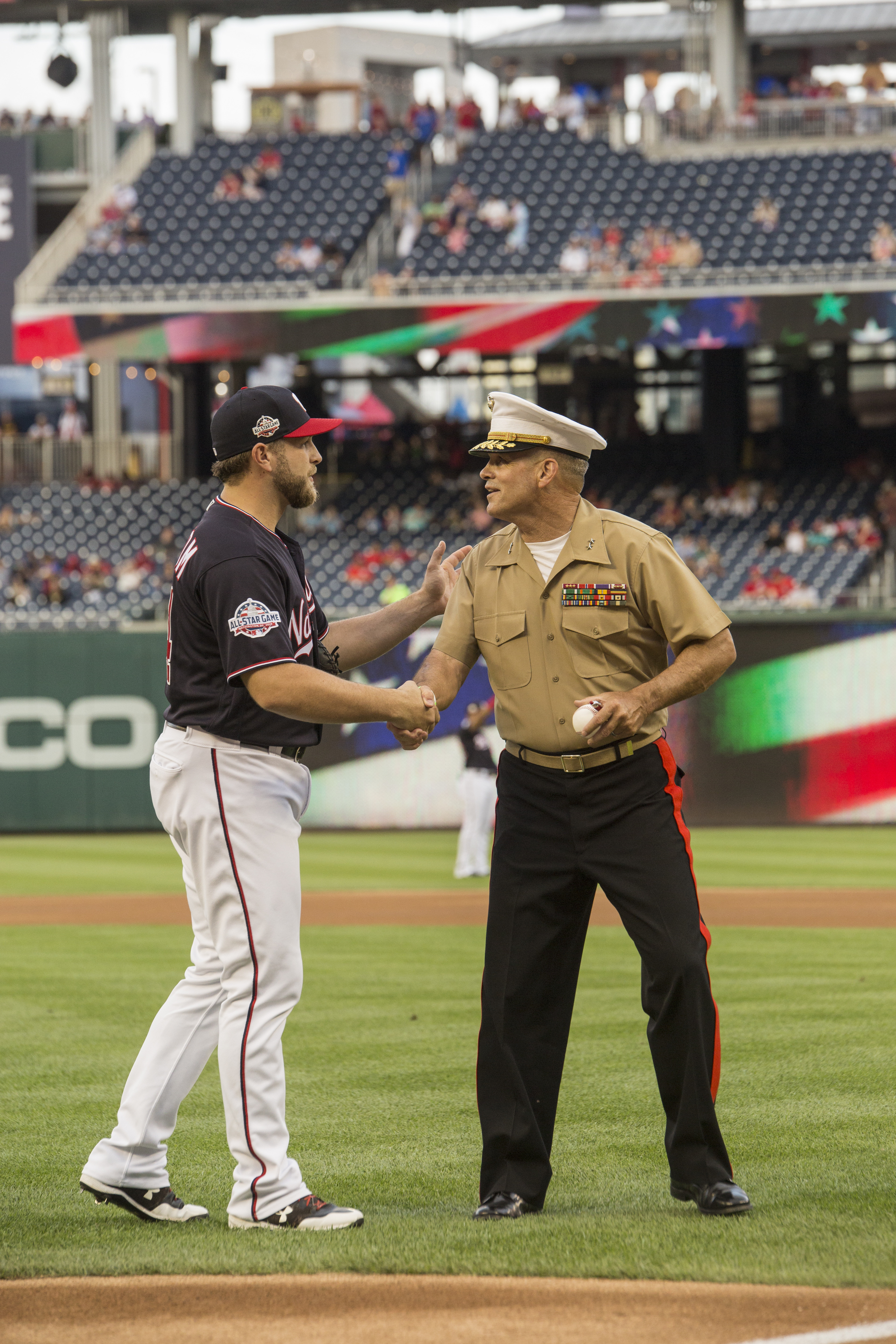
NATIONALS PARK, WASHINGTON D.C. - Major Gen. John R. Ewers Jr., staff judge advocate to the Commandant of the Marine Corps, shakes the hand of Washington Nationals catcher, Spencer Kieboom, during U.S. Marine Corps Day at Nationals Park, Washington D.C., July 31, 2018. The Washington Nationals hosted Marines stationed around the National Capital Region to participate in pre-game events to honor the Marine Corps.

Returning from Iraq in February 2007, he resumed his duties as I MEF SJA until moving back to the judiciary in August 2008 as circuit military judge, Western Judicial Circuit. From April 2010 until August 2011, he was the deputy SJA to the commandant of the Marine Corps before serving as the Department of the Navy’s assistant judge advocate general for military justice. On 2 July 2014, Ewers was promoted to major general and assumed the billet of SJA to the commandant of the Marine Corps.

While serving as the 19th SJA to CMC, MajGen Ewers had the honor of throwing the first pitch at the Washington Nationals baseball game on July 31, 2018.
