= Naval Justice School =

Educational institution of the United States Navy

Coordinates: 41.512858°N 71.321688°W

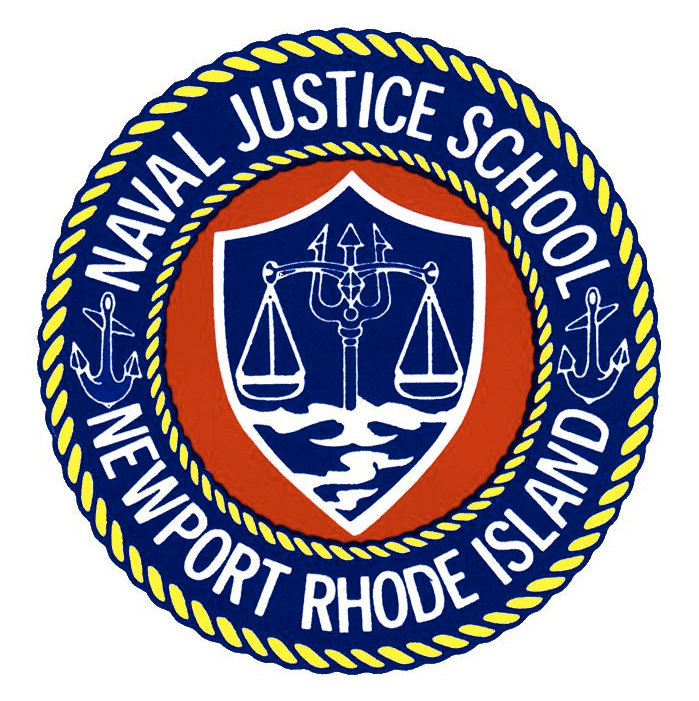
- Type: United States Navy Training Command
- Established: 1946
- Administrative staff: 50
- Students: 150
- Location: Newport, Rhode Island, US
- Campus: Naval Station Newport
- Website: jag.navy.mil/njs.htm

The Naval Justice School (NJS) is an educational institution of the United States Navy whose mission is to instruct Navy, Marine Corps, and Coast Guard officers and enlisted personnel in the fundamental principles of military justice, civil and administrative law, and procedure. In addition to being licensed attorneys in any state or territory of the U.S., all attorneys in the Judge Advocate General's Corps must undergo training either in this institution, or in the complementary institutions of the United States Army and the United States Air Force, allowing them to act as trial or defense counsel at military courts-martial.

The Naval Justice School was founded in 1946 at Port Hueneme, California and moved to Newport, Rhode Island in 1950. It has additional campuses in Norfolk, Virginia and San Diego, California and a branch office in Charlottesville, Virginia. Beginning in 1990, the institution also began instructing U.S. civilians and foreign government officials in human rights law.

== Notable alumni ==
- Russell A. Anderson, Chief Justice of Minnesota Supreme Court
- Duane Benton, Judge of United States Court of Appeals for the Eighth Circuit
- Roberto Feliberti Cintrón, Associate Justice Puerto Rico Supreme Court
- A. Jay Cristol, Judge of the United States Court for the Southern District of Florida
- Ron DeSantis, Governor of Florida
- Albert Diaz, Judge of United States Court of Appeals for the Fourth Circuit
- John M. Dowd, Special Counsel to MLB, Special Counsel to the Special Counsel investigation
- William Benner Enright, Judge of United States District Court for the Southern District of California
- James Knoll Gardner Judge of the United States District Court for the Eastern District of Pennsylvania
- Robert Gammage, Associate Justice of Texas Supreme Court
- Gary Hart, U.S. Senator from Colorado
- Robert Dixon Herman, Judge of the United States District Court for the Middle District of Pennsylvania
- Philip A. Holloway, attorney and nationally recognized legal analyst
- Adam Laxalt, Attorney General of Nevada
- Steven Paul Logan, Judge of the United States District Court for the District of Arizona
- James E. McPherson, United States Under Secretary of the Army
- Matt Michels, Lieutenant Governor of South Dakota
- Kenneth Francis Ripple, Judge of the United States Court of Appeals for the Seventh Circuit
- Mark Salter, Associate Justice of South Dakota Supreme Court
- Matthew T. Schelp, Judge of the United States District Court for the Eastern District of Missouri
- Peter G. Strasser, U.S. Attorney for the Eastern District of Louisiana
- Charles Stimson, Deputy Assistant Secretary of Defense for Detainee Affairs
- Edward G. Smith, Judge of the United States District Court for the Eastern District of Pennsylvania
- Jay Town, U.S. Attorney for the Northern District of Alabama

=== Fictional alumni ===
- Daniel Kaffee, Tom Cruise's lead role in A Few Good Men
- Harmon Rabb, David James Elliott's lead role in JAG
- Bud Roberts, supporting character in JAG
- Sturgis Turner, Scott Lawrence's character in JAG
- Sarah "Mac" MacKenzie, USMC, Catherine Bell's character in JAG

== See also ==
- The Judge Advocate General's Legal Center and School (U.S. Army)
- Air Force Judge Advocate General's School
- U.S. Navy Judge Advocate General's Corps
- U.S. Marine Corps Judge Advocate Division
- U.S. Coast Guard Legal Division
