= USS Fox =

USS Fox may refer to the following ships of the United States Navy:

- A schooner Fox was listed as a United States naval vessel in the period 1817–1821, but no information concerning such a ship is contained in the official manuscript records
- USS Fox (1822), was a schooner commissioned early in 1823
- USS Fox (1859), was a schooner built in 1859
- USS Fox (TB-13), was a torpedo boat commissioned 8 July 1899
- USS Fox (DD-234), later AG-85, was commissioned 17 May 1920
- USS Fox (DLG-33), later CG-33, was commissioned 28 May 1966

== See also ==
- USS Douglas H. Fox (DD-779)
- USS Lee Fox (DE-65), later APD-45
- USS Myles C. Fox, the name of more than one United States Navy ship
- USS Sea Fox (SS-402), later TCG Burakreis (S 335)
