= USS Myles C. Fox =

USS Myles C. Fox has been the name of more than one United States Navy ship, and may refer:

- USS Myles C. Fox (DE-546), a destroyer escort cancelled in 1944
- USS Myles C. Fox (DD-829), a destroyer in commission from 1945 to 1979
