= Independent Battery C, Pennsylvania Light Artillery =

Light artillery battery of the Union Army

Independent Battery "C", Pennsylvania Light Artillery
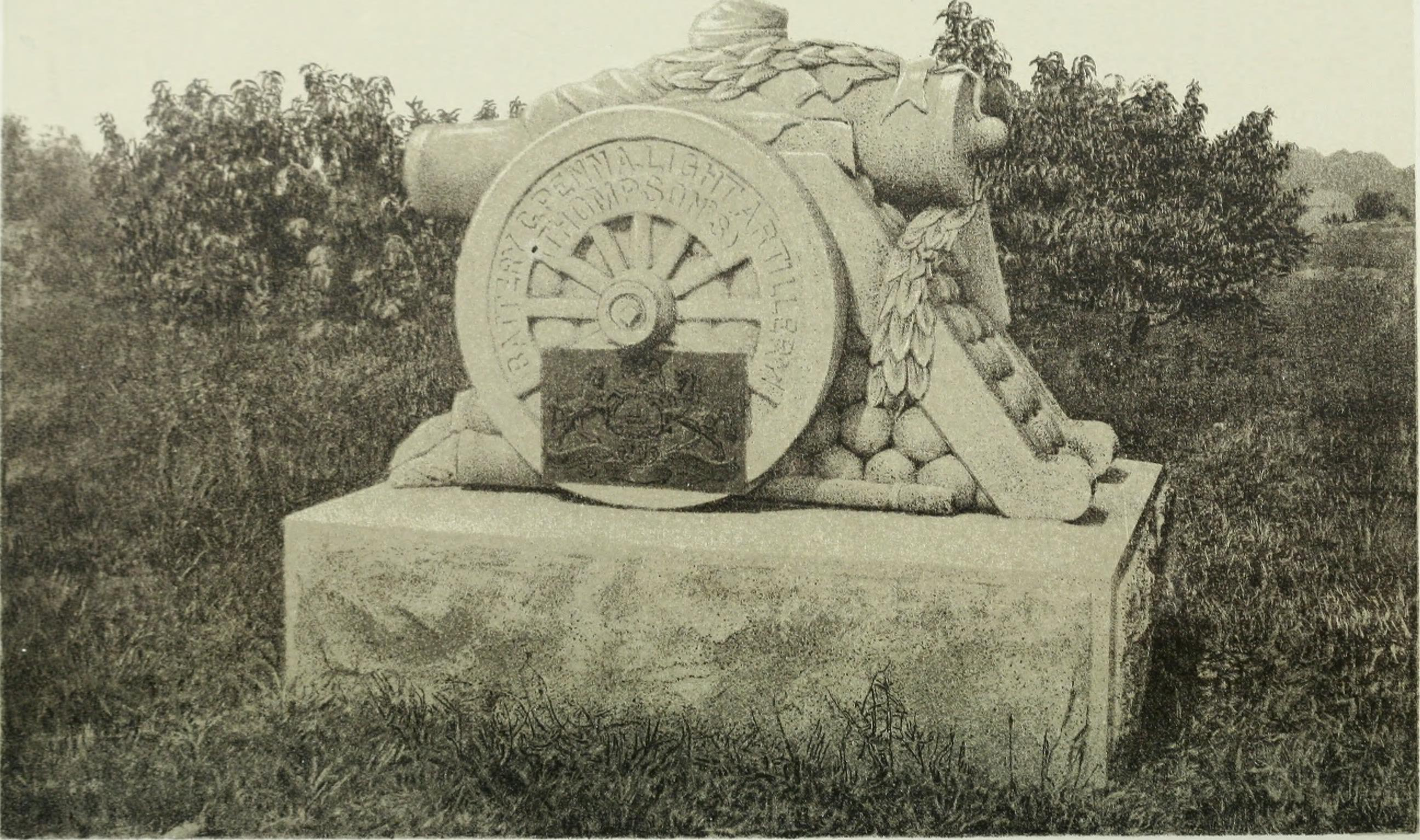
- Monument to Battery C (Thompson's), Independent Pennsylvania Light Artillery at Gettysburg.
- Active: September 1861 to June 30, 1865
- Country: United States
- Allegiance: (United States) Union; Pennsylvania
- Branch: Artillery
- Equipment: 4 3-inch Ordnance rifles (1862)
- Engagements: Battle of Cedar Mountain; Second Battle of Bull Run; Battle of Chantilly; Battle of Antietam; Battle of Fredericksburg; Battle of Chancellorsville; Battle of Gettysburg; Bristoe Campaign; Mine Run Campaign

Commanders
- Notable commanders: James Thompson

Independent Battery "C", Pennsylvania Volunteers was a light artillery battery that served in the Union Army during the American Civil War.

== Service ==
The battery was organized at Pittsburgh, Pennsylvania. It was attached to the regiment being raised by Ward H. Lamon and moved to Williamsport, Md. After the dissolution of Lamon's Brigade it was mustered in for a three-year enlistment on November 6, 1861 under the command of Captain James Thompson.

The battery was attached to Military District of Washington until May 1862. Ord's Division, Department of the Rappahannock, to June 1862. 2nd Division, III Corps, Army of Virginia, to September 1862. 2nd Division, I Corps, Army of the Potomac, to June 1863. 1st Volunteer Brigade, Artillery Reserve, Army of the Potomac, to November 1863. Artillery Brigade, II Corps, Army of the Potomac, to March 1864. Camp Barry, Defenses of Washington, XXII Corps, to June 1865.

Battery C, Pennsylvania Light Artillery mustered out of service on June 30, 1865.

== Detailed service ==
Moved to Washington, D.C., November 1861. Duty in the defenses of Washington, D.C., until May 1862. Duty at Front Royal, Catlett's Station, Warrenton, and Waterloo, until August. Battle of Cedar Mountain August 9. Pope's Campaign in northern Virginia August 10-September 2. Crooked Run August 12. Fords of the Rappahannock August 21–23. Thoroughfare Gap August 28. Second Battle of Bull Run August 29–30. Chantilly September 1. Maryland Campaign September 6–24. Battle of Antietam, Md., September 16–17. Duty at Sharpsburg, Md., until October 30. Movement to Falmouth, Va., October 30-November 19. Battle of Fredericksburg December 12–15. "Mud March" January 20–24, 1863. At Falmouth and Belle Plains until April. Chancellorsville Campaign April 27-May 6. Operations at Pollock's Mill Creek April 29-May 2. Fitzhugh's Crossing April 29–30. Chancellorsville May 2–5. Gettysburg Campaign June 11-July 24. Advance to line of the Rapidan September 13–17. Bristoe Campaign October 9–22. Advance to line of the Rappahannock November 7–8. Mine Run Campaign November 26-December 2. Demonstration on the Rapidan February 6–7, 1864. Morton's Ford February 6–7. Ordered to the defenses of Washington and duty at Camp Barry and in the defenses south of the Potomac River until June 1865.

== Casualties ==
The battery lost a total of 24 men during service: 1 officer and 2 enlisted men killed or mortally wounded, 2 enlisted men died of disease.

== Commanders ==
- Captain James Thompson

== See also ==
- List of Pennsylvania Civil War Units
- Pennsylvania in the Civil War
- Lamon's Brigade
