= 3rd Maryland Infantry Regiment =

3rd Regiment Maryland Volunteer Infantry
- Active: June 18, 1861 – July 31, 1865
- Country: United States
- Allegiance: Union
- Branch: Infantry
- Engagements: Battle of Cedar Mountain; Battle of Antietam; Battle of Chancellorsville; Battle of Gettysburg; Atlanta campaign Battle of Resaca; Battle of Dallas; Battle of New Hope Church; Battle of Allatoona; Battle of Gilgal Church; Battle of Kennesaw Mountain; Battle of Peachtree Creek; Siege of Atlanta; Battle of the Wilderness; Battle of Spotsylvania Court House; Battle of North Anna; Battle of Totopotomoy Creek; Battle of Cold Harbor; Siege of Petersburg; Battle of the Crater; Battle of Globe Tavern; Battle of Boydton Plank Road; Battle of Hatcher's Run; Battle of Fort Stedman; Appomattox Campaign; Third Battle of Petersburg

The 3rd Regiment Maryland Volunteer Infantry was an infantry regiment that served in the Union Army during the American Civil War. It was noted for its holding the high ground at the center of the line at Antietam as part of Stainrook's 2nd Brigade, Greene's 2nd Division of Mansfield's XII Corps.

== Service ==
The 3rd Maryland Infantry was organized at Baltimore and Williamsport, Maryland, beginning June 18, 1861 for a three year enlistment under the command of Colonel John C. McConnell.

The regiment was attached to Dix's Division, Baltimore, Maryland, to May 1862. 1st Brigade, Sigel's Division, Department of the Shenandoah, to June 1862. 2nd Brigade, 2nd Division, II Corps, Pope's Army of Virginia, to August 1862. 1st Brigade, 2nd Division, II Corps, Army of Virginia, to September 1862. 2nd Brigade, 2nd Division, XII Corps, Army of the Potomac, to October 1862. 2nd Brigade, 1st Division, XII Corps, to May 1863. 1st Brigade, 1st Division, XII Corps, Army of the Potomac, to September 1863, and Army of the Cumberland to April 1864. (Non veterans assigned to 1st Brigade, 1st Division, XX Corps, Army of the Cumberland, April to October 1864.) 2nd Brigade, 1st Division, IX Corps, Army of the Potomac, April to June 1, 1864. 1st Brigade, 1st Division, IX Corps, to July 1864. 2nd Brigade, 1st Division, IX Corps, to September 1864. 3rd Brigade, 1st Division, IX Corps, Department of Washington, to July 1865.

The 3rd Maryland Infantry mustered out of the service on July 31, 1865.

== Detailed service ==
Duty at Baltimore, Md., until May 24, 1862. Moved to Harpers Ferry, Va., May 24. Defense of Harpers Ferry May 28–30. Operations in the Shenandoah Valley until August. Battle of Cedar Mountain August 9. Pope's Campaign in northern Virginia August 16-September 2. Fords of the Rappahannock August 21–23. Sulphur Springs August 24. Plains of Manassas August 28–29 (reserve). Second Battle of Bull Run August 30 (reserve). Maryland Campaign September 6–22. Battle of Antietam September 16–17. Duty at Bolivar Heights September 22 to December 10. Reconnaissance to Rippen, Va., November 9. Expedition to Winchester December 2–6. Moved to Fredericksburg December 10–14. At Stafford's Court House December 14, 1862 to April 27, 1863. "Mud March" January 20–24, 1863. Chancellorsville Campaign April 27-May 6. Battle of Chancellorsville May 1–5. Gettysburg Campaign June 11-July 24. Battle of Gettysburg July 1–3. Pursuit of Lee July 5–24. At Raccoon Ford until September. Moved to Brandy Station, then to Bealeton and to Stevenson, Ala., September 24-October 4. Guard duty on the Nashville & Chattanooga Railroad until April, 1864. Veterans on furlough March and April. Old members participated in the Atlanta Campaign May 1 to September 8, 1864. Demonstration on Rocky Faced Ridge May 8–11. Battle of Resaca May 14–15. Near Cassville May 19. Advance on Dallas May 22–25. New Hope Church May 25. Battles about Dallas, New Hope Church, and Allatoona Hills May 26-June 5. Operations about Marietta and against Kennesaw Mountain June 10-July 2. Pine Mountain June 11–14. Lost Mountain June 15–17. Gilgal or Golgotha Church June 15. Muddy Creek June 17. Noyes Creek June 19. Kolb's Farm June 22. Assault on Kennesaw June 27. Ruff's Station, Smyrna Camp Ground, July 4. Chattahoochie River July 5–17. Peachtree Creek July 19–20. Siege of Atlanta July 22-August 25. Operations at Chattahoochie River Bridge August 26-September 2. Occupation of Atlanta September 2. Regiment joined IX Corps, Army of the Potomac, April 1864. Campaign from the Rapidan to the James May 3-June 15. Battle of the Wilderness May 5–7. Spotsylvania May 8–12. Nye River May 10. Spotsylvania Court House May 12–21. Assault on Salient May 12. Ox Ford May 21. North Anna River May 23–26. On line of the Pamunkey May 26–28. Totopotomoy May 28–31. Cold Harbor June 1–12. Bethesda Church June 1–3. Before Petersburg June 16–18. Siege of Petersburg June 16, 1864 to April 2, 1865. Mine Explosion, Petersburg, July 30, 1864. Weldon Railroad August 18–21. Poplar Grove Church September 29-October 2. Boydton Plank Road, Hatcher's Run, October 27–28. Fort Steadman, Petersburg, March 25, 1865. Appomattox Campaign March 28-April 9. Assault on and fall of Petersburg April 2. Occupation of Petersburg April 3. March to Farmville April 3–9. Moved to Petersburg and City Point April 20–24, then to Alexandria April 26–28. Grand Review of the Armies May 23. Duty in the Department of Washington until July.

== Commanders ==
- Colonel John C. McConnell - discharged February 18, 1862
- Colonel David P. DeWitt - discharged October 8, 1862
- Colonel Joseph M. Sudsburg - mustered out June 24, 1864 when the regiment was consolidated to become a battalion
- Lieutenant Colonel Gilbert P. Robinson - commanded at the Battle of Chancellorsville
- Captain John F. Burch - commanded at the Battle of Fort Stedman

== Notable members ==
- Captain Joseph F. Carter, Company D - Medal of Honor recipient for action at the Battle of Fort Stedman
- Sergeant Benjamin F. McAlwee, Company D - Medal of Honor recipient for action at the Battle of the Crater
- Sergeant Major George H. Plowman - Medal of Honor recipient for action at the Second Battle of Petersburg
- Private George Schneider, Company A - Medal of Honor recipient for action at the Battle of the Crater
- 1st Sergeant Bernard A. Strausbaugh, Company A - Medal of Honor recipient for action at the Second Battle of Petersburg where he was mortally wounded

== Casualties ==
The regiment lost a total of 225 men during service; 8 officers and 83 enlisted men killed or mortally wounded, and 4 officers and 130 enlisted men due to disease.

== See also ==
- List of Maryland Civil War Units
- Maryland in the American Civil War
- Lamon's Brigade
