= USS Fox (TB-13) =

Torpedo boat of the United States Navy

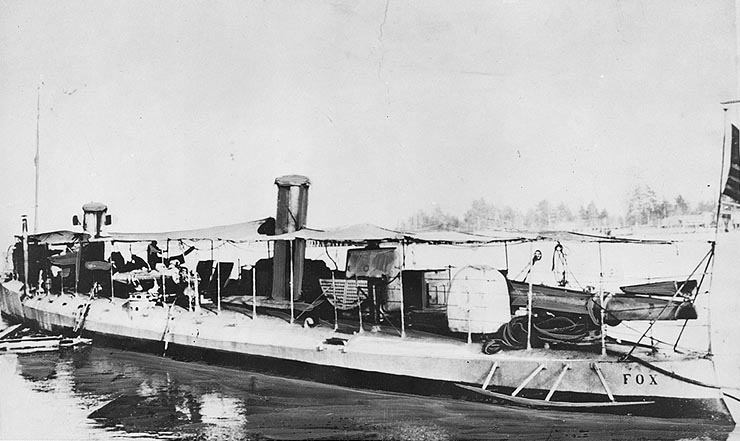
- USS Fox (TB-13) in a West Coast harbor, circa the early 1910s.

History

United States
- Name: Fox
- Namesake: Lieutenant Gustavus Vasa Fox later Assistant Secretary of the Navy
- Ordered: 10 June 1896 (authorised)
- Builder: Wolff & Zwicker, Portland, OR
- Laid down: 4 March 1897
- Launched: 4 July 1898
- Sponsored by: Miss V. Patterson
- Commissioned: 8 July 1899
- Decommissioned: 1916
- Identification: TB-13
- Fate: Sold, 27 October 1916

General characteristics
- Class & type: Davis-class torpedo boat
- Displacement: 154 long tons (156 t)
- Length: 148 ft (45 m)
- Beam: 15 ft 4 in (4.67 m)
- Draft: 5 ft 10 in (1.78 m) (mean)
- Installed power: 2 × Thornycroft boilers; 1,750 ihp (1,300 kW)
- Propulsion: vertical triple expansion engines; 2 × screw propellers
- Speed: 23 knots (43 km/h; 26 mph); 23.13 kn (26.62 mph; 42.84 km/h) (Speed on Trial)
- Complement: 24 officers and enlisted
- Armament: 3 × 1-pounder (37 mm (1.46 in)) guns; 3 × 18 inch (450 mm) torpedo tubes (3x1)

The third USS Fox (Torpedo Boat No. 13/TB-13), was launched 4 July 1898 by Wolff and Zwicker, Portland, Oregon.; sponsored by Miss V. Patterson; and commissioned 8 July 1899.

Based at Mare Island Navy Yard, the pioneer group of torpedo boats, which included Fox, cruised during 1900 only in the immediate area, conducting trials of engines and equipment, and in general, developing their type both in terms of construction and equipment, and tactics. Between 1901 and 1906, Fox was in the yard for installation of torpedo-firing circuits and other work designed to enhance her capabilities. After 2 years in reserve, she was recommissioned 23 March 1908, and based at San Diego for intensive training operations with the Pacific Fleet.

Out of commission between 7 January 1909 and 17 October 1910, when she was commissioned in reserve, Fox returned to full commission between 1 November 1910 and 5 July 1913, although for much of 1911 and 1912 she lay in reserve. While active, she continued her training and experimental operations out of San Diego. From 1913 to 1916, Fox was on loan to the Washington State Naval Militia, based at Aberdeen, Washington. She was sold 27 October 1916. In 1919 her owners planned on converting her into a trawler.
