= Wolff & Zwicker Iron Works =

Ironworks and shipbuilding company

Coordinates: 45°30′44.54″N 122°40′2.03″W

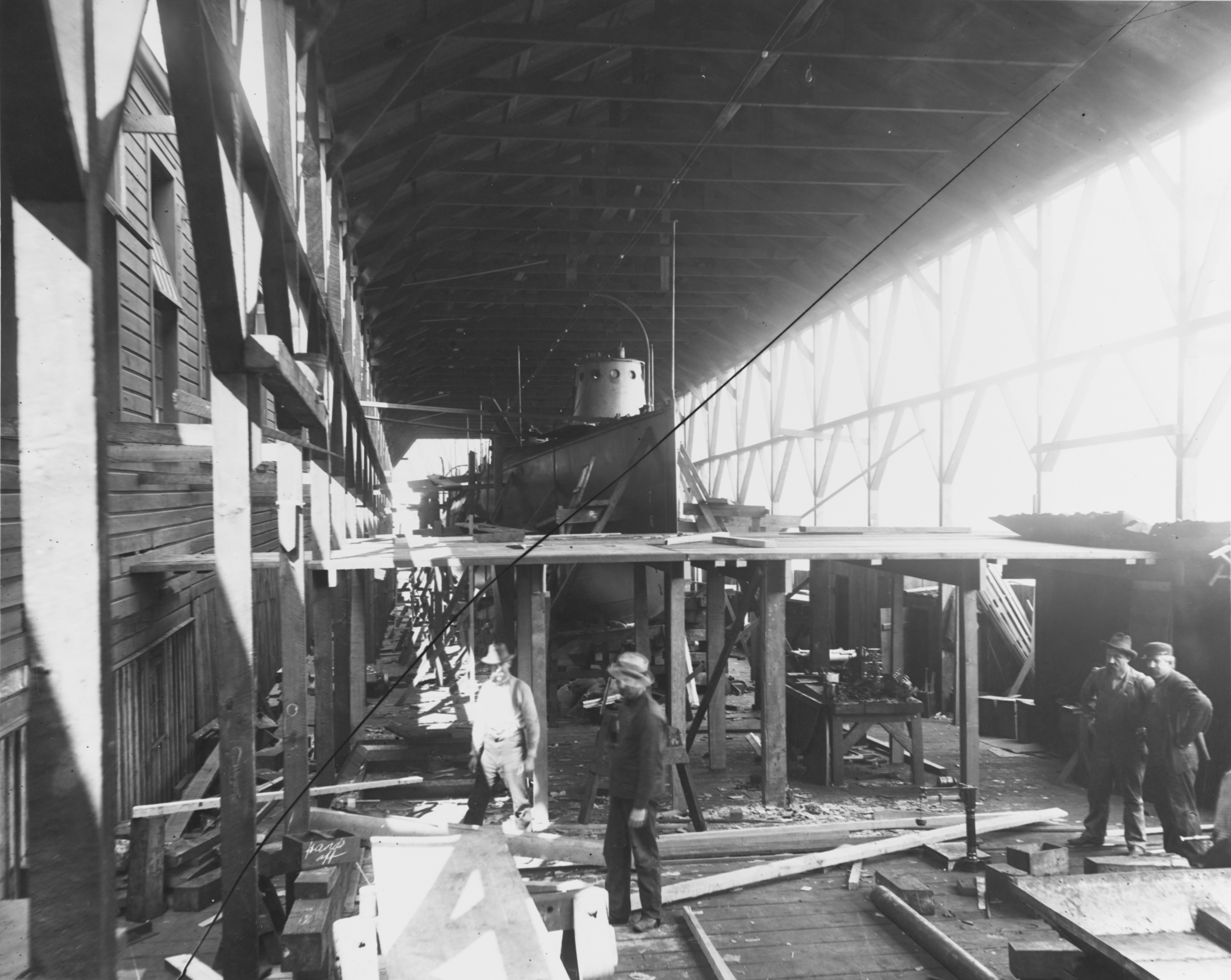
USS Fox (TB-13) at the Wolff & Zwicker Iron Works, Portland, Oregon, probably shortly before she was launched on 4 July 1898.

Wolff & Zwicker Iron Works was an American ironworks and shipbuilding company located in Portland, Oregon from about 1893 until it went into receivership in 1900. Its plant was destroyed by fire on June 22, 1902. It built three of the early torpedo boats, the USS Davis, the USS Fox, and the USS Goldsborough for the United States Navy.
