= Joseph F. Carter =

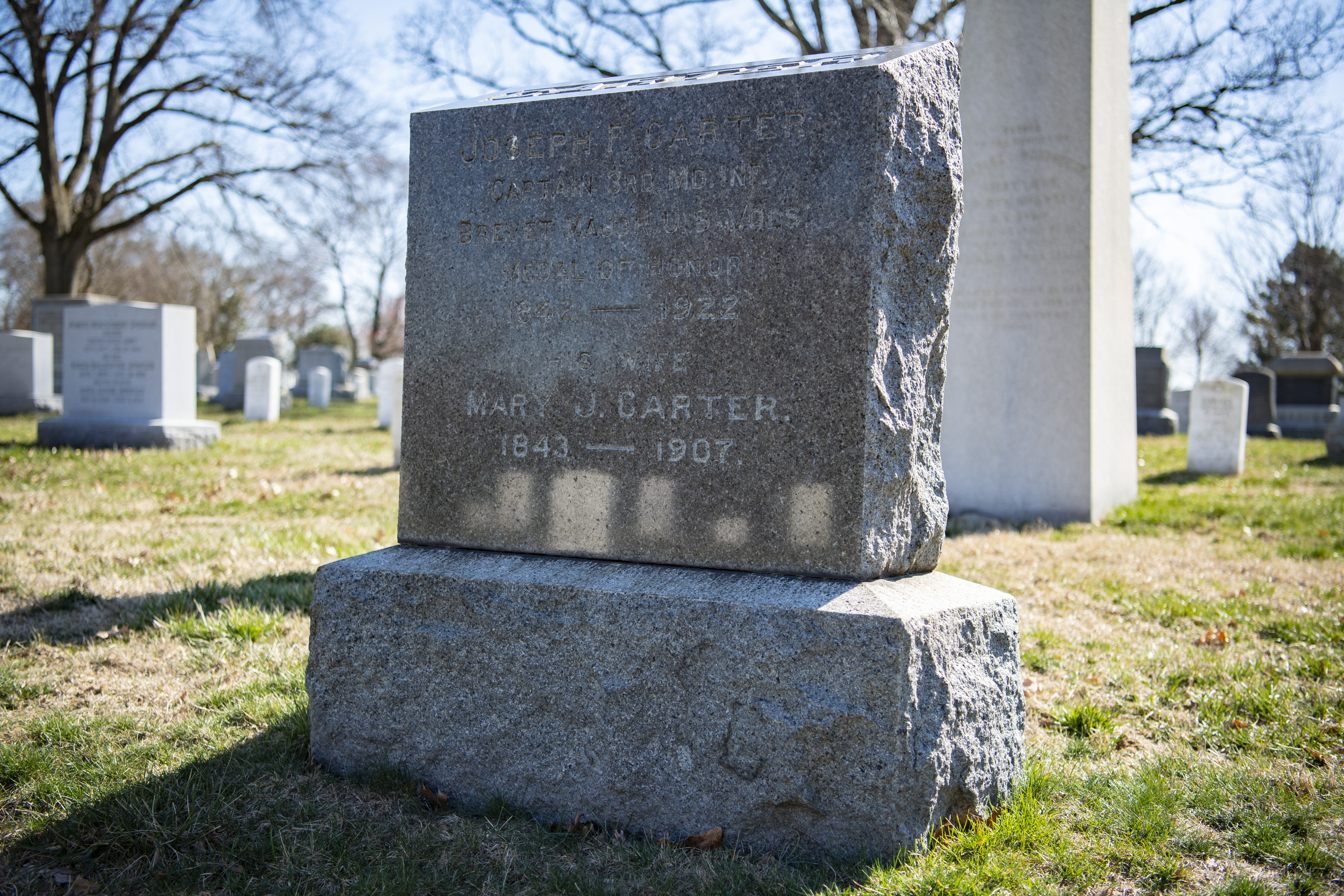
- Grave at Arlinton National Cemetery
- Born: September 11, 1842; Baltimore, Maryland, US
- Died: April 10, 1922 (aged 79); Washington, D.C.
- Burial place: Arlington National Cemetery
- Military career
- Allegiance: United States
- Branch: United States Army; Union Army
- Rank: Captain
- Unit: 3rd Regiment Maryland Volunteer Infantry - Company D
- Conflicts: Battle of Fort Stedman
- Awards: Medal of Honor

Joseph Franklin Carter (September 11, 1842 – April 10, 1922) was an American soldier who fought in the American Civil War. Carter received the country's highest award for bravery during combat, the Medal of Honor, for his action during the Battle of Fort Stedman in Virginia on March 25, 1865. He was awarded the Medal of Honor on July 9, 1891.

== Biography ==
=== Early life ===
Carter was born on 11 September 1842 in Baltimore, Maryland. He came from an old Maryland family. His father, Durus Carter, was a builder and civil engineer who served as a director of the Baltimore and Ohio Railroad in 1857.

=== Military career ===
Carter entered Company D of the 9th Maryland Volunteer Infantry on July 9, 1863, where he was a Second Lieutenant. He was taken prisoner at Charlestown, West Virginia on October 18, 1863, and was sent to Libby Prison in Richmond, Virginia. After about five months in prison, Carter was paroled, and he arrived in Annapolis, Maryland, on March 24, 1864. Carter was mustered out of the 9th Maryland on March 31, 1864, but he reenlisted in Company D of the 3rd Maryland Volunteer Infantry on April 5, 1864. He served as captain and commander of Company D and was awarded the Medal of Honor for his actions on 25 March 1865 at Fort Stedman in Virginia when he successfully captured the battle flag of the 51st Virginia Infantry while also taking a number of Confederate soldiers prisoner. He was later appointed Major of Volunteers by brevet. He was discharged on July 31, 1865.

=== Later life ===
After the war, Carter returned to Baltimore. On January 16, 1866, he married Mary Jane Latchford of Prince George's County, Maryland. Later in 1866, Carter settled near Elkridge, on a farm that his father had purchased in 1862. He was active in the Howard County and Maryland Republican Party for over 30 years. In 1868, he joined the Radical Republican splinter group led by Judge Hugh Lennox Bond. Around 1898, Carter moved to Washington, D.C., where he died on 10 April 1922. His remains are interred at the Arlington National Cemetery along with his wife, Mary J. Carter.

== Medal of Honor citation ==
Captured the colors of the 51st Virginia Infantry (Confederate States of America). During the battle he was captured and escaped bringing a number of prisoners with him.

== See also ==
- List of American Civil War Medal of Honor recipients: A–F
