= Ward Hill Lamon =

Bodyguard of Abraham Lincoln (1828–1893)

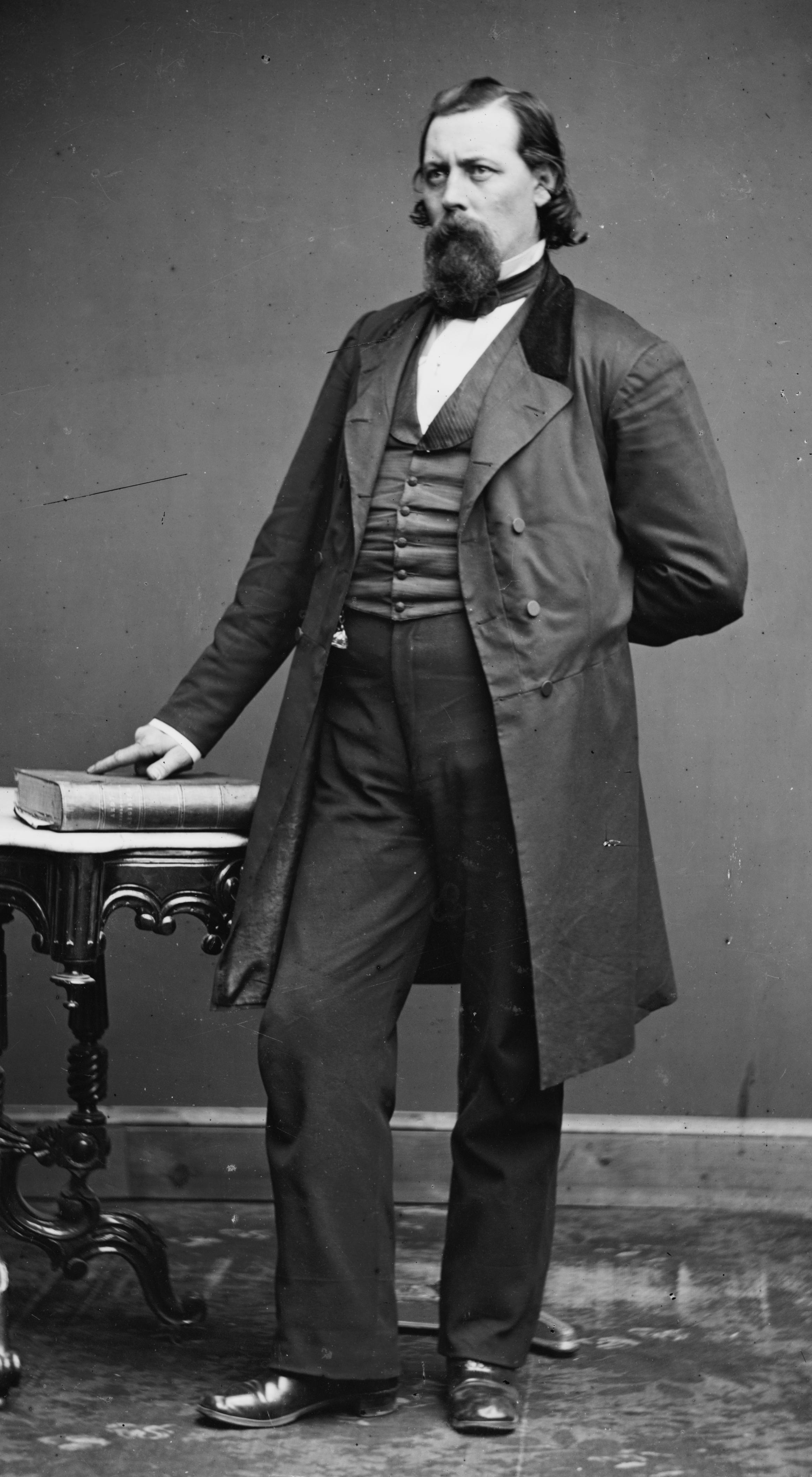
- Lamon c. 1860
- Born: January 6, 1828; Winchester, Virginia, U.S.
- Died: May 7, 1893 (aged 65); Martinsburg, West Virginia, U.S.
- Resting place: Gerrardstown, West Virginia, U.S.
- Education: University of Louisville
- Occupations: Attorney; bodyguard; U.S. Marshal
- Known for: Being the bodyguard of Abraham Lincoln
- Notable work: The Life of Abraham Lincoln; From his Birth to his Inauguration as President
- Spouses: Angelina Turner (m. 1850; died 1859) Sally Logan (m. 1860)
- Children: Dorothy Lamon

Ward Hill Lamon (January 6, 1828 – May 7, 1893) was an American law enforcement officer who was a personal friend and self-appointed bodyguard of U.S. president Abraham Lincoln. Lamon was absent the night Lincoln was assassinated at Ford's Theatre on April 14, 1865, having been sent by Lincoln to Richmond, Virginia.

== Background ==
Lamon's family name was spelled by some relatives with an "e" and by others with an "a", and was pronounced as "lemon" regardless of spelling. Lamon's relationship with Lincoln has been traced by Clint Clay Tilton in Lincoln and Lamon. Lamon was born near Winchester, Virginia, studied medicine for two years, and moved to Danville, Illinois, when he was 19 to live with relatives. He attended the University of Louisville to receive his law degree and was admitted to the Illinois bar in 1851.

In 1850, he moved back to Virginia, married Angelina Turner, and then returned to Illinois to practice law. Angelina was a daughter of Ehud and Priscilla Strode Turner, whose house at Beddington, West Virginia, was listed on the National Register of Historic Places in 2002 as the Priscilla Strode Turner House. Angelina died in April 1859, leaving a daughter, Dorothy, who was raised in Danville by Lamon's sister, Mrs. William Morgan.

In November 1860, Lamon married Sally Logan, daughter of Judge Stephen T. Logan. Logan had been Lincoln's law partner from 1841 to 1844.

== Early years with Lincoln ==
Lamon's professional association with Lincoln started in 1852. Lamon became the prosecuting attorney for the Old Eighth Judicial district and moved to Bloomington, Illinois, in 1858. While Lamon had Southern sympathies and his hatred of abolitionism set him apart from Lincoln, they remained friends, despite their very different characters.

Lamon joined the then-young Republican Party and campaigned for Lincoln in 1860. Lincoln was up against New York Senator William Seward for the Republican nomination. Lamon proved his friendship by printing up extra tickets for the convention to fill the hall with Lincoln supporters.

When Lincoln was elected president, Lamon hoped for a foreign diplomatic post but received a letter from his friend that said, "Dear Hill, I need you. I want you to go to Washington with me and be prepared for a long stay." Lamon then accompanied him as he traveled from Springfield, Illinois, to Washington D.C. in February 1861. This trip proved to be eventful.

== Lamon and the Baltimore Plot, 1861 ==
Lamon was a physically imposing man, and during the presidency, often took it upon himself to guard Lincoln. In February 1861, detective Allan Pinkerton uncovered a plot whereby Lincoln would be assassinated when he arrived in Baltimore, on his way to his inauguration in Washington. Pinkerton advised Lincoln that rather than ride publicly through the city between train stations as planned, he should take a midnight train straight through to Washington. Lamon was the sole friend chosen to accompany him.

Lamon and Pinkerton famously clashed over the President-elect's protection. Lamon offered Lincoln "a Revolver and a Bowie Knife" but Pinkerton protested that he "would not for the world have it said that Mr. Lincoln had to enter the national Capital armed". The two men further disagreed over Lamon's desire to alert the Chicago Journal to their early arrival in Washington because Pinkerton, more prudently, wished not to publicize their change of plans. In Pinkerton's account of the plot, he wrote disparagingly of Lamon, referring to him as a "brainless, egotistical fool".

Pinkerton allowed William Herndon to copy his report, which was obtained by Lamon when he purchased Herndon's papers to write his Life of Abraham Lincoln. When Herndon first requested copies of Pinkerton's report, Pinkerton agreed only on the condition that certain material be kept confidential, specifically naming his remarks about Lamon.

Lincoln was secreted through Baltimore during the night. The train carrying Mrs. Lincoln and others went through Baltimore unharmed the next day, despite the claim of Pinkerton that hand grenades and firebombs would be used to attack the train.

Lamon summed up his disbelief in the plot in the biography: "It is perfectly manifest that there was no conspiracy, – no conspiracy of a hundred, of fifty, of twenty, of three; no definite purpose in the heart of even one man to murder Mr. Lincoln in Baltimore."

== Lamon as U.S. Marshal and his relationship with Lincoln 1861–1865 ==
Shortly after his inauguration in 1861, Lincoln appointed Lamon United States Marshal of the District of Columbia. He resigned his commission in June 1865. One of Lamon's first acts as Marshal was to visit Fort Sumter, South Carolina in March 1861, to meet with Major Robert Anderson, commander of the fort, and Governor Francis Pickens. Reports vary on Lamon's responsibilities with regard to that visit.

One account chronicles that Lamon was just one of a few emissaries sent by Lincoln, the first being Captain Gustavus Fox, who went to determine if Fort Sumter could be relieved by sea. Lamon was sent concurrently with another Illinois friend of Lincoln's, Stephen Hurlbut, with the implication that Lamon was sent to take the focus off of Hurlbut's visit, as Hurlbut was there to measure anti-Union sentiment in Charleston. He discovered it was high. Lamon incurred Lincoln's displeasure by meeting with Governor Pickens and informing him of the government's interest in withdrawing from Fort Sumter.

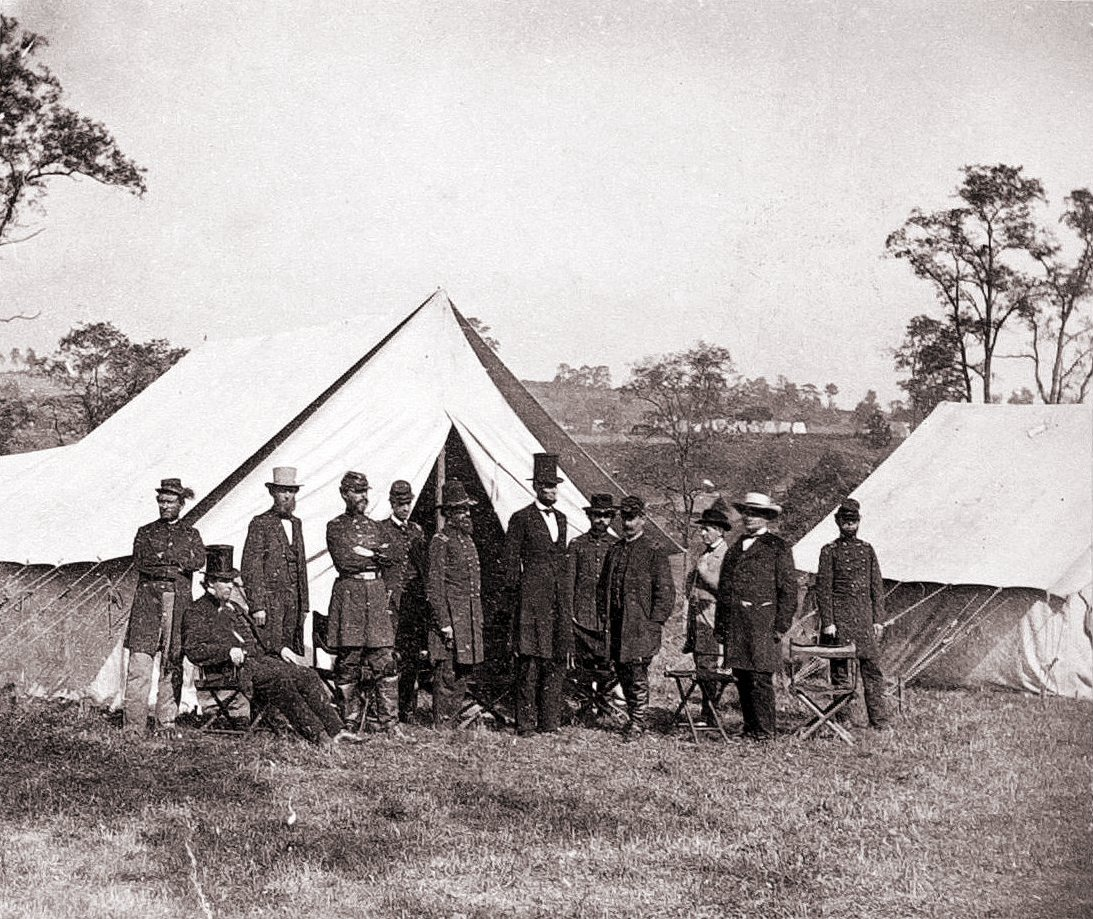
Lamon seated at left with Lincoln at Antietam, October 1862

Another account represents Lamon as traveling with the full confidence of Lincoln: "It called for courage and the trip was made over the objection of Secretary Seward. 'Mr. Secretary,' said Lincoln, 'I have known to be in many a close place and he's never been in one he didn't get out of. By Jing. I'll risk it. Go, Lamon and God bless you.'"

Another account characterizes Lamon as being under Seward's influence and angering Lincoln: "It was under Seward's influence that he actually told Governor Pickens that he had come to arrange for the withdrawal of the garrison, and that after his return he wrote the governor that he would be back in a few days to assist with the evacuation. He also gave Major Anderson the impression that no relief would be attempted. All this was outrageous, and when Lincoln heard of Lamon's letter to Pickens, he indignantly denied that the man possessed any authority to make such a statement."

Missions to Fort Sumter aside, the marshal's position was not an onerous one and afforded Lamon legitimate access to the President. What Lamon took upon himself, was to represent himself as Lincoln's bodyguard, which he did out of friendship rather than the requirements of the position.

Lamon took this so seriously that his friend Leonard Swett recounted that in the three months he stayed with Lamon in the Fall of 1864, he saw Lamon leave every night to go to the White House where he patrolled the grounds. Presidential secretary John Hay adds to this portrait of devotion by noting in his diary that one night he observed Lamon wrap himself up in his cloak and lie down to sleep in front of Lincoln's bedroom door. Lamon was not in Washington on the night of Lincoln's assassination, being on assignment in Richmond. In his Recollections of Abraham Lincoln, Lamon reveals that before he left for Richmond, he implored the President not to "go out at night after [he] was gone, particularly to the theatre." After the assassination, Lamon accompanied the funeral procession to Springfield, Illinois.

== Lamon as Lincoln's biographer ==
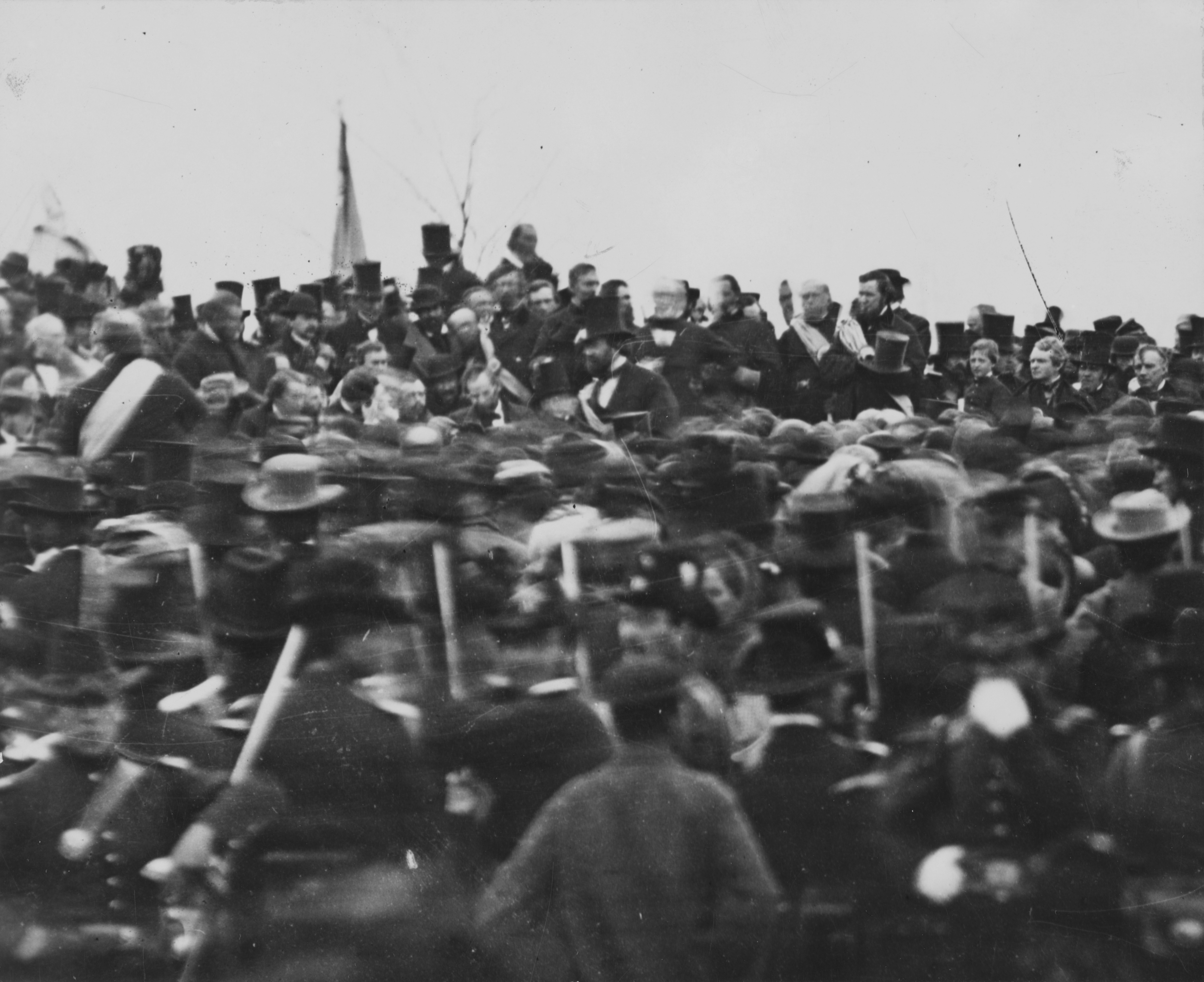
Abraham Lincoln at Gettysburg, seated center. Lamon is seated to Lincoln's right.

After Lincoln's death, Lamon published two books about the late President, one posthumously. The more famous of the two is a biography that was largely ghostwritten by Chauncey Black, the son of former Attorney General of the United States Jeremiah Black. The elder Black was Lamon's law partner from 1865 until 1879. The book, published in 1872 by James R. Osgood and Company of Boston under the title The Life of Abraham Lincoln; From his Birth to his Inauguration as President, contained allegations and personal information about Lincoln that were deemed scandalous by nineteenth century society.

It was a financial failure. One of the most shocking claims was that Lincoln was not a man of faith: "Mr. Lincoln was never a member of any church, nor did he believe in the divinity of Christ, or the inspiration of the Scriptures in the sense understood by evangelical Christians." The basis of the book was the papers of William Herndon, which Lamon purchased for either $2,000 or $4,000.

Shortly after his death, Lamon's daughter collected and edited many of his unpublished writings about Lincoln into a biography of the president, Recollections of Abraham Lincoln (1895). In Recollections, Lamon reversed his earlier denial of the Baltimore plot of 1861, writing, "It is now an acknowledged fact that there was never a moment from the day he crossed the Maryland line, up until the time of his assassination, that he was not in danger of death by violence, and that his life was spared until the night of the 14th of April, 1865, only through the ceaseless and watchful care of the guards thrown around him." The authenticity of this book is generally more highly regarded by the scholarly community than is the earlier volume by Lamon and Black.

According to Lamon, three days before he was shot, Lincoln related a dream in which he wandered the White House searching for the source of mournful sounds:

I kept on until I arrived at the East Room, which I entered. There I met with a sickening surprise. Before me was a catafalque, on which rested a corpse wrapped in funeral vestments. Around it were stationed soldiers who were acting as guards; and there was a throng of people, gazing mournfully upon the corpse, whose face was covered, others weeping pitifully. "Who is dead in the Governers' Mansion?" I demanded of one of the soldiers, "The President," was his answer; "he was killed by an assassin."

Lincoln later told Lamon that "In this dream it was not me, but some other fellow, that was killed. It seems that this ghostly assassin tried his hand on someone else." Although perpetuated by various authors, historians Don E. Fehrenbacher and Virginia Fehrenbacher have cited internal inconsistencies and external evidence regarding Lamon's account that lead them to question its veracity. Lamon stated that the incident had occurred only a few days prior to the assassination, yet within Lincoln's monologue he related at one point that the dream occurred "the other night" and also "about ten days ago."

The Fehrenbachers note that although Lincoln stated in the account that on the night of the dream he "had been up waiting for important dispatches from the front," during the period of March 24 to April 9, he had been at the front, rather than in the White House. There was no contemporaneous account of the dream following the assassination. No one mentioned it in the voluminous writings of the period, not Mary Lincoln, Lamon, anyone else at the supposed telling of the dream, or anyone to whom those who heard it may have relayed it.

== Later life and death ==
Lamon had tendered his resignation as Marshal of the District of Columbia in June 1865. In April 1866, Lamon purchased the funeral rail car that transported Lincoln's remains to Springfield, Illinois. The price he paid for the rail car was a little less than $10,000. He was offered the cabinet position of Postmaster General but declined.

He formed his law partnership with Jeremiah Black (referenced above). The law practice dissolved in 1879 due to the poor reception of The Life of Lincoln ghostwritten by Black's son Chauncey. In 1879, Lamon and his wife Sally moved to Boulder, Colorado, and later to Denver where he formed a friendship with poet Eugene Field. The ill health of both Lamon and Sally caused them to return to Washington in 1886. In 1889, they traveled to Europe for the spas. Sally died in Brussels in 1892.

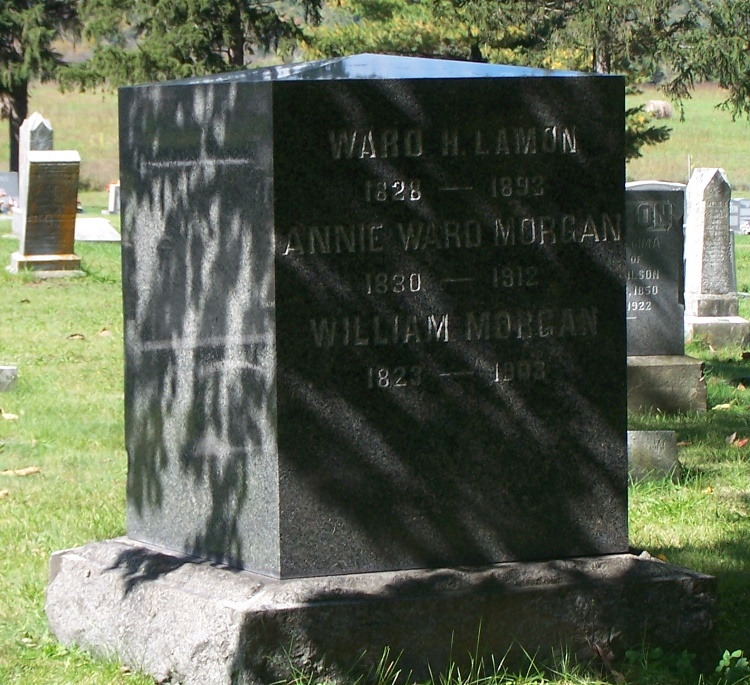
Lamon's grave in Gerrardstown, West Virginia.

Lamon moved to Martinsburg, West Virginia, where he was cared for by his daughter Dorothy until his death on May 7, 1893. He was 65 years old. Lamon was buried in Gerrardstown, West Virginia, in the Presbyterian Cemetery. Sally was buried in Springfield, Illinois. The home built by Lamon's cousin Joseph in Danville, Illinois, has become a museum.

== Perceptions of Lamon ==
Some contemporaries and biographers of Lincoln tend to treat Lamon with a certain casual contempt. In 1862, during his tenure as Marshal, a number of senators called for his removal from office. Although Lincoln refused this demand, the Senate was able to decrease some of Lamon's official duties and thus reduce his income. Allan Pinkerton's opinion of him was voiced above, during the Baltimore Plot. Historian Allan Nevins in The War for the Union characterizes Lamon as "a big loquacious bumbler of more self-assurance than discretion".

Even one of Nevin's footnotes that discusses the controversial trip to Charleston in 1861 further dismisses Lamon: "Lamon's papers in the Huntington Library throw no light on the subject except to confirm his general ineptness." Some accounts are more sympathetic to Lamon. In 1931, Clint Clay Tilton repeatedly affirmed Lamon's generosity and good humor and dubbed him "the Cavalier". When Lamon campaigned for Lincoln's re-election in 1864, a song was written which included the following verse:

A great good man is Ward Hill Lamon;
Abe is Pythias; he is Damon;
He's the President's protector,
He's his political protector,
Who?
Ward Hill Lamon. Ward Hill Lamon.

The tune to this song has been lost to history. The unusual metrical pattern is compatible with Stille Nacht, the tune for "Silent Night."

== Portrayals ==
- Lamon is portrayed by actor Lea Coco in the 2013 film, Saving Lincoln.
- Lamon is portrayed by actor Sam Elliott in the 2015 documentary film The Gettysburg Address.

== See also ==
- Lamon's Brigade
- William H. Crook
