= Gustavus Fox =

1st United States Assistant Secretary of the Navy from 1861 to 1866

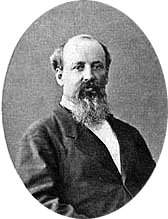
- Fox in August 1866

1st Assistant Secretary of the Navy
- In office August 1, 1861 – November 26, 1866
- President: Abraham Lincoln Andrew Johnson
- Preceded by: Position established
- Succeeded by: William Faxon

Personal details
- Born: Gustavus Vasa Fox; June 13, 1821 Saugus, Massachusetts
- Died: October 29, 1883 (aged 62) New York City, New York
- Resting place: Rock Creek Cemetery, Washington, D.C.
- Spouse: Virginia Woodbury Fox
- Relations: Montgomery Blair
- Children: none
- Education: Phillips Academy

Military service
- Allegiance: United States
- Branch/service: United States Navy
- Years of service: 1838–1856
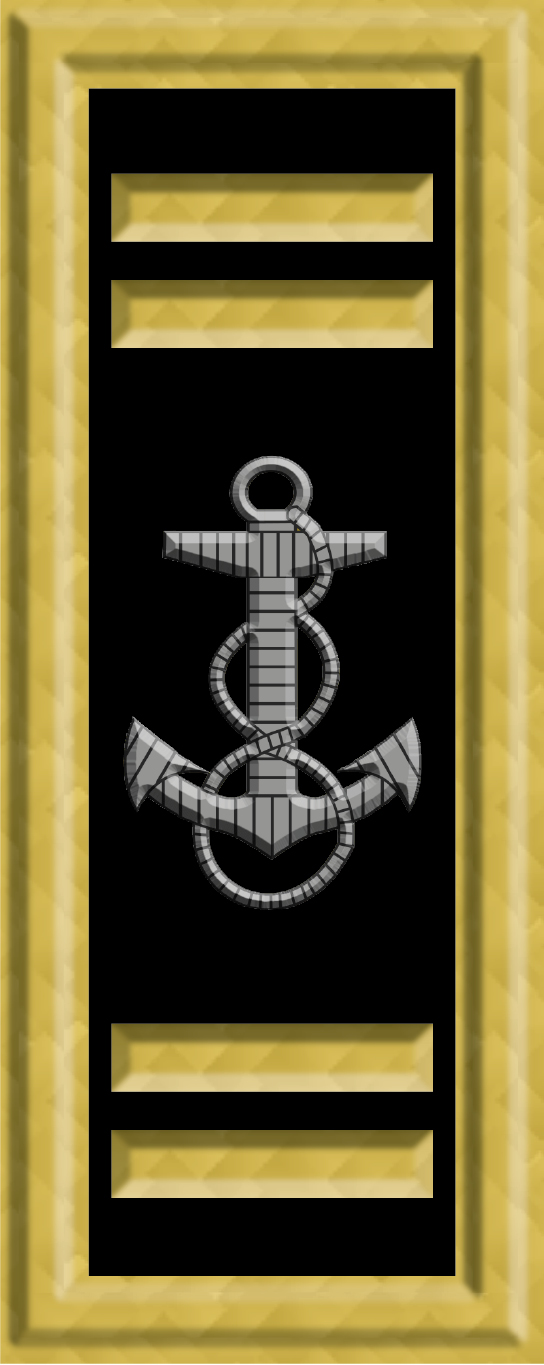
- Rank: Lieutenant
- Battles/wars: Mexican-American War

Gustavus Vasa Fox (June 13, 1821 – October 29, 1883) was an officer of the United States Navy, who served during the Mexican–American War, and as the first Assistant Secretary of the Navy during the Civil War.

== Life and career ==
Fox was born at Saugus, Massachusetts, and his parents named him after Swedish King Gustav I, also known as Gustav (or Gustavus) Vasa. His parents, Dr. Jesse Fox and Olivia Fox (née Flint) were not Swedish American, and may have been inspired to name their son after Gustav I by Henry Brooke's popular play Gustavus Vasa: The Deliveror Of His Country. Fox attended Lowell High School Lowell, Massachusetts from 1836 to 1838.

On January 12, 1838, Fox was appointed midshipman. During the Mexican–American War, he served in the brig Washington in the squadron of Commodore Matthew Perry, and took part in the capture of Tabasco, Mexico, on January 14–16, 1847. He later commanded several mail steamers. On October 29, 1855 Fox married Virginia Lafayette Woodbury, daughter of Levi and Elizabeth Woodbury. Levi Woodbury was the Governor of New Hampshire, United States Senator and Associate Justice of the Supreme Court of the United States. The couple had no children. However her sister married Montgomery Blair and their son, Montgomery Jr became later their heir. He resigned from the Navy on July 30, 1856, and engaged in the manufacture of woolen materials.

At the start of the American Civil War he volunteered for service. President Abraham Lincoln gave him a temporary appointment in the Navy and sent him in the steamer Baltic to the relief of Fort Sumter. Fox could not relieve the fort before Confederate bombardment forced its surrender, but afterwards he brought away the garrison.

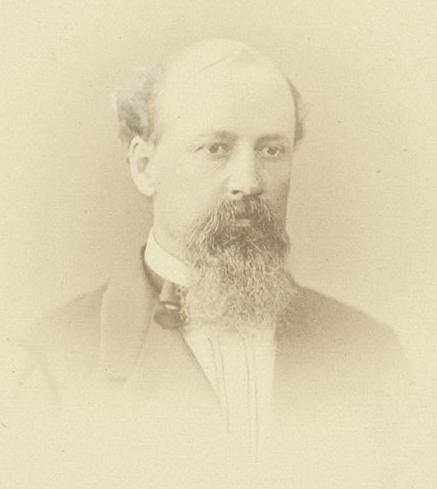
Gustavus V. Fox

On August 1, 1861, Lincoln appointed him Assistant Secretary of the Navy, an office which he held until the close of the Civil War. In 1866, he was sent on a special mission to Russia; he conveyed the congratulations of the President to Tsar Alexander II upon his escape from assassination. His voyage was made in the monitor Miantonomoh, which was the first vessel of this class to cross the Atlantic. They were accompanied by Augusta.

In 1882 he published a paper suggesting that Samana Cay in the Bahamas was Guanahani, or San Salvador, the first island Christopher Columbus reached in his discovery of the Americas. Little attention was paid to his paper until 1986, when the National Geographic Society also concluded that Samana Cay was San Salvador.

He died at Lowell, Massachusetts, aged 62.

== Tributes and legacy ==
Three ships of the US Navy – TB-13, DD-234 and CG-33 – have been named USS Fox in his memory.

== In popular culture ==
Fox is one of the primary viewpoint characters in novelist Harry Harrison's alternate history Stars and Stripes trilogy.

== Publications ==
- Fox, Gustavus V. (1882), An Attempt to Solve the Problem of the First Landing Place of Columbus in the New World. Report of the Superintendent of the U. S. Coast and Geodetic Survey (Appendix No. 18, June 1880), Washington: Government Printing Office.

Government offices
Preceded by None	Assistant Secretary of the Navy; August 1, 1861 – November 26, 1866	Succeeded by William Faxon
