= USS Goldsborough (TB-20) =

Torpedo boat of the United States Navy

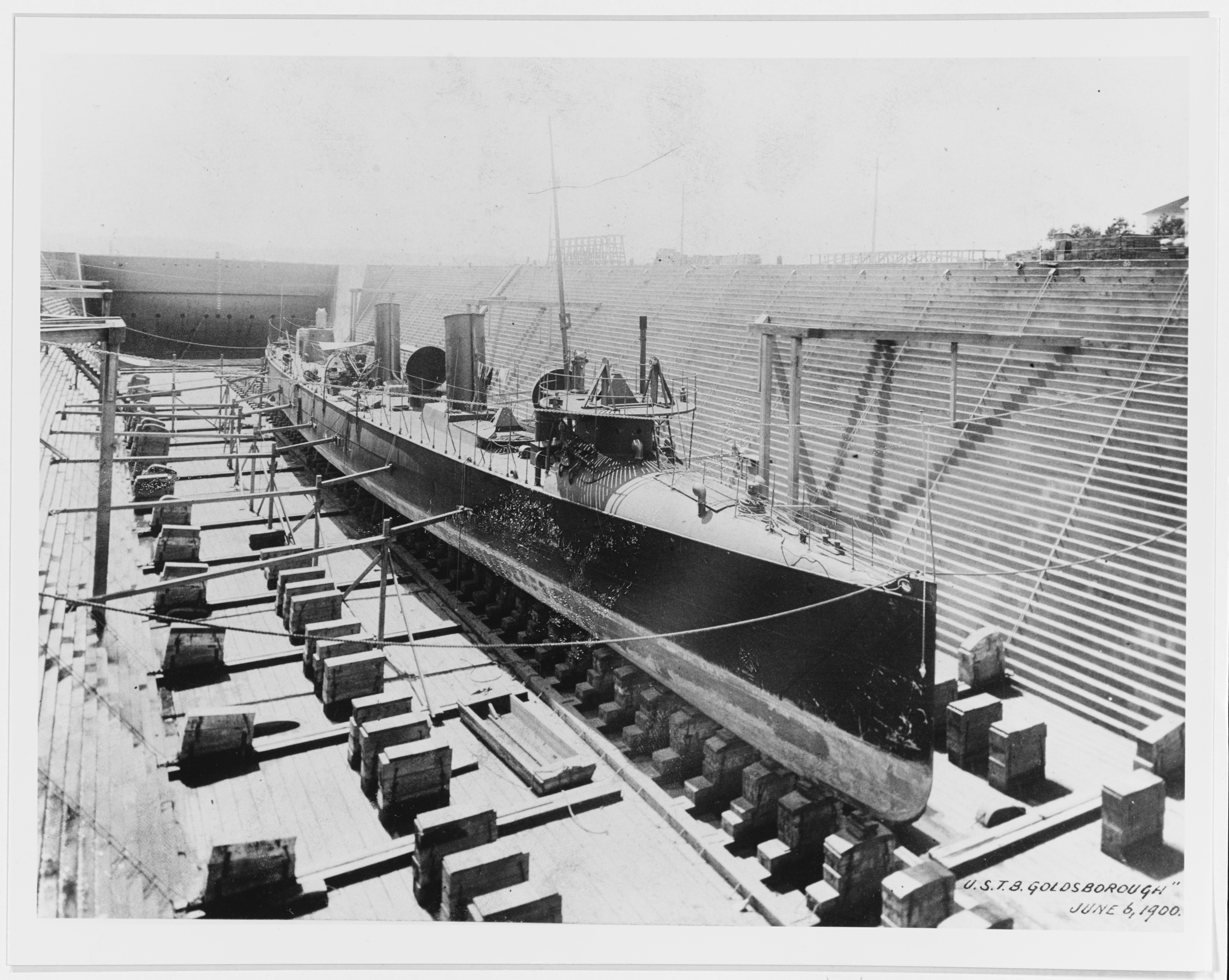
- USS Goldsborough (TB-20), in drydock, 6 June 1900.

History

United States
- Name: Goldsborough
- Namesake: Rear Admiral Louis M. Goldsborough
- Ordered: 3 March 1897 (authorised)
- Builder: Wolff & Zwicker Iron Works, Portland, OR
- Laid down: 14 July 1898
- Launched: 29 July 1899
- Sponsored by: Miss Gertrude Ballin
- Commissioned: 9 April 1908
- Decommissioned: 12 March 1919
- Renamed: Coast Torpedo Boat No. 7, 1 August 1918
- Fate: Sold for scrapping, 8 September 1919

General characteristics
- Class & type: Goldsborough-class torpedo boat
- Displacement: 255 long tons (259 t)
- Length: 198 ft (60 m)
- Beam: 20 ft 7 in (6.27 m)
- Draft: 6 ft 10 in (2.08 m) (mean)
- Installed power: 3 × Thornycroft boilers; 6,000 ihp (4,500 kW)
- Propulsion: vertical triple expansion engine; 2 × screw propellers
- Speed: 27 knots (50 km/h; 31 mph); 27.4 kn (31.5 mph; 50.7 km/h) (Speed on Trial)
- Complement: 59 officers and enslisted
- Armament: 4 × 6-pounder (57 mm (2.24 in)) guns; 2 × 18-inch (450 mm) torpedo tubes (2x1)

The first USS Goldsborough (Torpedo Boat No. 20/TB-20/Coast Torpedo Boat No. 7) was a torpedo boat in the United States Navy during World War I. She was named for Louis M. Goldsborough.

Goldsborough was launched 29 July 1899 by the Wolff & Zwicker Iron Works, Portland, Oregon; sponsored by Miss Gertrude Ballin; commissioned in the Puget Sound Navy Yard 9 April 1908.

Goldsborough based at San Diego, California, as a unit of the Pacific Torpedo Fleet, cruising for six years along the coast of California and the Pacific Coast of Mexico in a schedule of torpedo practice, and joint fleet exercises and maneuvers. She was placed in ordinary at the Mare Island Navy Yard 26 March 1914; served the Oregon State Naval Militia at Portland (December 1914-April 1917); and again fully commissioned 7 April 1917 for Pacific coast patrol and training new sailors throughout World War I.

She was designated Coast Torpedo Boat No. 7 on 1 August 1918, her name being assigned to a new destroyer under construction. The torpedo boat decommissioned in the Puget Sound Navy Yard, Bremerton, Washington, 12 March 1919 and sold for scrapping on 8 September 1919.
