= George H. Plowman =

American Civil War soldier and Medal of Honor recipient

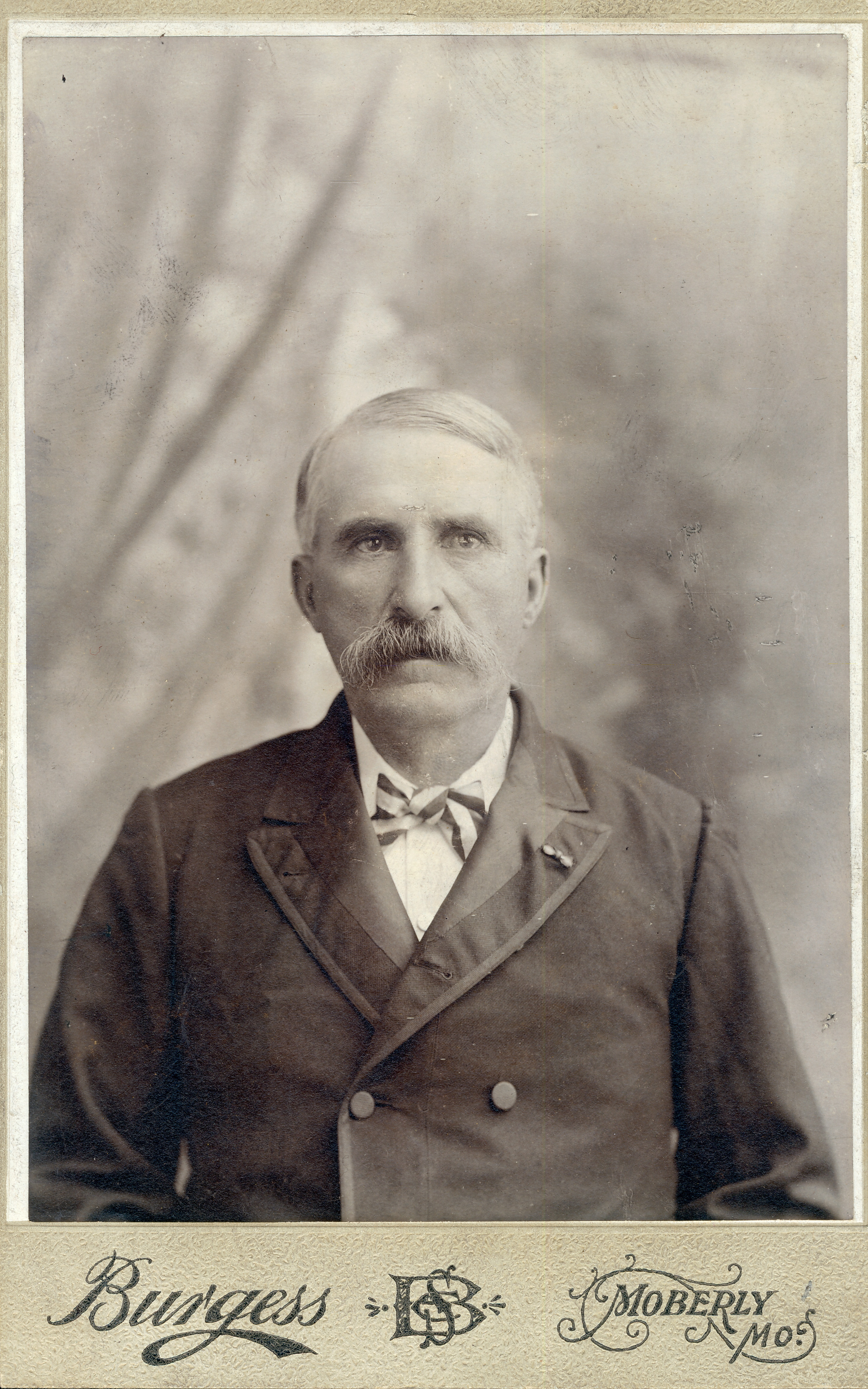
- Born: March 10, 1840; Oxford, England
- Died: February 27, 1921 (aged 80); Woodward, Oklahoma
- Burial place: Arlington National Cemetery
- Military career
- Allegiance: United States of America
- Branch: United States Army; Union Army
- Service years: 1862 - 1865
- Rank: Captain
- Unit: 3rd Maryland Volunteer Infantry
- Conflicts: Second Battle of Petersburg; American Civil War
- Awards: Medal of Honor

George H. Plowman (March 10, 1840 – February 27, 1921) was an American soldier who fought in the American Civil War. Plowman received his country's highest award for bravery during combat, the Medal of Honor. Plowman's medal was won for recapturing the colors of the 2d Pennsylvania Provisional Artillery during the Second Battle of Petersburg. He was honored with the award on December 1, 1864.

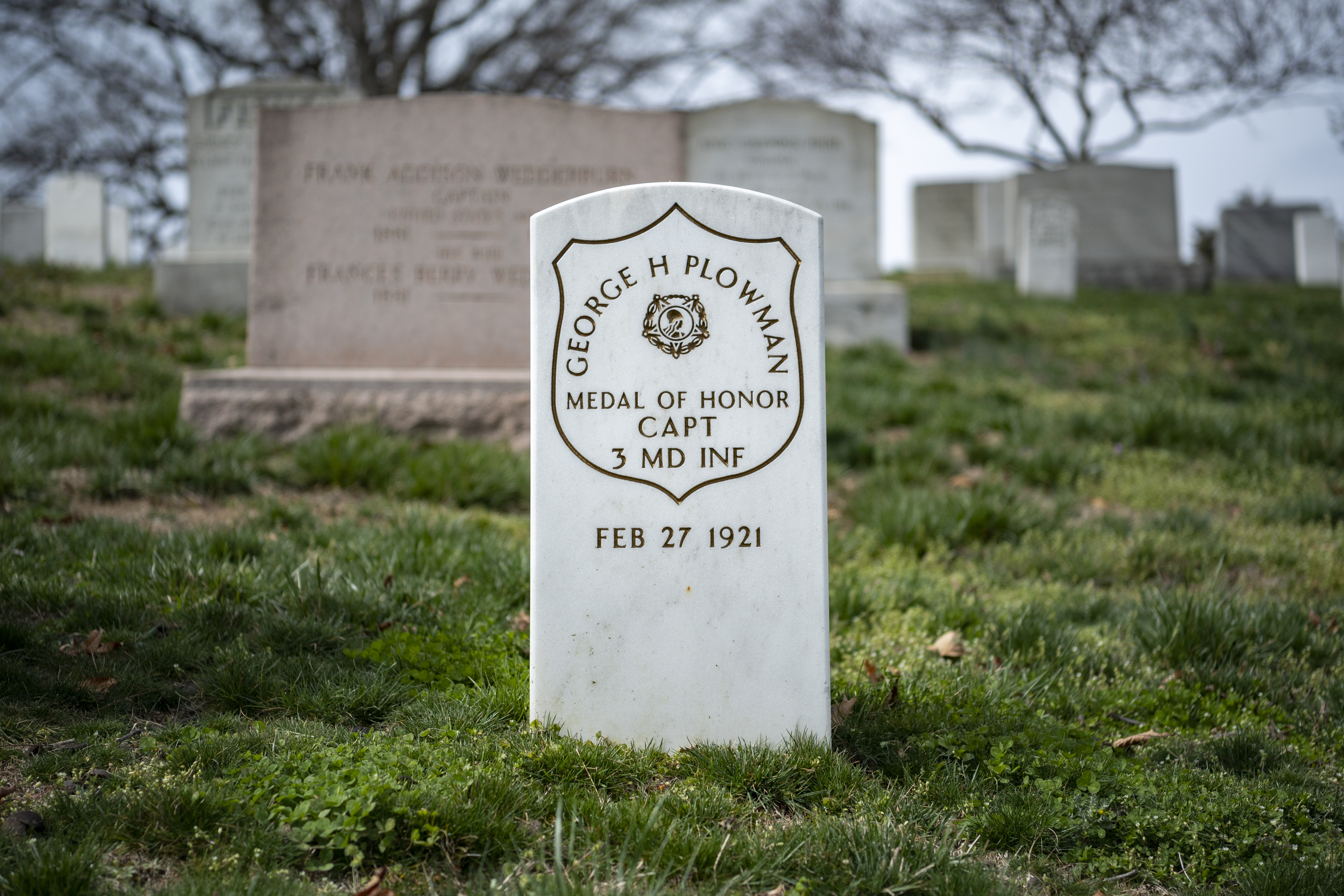
Grave at Arlington National Cemetery

Plowman was born in Oxford, England. He served in the 16th West Virginia Infantry and the 9th Maryland Infantry before joining the 3rd Maryland Volunteer Infantry in February 1864. He was commissioned as an officer the following September, and mustered out in July 1865.

== Medal of Honor citation ==
The President of the United States of America, in the name of Congress, takes pleasure in presenting the Medal of Honor to Sergeant Major George H. Plowman, United States Army, for extraordinary heroism on 17 June 1864, while serving with 3d Maryland Infantry, in action at Petersburg, Virginia. Sergeant Major Plowman recaptured the colors of the 2d Pennsylvania Provisional Artillery.

== See also ==
- List of American Civil War Medal of Honor recipients: M–P
