= Lamon's Brigade =

American Civil War brigade

Lamon's Brigade was the unofficial designation for a military brigade organized for the Federal government during the American Civil War by Ward H. Lamon, the U.S. Marshall for the District of Columbia and a friend of President Lincoln. It was begun at Williamsport, Maryland, in June 1861, and continued through the end of that year. It was originally intended to be composed of Unionist Virginians, but mostly contained men from Maryland, Pennsylvania, and Illinois.

== Initial organization ==
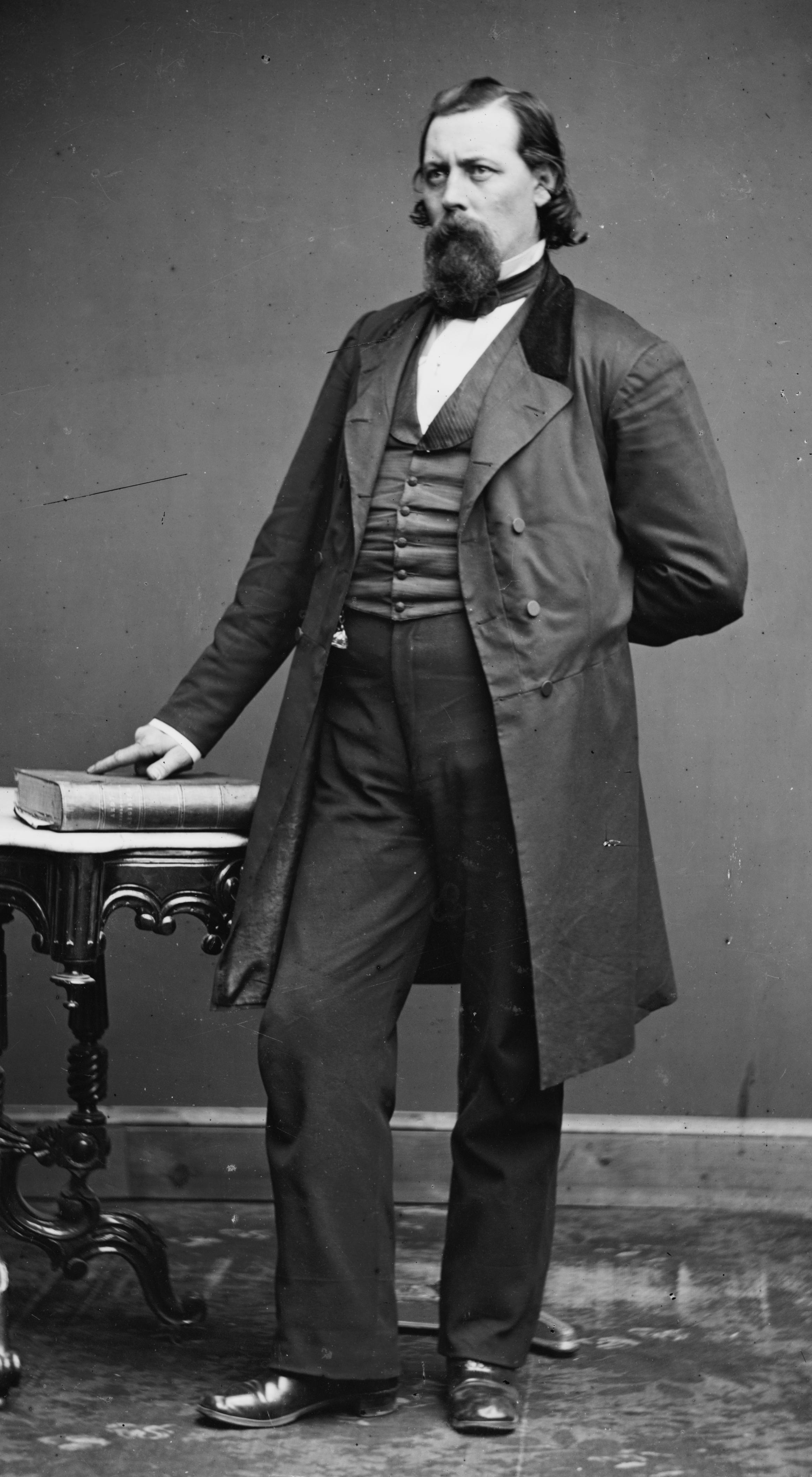

Ward Hill Lamon had been born in Frederick County, Virginia, and at the start of the war he believed that there were enough Unionist Virginians in the counties along the Maryland border that he could raise a regiment of volunteers. He wrote to Lincoln about his project on May 27, 1861, and Lincoln gave his approval. Lamon began his regiment in Williamsport, Maryland, opposite the Virginia border. While there were some refugee Virginians already in Maryland, recruitment proved difficult.

On June 12 the New York Times reported

"A proclamation is largely circulated signed by W.H. Lamon, Marshall of the District of Columbia, calling upon all loyal Virginians to rally and form regiments under the command of Phillip Pendleton. Sixty Virginians, who left the Confederate troops and came over to avoid the Virginia military requisition, have gone into camp at Williamsport, under Col. Lamon's proclamation, elected a captain, and form the nucleus of a regiment.

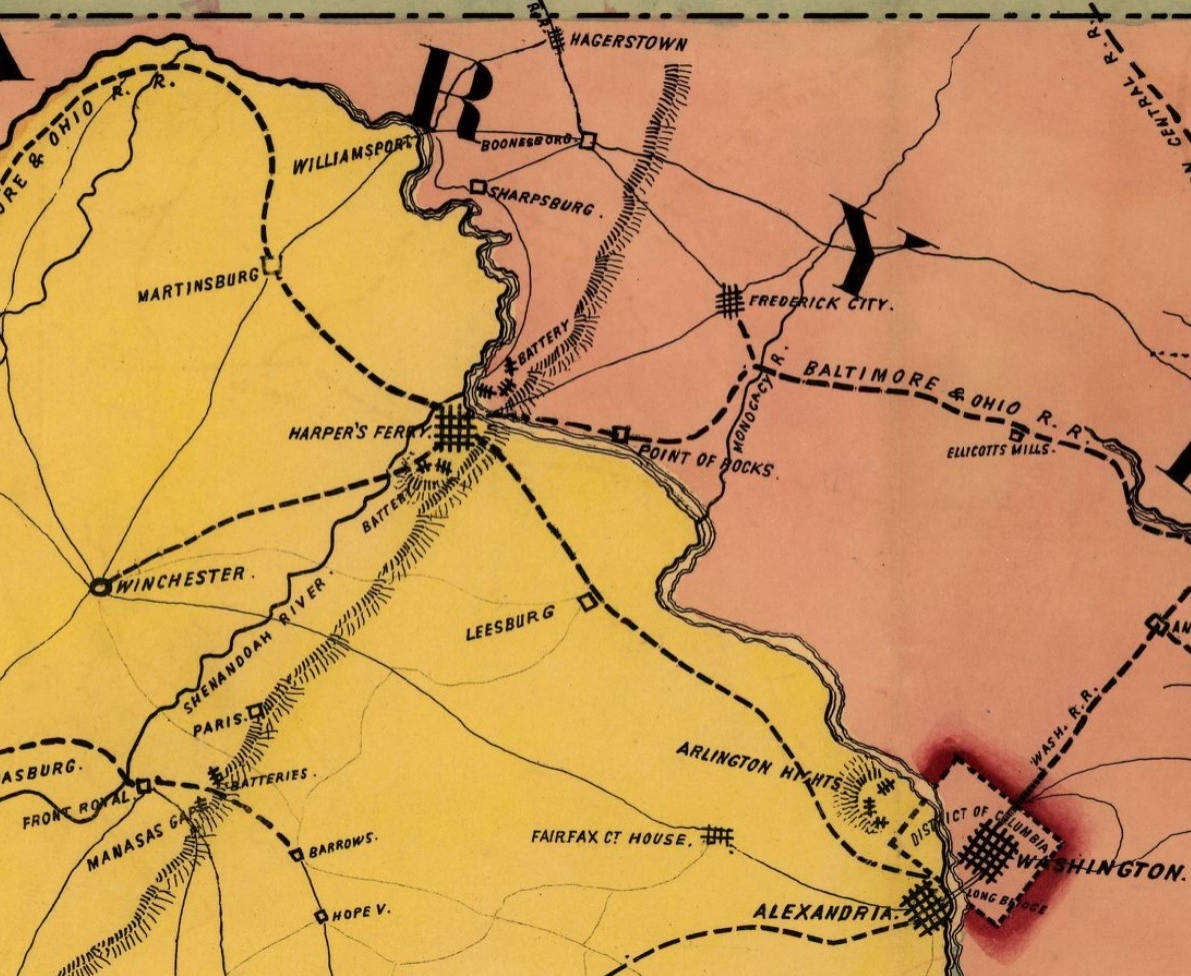
Virginia and Maryland borders along the Potomac River showing Williamsport, Md., and Martinsburg, Va.

The Baltimore Daily Exchange, an anti-administration newspaper, reported On July 22-

"The much-talked-of regiment of Col. Lamon, pretended to be recruited from the Union men of Berkeley county and the vicinity, has proved a perfect failure. He has not yet recruited one hundred men."

Berkeley County is recorded as having contributed one company to Lamon's regiment of Virginia Volunteers, Co. B. Berkeley County raised six other companies during the war, five for the Confederacy and one other for the Union.

Under the terms of military service companies of less than 85 men could not be officially mustered and equipped by the government and Lamon was faced with the prospect of equipping the men from his own funds, but a personal exception was made for him and Lincoln cautioned Lamon on June 25

"I spoke to the Secretary of War yesterday, and he consents, & so do I, that as fast as you get companies, you may procure a U.S. officer, and have them mustered in. Have this done quietly; because we can not do the labor of adopting it as a general practice."

Recruitment did not meet Lamon's expectations and he began to look further west to meet his goal to reach a brigade-size force.

== 39th Illinois, "Yates' Phalanx" ==
In September Lamon travelled west through Pennsylvania to Illinois and Missouri. In Pennsylvania he attached two independent companies of Pennsylvania artillery to his brigade, Cos. C and F. Company C, known as "Thompson's Battery", had been mostly recruited in Pittsburgh and added 23 Marylanders when they arrived at Williamsport. Company F, known as "Hampton's Battery", was recruited in Pittsburgh. The four cavalry companies attached to Lamon's Virginia regiment, which were later incorporated into the 1st Maryland Cavalry Regiment, were recruited in Pennsylvania.

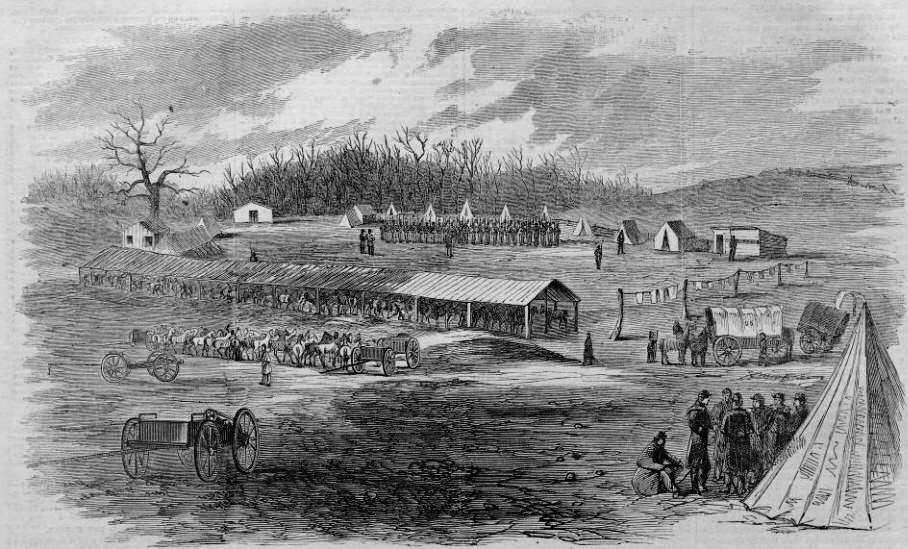
Robert H. Patterson's Cavalry, Hancock, Md., Harper's Weekly 1862. Patterson's company was organized in Pittsburgh on April 5, 1861, and attached to Lamon's brigade.

He met with the Illinois governor Richard Yates and asked to be allowed to raise recruits in Illinois for his brigade, informing the governor that he had already recruited some men in Chicago. Gov. Yates told him that he could not recruit in Illinois for regiments outside the state, but he offered to let Lamon have the 39th Illinois Infantry, nicknamed "Yates' Phalanx", since it had already been credited to the state. Lamon was reluctant, stating that he wanted to recruit them himself but he later accepted the regiment for the brigade. In the meantime Brig. Gen. Fremont had ordered the 39th to St. Louis. An exchange of letters between Gov. Yates and Fremont resulted in Fremont ordering the 39th Illinois to be sent by train from St. Louis to Williamsport, Md.

The resulting expense of transporting the regiment drew a congressional inquiry and criticism of Lamon, as the cost was estimated to be about $30,000. Lamon was further criticized for reportedly representing himself as a brigadier general and wearing the uniform as such. Gov. Yates replied to Lamon's request for his recollection of their meeting, to which Yates replied

"You did not, as I remember, claim to be a Brigadier General. I saw nothing in your conduct in the least derogatory to the high estimation, in which you were always held here as a citizen and a gentleman."

Congressional testimony of railroad employees stated that Lamon was presented to them as a brigadier general and was wearing the uniform. He was supplied with free transportation to St. Louis, where he arrived on October 25, and from there to Springfield, Il. with his own railroad car. The committee suggested that Lamon should reimburse the government for the costs of transportation, but the matter was not pursued.

== Reassignment of the brigade ==
Ward Lamon returned to his duties as U.S. Marshall for the District of Columbia in November. The units of his brigade were placed under the command of Col. S.H. Leonard, whose brigade came to include the 39th Illinois, 13th Massachusetts, 12th Indiana and..."a section of artillery with ten Parrott guns; three companies of cavalry; and six companies of the 1st Virginia volunteers, originally attempted to be recruited for Lamon. In all there are 3,524 men in the command..." Lamon wanted his brigade to remain intact, but on January 15, 1862, the U.S. Adjutant General advised the governor of Maryland that Lamon's companies needed to be consolidated with the incomplete Maryland regiments. The artillery companies recruited in Pennsylvania were eventually reassigned to Pennsylvania after spending some months as part of the 1st Maryland Brigade. The four cavalry companies of the 1st Virginia Volunteers were organized within the 1st Maryland Cavalry, the four infantry companies were organized within the 3rd Maryland Infantry. There is no further record of any Virginia companies organized for Lamon's brigade. The 39th Illinois, 13th Indiana and 13th Massachusetts Infantry regiments were assigned to guard the railroad lines and points along the upper Potomac as part of Gen. Nathaniel P. Banks' Division of the Army of the Potomac.
