= Priscilla Strode Turner House =

Historic house in West Virginia, United States

- U.S. National Register of Historic Places
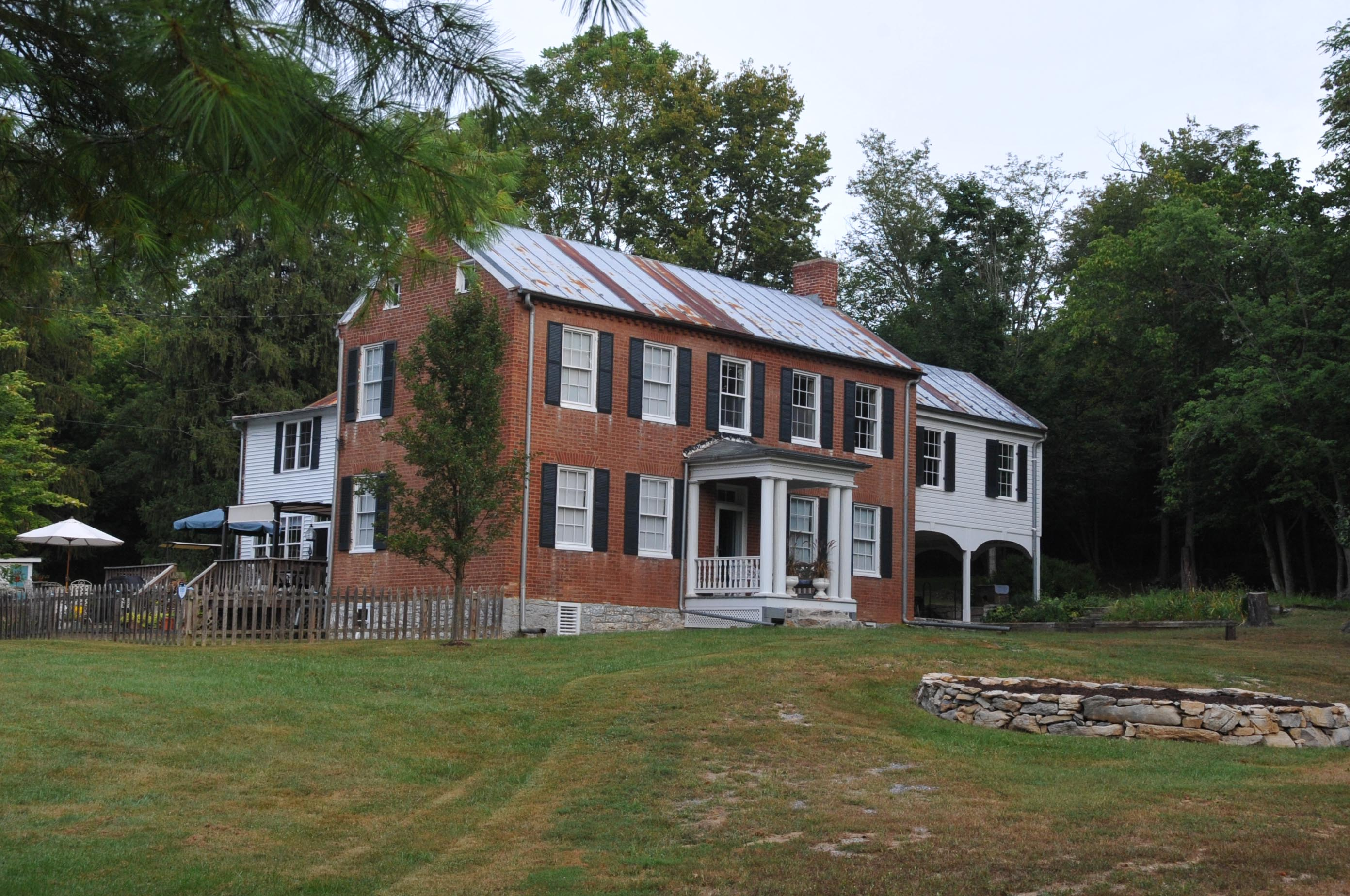

- Location within West Virginia Location within the United States
- Location: 347 Carlyle Rd., Beddington, West Virginia
- Coordinates: 39°31′21″N 77°52′55″W
- Area: 7 acres (2.8 ha)
- Built: 1850
- Architectural style: Greek Revival
- NRHP reference No.: 02001527
- Added to NRHP: December 12, 2002

Priscilla Strode Turner House is a historic home located at Beddington, Berkeley County, West Virginia. It was built about 1850 and is a two-story, five-bay, brick dwelling in the Greek Revival style. It has an L-shaped plan and is topped by a gable roof. Also on the property is a stone spring house, also dated to about 1850. Angeline Turner, a daughter of Ehud and Priscilla Strode Turner, married Lincoln associate Ward Hill Lamon (1828 - 1893) in 1850.

It was listed on the National Register of Historic Places in 2002.
