= USS Myles C. Fox (DD-829) =

Gearing-class destroyer

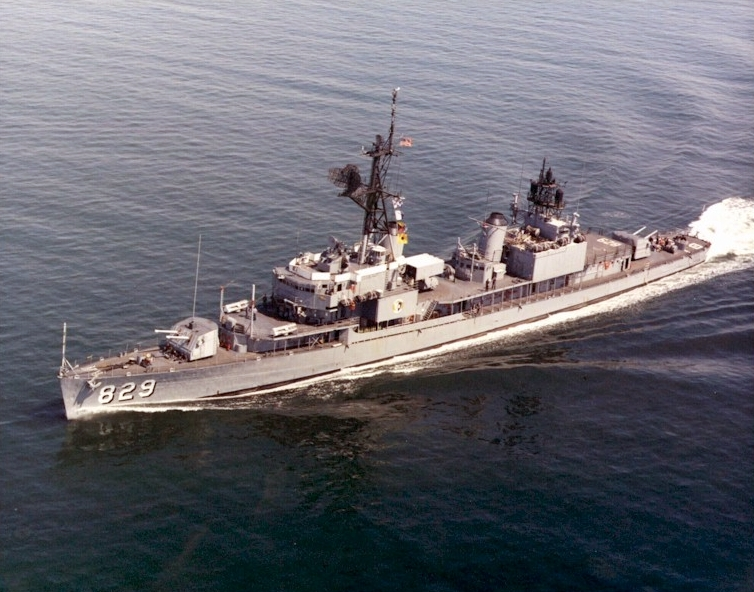
- USS Myles C. Fox (DD-829) underway in early 1970s

History

United States
- Name: USS Myles C. Fox (DD-829)
- Namesake: Myles C. Fox
- Builder: Bath Iron Works, Bath, Maine
- Laid down: 14 August 1944
- Launched: 13 January 1945
- Commissioned: 20 March 1945
- Reclassified: DDR-829, 18 March 1949
- Identification: Callsign: NAZI; Hull number: DD-829
- Reclassified: DD-829, 1 April 1964
- Decommissioned: 1 October 1979
- Stricken: 1 October 1979
- Fate: Transferred to Greece for spare parts, 2 August 1980

General characteristics
- Class & type: Gearing-class destroyer
- Displacement: 2,425 long tons (2,464 t)
- Length: 390 ft 6 in (119.02 m)
- Beam: 41 ft 1 in (12.52 m)
- Draft: 18 ft 6 in (5.64 m)
- Propulsion: 4 Babcock & Wilcox 615 psi (4.24 MPa) 850 °F (450 °C) superheated express type boilers supplying two sets of high pressure, low pressure and cruising turbines generating a total of 60,000 shp (45 MW) to two shafts each with a 12.5 foot (3.8 m) four-bladed propeller. Shaft rpm: 350, speed at standard displacement: 34.5 knots (64 km/h)
- Speed: 36 knots (67 km/h; 41 mph)
- Complement: 367
- Armament: 6 × 5"/38 caliber guns; 12 × 40 mm AA guns; 8 × 20 mm AA guns; 5 × 21 inch (533 mm) torpedo tubes; 2 × depth charge racks

USS Myles C. Fox (DD/DDR-829) was a Gearing-class destroyer in the United States Navy during World War II and the years following. She was named for Myles C. Fox, a USMC lieutenant who was posthumously awarded the Navy Cross for actions during World War II.

== Namesake ==
Myles Crosby Fox was born on 13 October 1918 in New York, New York. He graduated from Williams College in 1939.

Fox enlisted in the United States Marine Corps Reserve on 4 May 1939. He was commissioned as a second lieutenant on 29 November 1940 and promoted to first lieutenant on 11 April 1942. In the initial assault of the Guadalcanal campaign, Fox was with the 1st Marine Raider Battalion during the seizure of Tulagi on the night of 7 August 1942. He ignored mortal wounds to deploy his men to fill a gap in the American lines, thus repulsing a Japanese attack with heavy losses. Fox was posthumously awarded the Navy Cross. The destroyer escort USS Myles C. Fox was named for him, but its construction was cancelled in 1944.

== Service history ==
Myles C. Fox was laid down by the Bath Iron Works Corporation, Bath, Maine on 14 August 1944, launched on 13 January 1945; sponsored by Mrs. James C. Fox, mother of Lieutenant Fox; and commissioned at Boston on 20 March 1945.

=== 1945–1949 ===
After Caribbean shakedown and training off New Jersey, Myles C. Fox sailed on 5 July 1945 for the Panama Canal, San Diego, and Hawaii, arriving Pearl Harbor on the 28th. She departed Pearl Harbor on 10 August to Marshall, Operation Downfall, Olympic (plate #117 staging of forces) receiving word en route of cessation of hostilities. After calling at Eniwetok, she continued to Japan, anchoring in Tokyo Bay on 9 September to begin duty screening carriers providing air cover for the occupation landings on Japan.

The destroyer served in the occupation until sailing for Saipan on 8 January 1946. On 25 March, she headed from the Marianas for San Diego with veterans aboard for transportation home. Arriving 11 April, she operated along the west coast until 6 January 1947, when she sailed for the Far East, arriving Yokosuka on the 25th. In ensuing months she called at principal ports of Japan with missions to Korea, China, Okinawa, and Hong Kong.

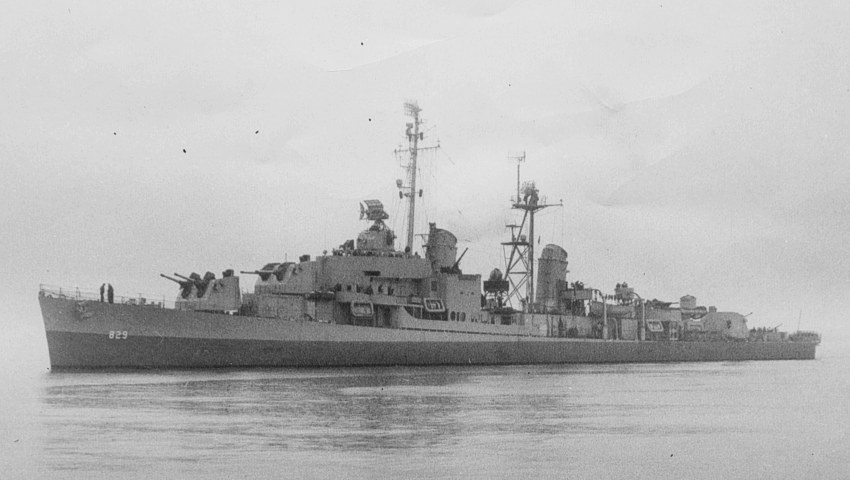
USS Myles C. Fox (DD-829) in 1945.

On 19 July Myles C. Fox and Hawkins (DD-873) with British escort ship HMS Hart (U58) saved the crew and passengers of SS Hong Kheng after the passenger ship had run aground on Chilang Point some 8 miles north of Hong Kong. Six motorboats, two from each warship, and two skiffs from Hong Kong, made 76 trips to rescue some 1,800 survivors.

Myles C. Fox departed Yokosuka on 23 September and reached San Diego on 8 October. After west coast operations and overhaul, she made another Far Eastern cruise, 2 October – 23 December 1948, operating principally in the ocean approaches to Tsingtao, China, with fast carrier forces. She then operated out of San Diego until sailing on 2 May 1949 for a new home port, Newport, Rhode Island. She had been redesignated a radar picket destroyer (DDR-829) on 18 March 1949.

=== 1950–1959 ===
Following arrival Newport on 23 May 1949, the ship served in the North Atlantic for a year before getting underway from Norfolk on 3 May 1950 for the Mediterranean. Her 6th Fleet operations included simulated attack problems with submarines and other fleet readiness exercises. She visited ports of France, Italy, Turkey, Trieste, Greece, and Spain, cleared Gibraltar on 1 October, and returned to Newport on the 10th.

Repairs in New York Naval Shipyard, convoy exercises to Bermuda, and tactics in the Virginia Cape area kept her busy until 20 March 1951 when she put to sea with a carrier striking force that reached Gibraltar on 6 April. She returned from this Mediterranean cruise to Newport on 4 October.

After working on the east coast for almost a year, she stood out from Newport on 26 August 1952 with a fast carrier striking force built around Midway (CVB-41) and Franklin D. Roosevelt (CVB-42). This cruise took her to Greenock, Scotland, and thence into the Norwegian Sea as a unit of the NATO force. She visited ports of the British Isles before proceeding by way of Lisbon to the Mediterranean for another tour with the powerful 6th Fleet, returning Newport on 4 February 1953.

On 8 June 1953 Myles C. Fox left Norfolk on a midshipman cruise that included good will calls at Rio de Janeiro and Cartagena, Colombia. She debarked the midshipmen at the Naval Academy on 5 August and returned to Newport. For the next two years she operated on the east coast and in the Caribbean. She departed Newport on 2 May 1955 for the Mediterranean. After three months with the 6th Fleet, she returned to Newport on 25 August.

=== 1960–1969 ===
During the ensuing years, Myles C. Fox continued this pattern of service, alternating operations on the east coast and in the Caribbean with 6th Fleet deployments. In 1961 she won the Battle Efficiency "E", and in 1964 her home port was changed to Boston. That year the ship underwent FRAM I overhaul and modernization, and she was redesignated DD-829 on 1 April.

Following her FRAM I overhaul, on 1 July 1965, Fox experienced a catastrophic fire in Radio Central. After repairs at the Boston Naval Shipyard, in June 1965 the Fox was dispatched to help support U.S. efforts to oppose a Cuban led insurgency in the Dominican Republic. The Armed Forces Expeditionary Medal was authorized as recognition for this Cold War campaign. On 9 August 1965, Fox deployed to the Mediterranean Sea for operations with the Sixth Fleet

On 6 March 1966, Fox was assigned to the Gemini 8 recovery team and stationed in the eastern Atlantic. While off the coast of Africa, she sped to the aid of Swedish freighter M/V Palma which was on fire. For three days firefighting teams battled the blaze before Caloosahatchee (AO-98) and Charles P. Cecil (DD-835) arrived to lend a hand. The combined efforts of these U.S. Navy ships finally extinguished the flames, and Palma resumed steaming under her own power.

After DASH qualifications off the Virginia Capes, the destroyer operated along the east coast until getting underway for the Far East on 4 October. Steaming via the Panama Canal, Hawaii, Japan, and the Philippines, the destroyer arrived off the coast of North Vietnam on 7 January 1967. While in the war zone Myles C. Fox delivered numerous fire support missions against enemy ground forces and installations. Her guns also damaged three enemy junks and two sampans. She headed home on the second half of a round-the-world cruise 20 February and arrived Newport from Suez and Gibraltar 25 April.

Myles C. Fox operated on the east coast and in the Caribbean during most of 1967. She entered Boston Naval Shipyard on 26 September for overhaul through 1 January 1968.

=== 1969–1979 ===
The ship entered the Boston Naval Shipyard for a regular overhaul on 26 Dec 1967 where the DASH capability was removed. Upon completion of overhaul in Jan 1968, the ship proceeded to Guantanamo Bay, Cuba for refresher training. Upon completion she deployed to the Mediterranean and returned to the US in October 1968. In January 1969 the ship participated in the Apollo 11 program by taking the astronaut quarantine trailer on sea trials from Norfolk, Virginia. The trailer was used by the astronauts in July 1969 when they returned from the Moon. In March she deployed to the Indian Ocean visiting ports in Africa, Madagascar, India, Pakistan, Iran, etc., returning in Sept 1969.

The ship returned to Cuba in the spring of 1970. She completed training in June and after return to Newport she departed for participation in UNITAS XI in South American waters. For the next 5.5 months extensive training was conducted with South American navies of Venezuela, Brazil, Argentina, Uruguay, Peru, and Columbia. The operation was capped by a return passage through the Panama canal. The ship returned to Newport on Dec 1970. On 12 March 1971 the Myles C. Fox entered the Boston Naval Shipyard for her regular overhaul period. After overhaul completion the ship departed for Guantanamo Bay, Cuba for refresher training. After completion and return to Newport the ship departed for the Middle East on 7 Jan 1972 where she operated for 4 months. On 2 May 1972 the ship arrived off the coast of Viet Nam and for the next 2 months provided naval gunfire support in the south and spearheaded surface strikes into North Vietnamese waters. On 10 Aug the ship was awarded its second Battle Efficiency "E" and on 14 Aug returned to Newport.

In June 1973 the ship completed a fuel oil conversion to navy distillate and in July was transferred to the Naval Reserve Force(NRF), changing homeport to Brooklyn, NY. During the period 1973–1979 the mission of the Fox was that of training the Naval Reserve component of the Navy. In Feb 1978 the ship departed Brooklyn for selected refresher training in Cuba. Upon completion in March she returned to Brooklyn and during that time was assigned numerous duties with elements of the second fleet.

Myles C. Fox was decommissioned on 1 October 1979 after serving 34 1/2 years. She was sold to Greece in 1980 and cannibalized for spare parts; the ship was scrapped in 2003.
