= USS Myles C. Fox (DE-546) =

Unfinished US Navy destroyer escort

History

United States
- Name: USS Myles C. Fox
- Namesake: First Lieutenant Myles C. Fox (1918-1942), a U.S. Marine Corps officer and Navy Cross recipient
- Builder: Boston Navy Yard, Boston, Massachusetts (proposed)
- Laid down: date unknown
- Launched: Never
- Commissioned: Never
- Fate: Construction contract cancelled 10 June 1944

General characteristics
- Class & type: John C. Butler-class destroyer escort
- Displacement: 1,350 tons
- Length: 306 ft (93 m)
- Beam: 36 ft 8 in (11 m)
- Draft: 9 ft 5 in (3 m)
- Propulsion: 2 boilers, 2 geared turbine engines, 12,000 shp; 2 propellers
- Speed: 24 knots (44 km/h)
- Range: 6,000 nmi. (12,000 km) @ 12 kt
- Complement: 14 officers, 201 enlisted
- Armament: 2 × single 5 in (127 mm) guns; 2 × twin 40 mm (1.6 in) AA guns; 10 × single 20 mm (0.79 in) AA guns; 1 × triple 21 in (533 mm) torpedo tubes; 8 × depth charge throwers; 1 × Hedgehog ASW mortar; 2 × depth charge racks

USS Myles C. Fox (DE-546) was a proposed World War II United States Navy John C. Butler-class destroyer escort that was never completed.

Myles C. Fox was to have been built at the Boston Navy Yard in Boston, Massachusetts. However, her construction was cancelled on 10 June 1944.

The name Myles C. Fox was reassigned to the destroyer USS Myles C. Fox (DD-829).
