= USS Fox (CG-33) =

Cruiser of the United States

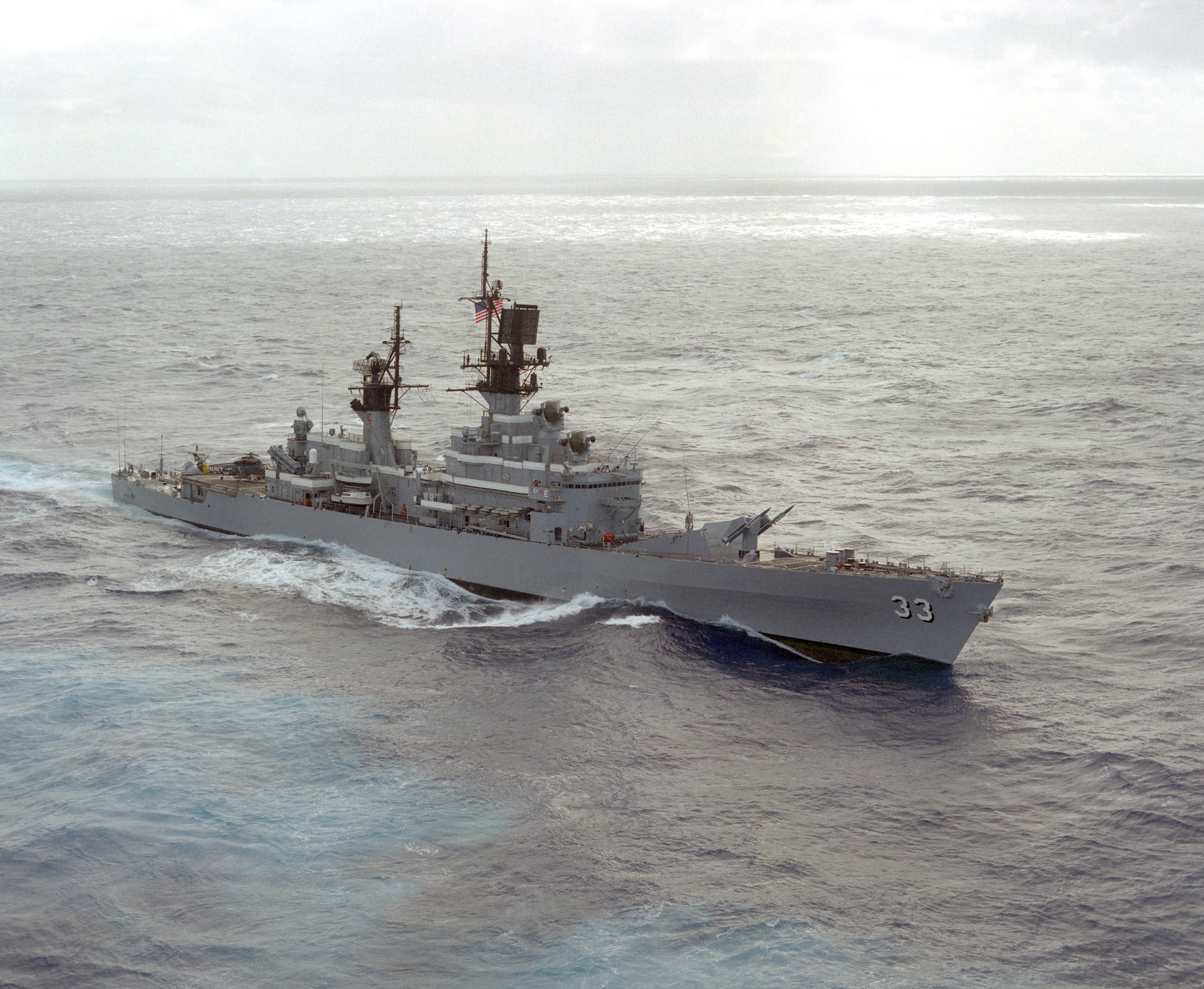
- USS Fox (CG-33) on 16 December 1988

History

United States
- Name: USS Fox
- Namesake: Gustavus Fox
- Ordered: 16 January 1962
- Builder: Todd Shipyards, Los Angeles Division, San Pedro, California
- Laid down: 15 January 1963
- Launched: 21 November 1964
- Acquired: 20 May 1966
- Commissioned: 8 May 1966
- Decommissioned: 15 April 1994
- Reclassified: CG-33 on 30 June 1975
- Stricken: 15 April 1994
- Home port: NS San Diego (former)
- Motto: "Faire Sans Dire"
- Fate: Sold for scrap to International Shipbreaking LTD, Brownsville, TX. Scrapping completed 28 October 2007.
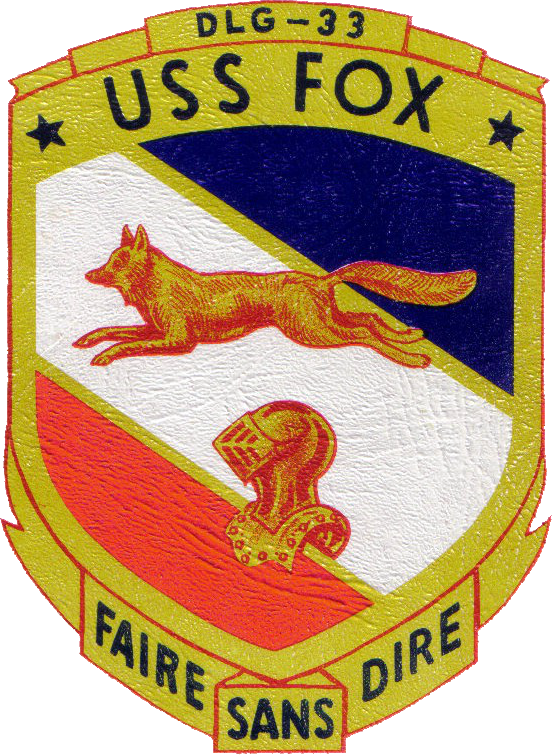
- Badge

General characteristics
- Class & type: Belknap-class cruiser
- Displacement: 7,930 tons
- Length: 547 ft (167 m)
- Beam: 55 ft (17 m)
- Draft: 28 ft 10 in (8.79 m)
- Speed: 30 knots (35 mph; 56 km/h)
- Complement: 418 officers and men
- Sensors & processing systems: AN/SPS-48E air-search radar; AN/SPS-49(V)5 air-search radar; AN/SPG-55B fire-control radar; AN/SPG-53F gun fire-control radar; AN/SQS-26 sonar
- Electronic warfare & decoys: AN/SLQ-32
- Armament: 1 × 1 Mark 42 5-inch / 54-caliber gun; 2 × 2 3 in (76 mm)/50-caliber guns (removed later in the ships life and replaced by harpoon and phalanx); 1 × 2 mk 10 mod 7 Terrier / SM-2ER missile launcher; 2 x 3 12.75-inch (324 mm) torpedo tubes; 2 x 4 Harpoon missile launchers; 2 x 6 Phalanx CIWS
- Aircraft carried: 1 sh-2 seasprite asw helicopter
- Aviation facilities: helipad and hangar

USS Fox (DLG-33/CG-33) was a Belknap class cruiser of the United States Navy, named after Gustavus V. Fox, President Abraham Lincoln's Assistant Secretary of the Navy. The keel for DLG-33 was authenticated and laid in ceremonies at Todd Shipyards, Los Angeles Division, San Pedro, California on 15 January 1963.

== History ==
Rear Admiral Frank Virden, then Commander Cruiser-Destroyer Force, US Pacific Fleet, presided over the ceremonies for the unnamed ship. Christening and launching ceremonies were performed on 21 November 1964. Fox entered naval service as a guided missile frigate (DLG) on 28 May 1966 when commissioned at Long Beach Naval Shipyard.

Fox subsequently transited to her homeport of San Diego on 6 October 1966 and become the first ship in the Pacific Fleet capable of launching both anti-submarine rockets (ASROC) and surface-to-air guided missiles from the same launching system.

USS Fox, as DLG-33, wasted no time distinguishing herself. Participating in support of the large scale troop build up in Vietnam, and consequent increase in aircraft operations, her technology at the time was formidable. Her actions not only included support to the Vietnam War shore operations in the Western Pacific but she did so at her primary duty station off the coast of North Vietnam as the northern search and rescue ship controlling aircraft carrier-launched combat aircraft at PIRAZ. On a normal day, Fox monitored the activity of 200 Navy and Air Force missions. In particular, on 23 October 1967, a Fox air controller directed two F-4 fighters from the carrier USS Constellation to intercept the subsequent kill of a North Vietnamese MIG-21 aircraft over Hanoi. It was the first time during the Vietnam War a shipboard controller had directed an intercept which resulted in a shoot-down of enemy aircraft. For such gallantry, Fox was awarded the Meritorious Unit Commendation graciously accepted by her then CO: Captain R.O. Whelander.

On 11 January 1972, Fox fired two RIM-2 Terrier missiles at a North Vietnamese MiG-21 operating near Vinh, however neither missile hit the target. In 1972, Fox was the at-sea platform in support of Chief of Naval Operations Project DV-98 LAMPS. Fox earned the award of an Operations Department Efficiency GOLD "E" for five straight years of operational readiness.

Fox was originally classified as a guided missile frigate along with her sister ships. They were funded by Congress during FY61 and FY62 as Belknap-class combatants at a time when "cruiser" nomenclature was forbidden. Designed as a "single-ended" guided missile platform built to screen aircraft carriers and provide combat air support.

On 30 June 1975, Fox was reclassified as a guided missile cruisers (CG). Original armament included anti-submarine (ASROC) and anti-air (Terrier) guided missiles. Such systems could automatically locate, track and engage the enemy at extremely long ranges. In addition to a 5-inch / 54 caliber gun and two MK32 torpedo launchers; AN/SQS-26 sonar; AN/SPS-48 three-dimensional radar; AN/SPS-40 two-dimensional radar; NTDS (later CDS) computer processing and dissemination of tactical information data systems, other equipment was added including quad-canister Harpoon surface to surface missile launchers and Vulcan Phalanx Close in Weapons System. During her final shipyard overhaul in 1989, Fox received the New Threat Upgrade (NTU) combat system which significantly enhanced her warfighting potential.

Fox's first visit to the Red Sea was in March 1976. Her first deployment to the Persian Gulf took place in November 1980. The Iran-Iraq conflicts of the 1980s made it necessary for Fox to escort U.S. flagged oil tankers through such areas as the Strait of Hormuz of the Arabian Sea. Her deployment during 1987 included this mission which earned Fox her second Meritorious Unit Commendation.

Between 1966 and 1993, Fox had made 15 deployments to areas of conflict. Additional awards for service and valor include three Battle "E" Ribbons, two Navy Expeditionary Medals for services in the Indian Ocean/Persian Gulf, two National Defense Service Medals, the Vietnam Service Medal (with two bronze stars), the Southwest Asia Service Medal (with bronze star), Sea Service Deployment Ribbons and the Republic of Vietnam Campaign Medal.

Fox concluded her last overseas cruise near the end of 1993 and immediately began inactivation preparations. Decommissioned in mid-April 1994 and was laid up at Inactive Ship Facility, Suisun Bay, California. She was sold for scrapping in 2006 to International Shipbreaking, Limited, Brownsville, Texas.
