= USS Fox (DD-234) =

Clemson-class destroyer

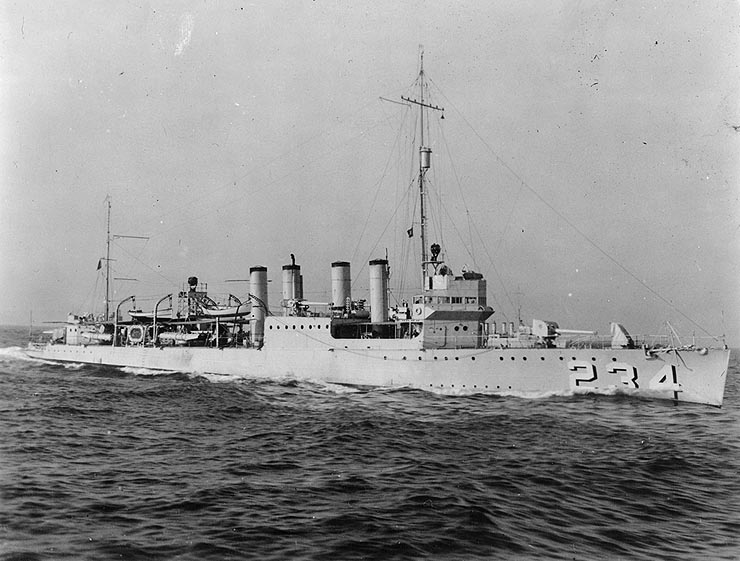
- USS Fox (DD-234)

History

United States
- Namesake: Gustavus Vasa Fox
- Builder: New York Shipbuilding
- Laid down: 25 June 1918
- Launched: 12 June 1919
- Commissioned: 17 May 1920
- Decommissioned: 2 February 1931
- Recommissioned: 1 April 1932
- Decommissioned: 16 September 1938
- Recommissioned: 25 September 1939
- Reclassified: Miscellaneous auxiliary, AG-85, 1 October 1944
- Decommissioned: 29 November 1945
- Stricken: 19 December 1945
- Fate: Sold for scrapping 12 November 1946

General characteristics
- Class & type: Clemson-class destroyer
- Displacement: 1,190 tons
- Length: 314 feet 4 inches (95.81 m)
- Beam: 31 feet (9.4 m)
- Draft: 9 feet 4 inches (2.84 m)
- Propulsion: 26,500 shp (20 MW); geared turbines, 2 screws
- Speed: 34 knots (63 km/h)
- Range: 4,900 nautical miles (9,100 km); @ 15 kt
- Complement: 130 officers and enlisted
- Armament: 4 x 5" 5 in (130 mm), 1 x 3 in (76 mm), 12 x 21 inch (533 mm) tt.

USS Fox (DD-234/AG-85) was a Clemson-class destroyer in the United States Navy during World War II. She was the fourth ship named for Gustavus Vasa Fox, Assistant Secretary of the Navy during the Civil War.

== Construction and commissioning ==
Fox was launched 12 June 1919 by the New York Shipbuilding Company; sponsored by Miss Virginia Blair, the grandniece of Gustavus V. Fox; and commissioned 17 May 1920.

== Service history ==
The ship was assigned to foreign service and, after fitting out, departed Philadelphia 20 August 1920 for Newport, Rhode Island, where she took on torpedoes and fuel, and on the 28th got underway for the Mediterranean area. She arrived at Constantinople, Turkey, 21 September reporting for duty with U.S. Naval Detachment Operating in Turkish waters. Fox cruised in the eastern Mediterranean and Black Sea until July 1922, visiting various ports of Turkey, Greece, Palestine, Syria, Asia Minor, Romania, Russia and Egypt. At a time of disturbed conditions throughout the Near East and southern Russia she rendered aid to American commercial men, relief and Red Cross workers, and Food Administration officials; transported mail, dispatches, and passengers; served as station ship at various ports; and assisted in the evacuation of refugees from Crimea.

Departing Constantinople for the United States on 8 July 1922, Fox arrived at Philadelphia on the 27th. After undergoing overhaul and engaging in exercises, the ship arrived at Norfolk, Virginia 28 September and was again fitted for duty in the Near East. She departed Norfolk 2 October 1922 and arrived at Constantinople on the 22nd. Here she engaged in communication and intelligence duty with the U.S. Naval Detachment in Turkish waters until 18 July 1923, when she sailed for the United States via Naples and Gibraltar, arriving New York 11 August.

During September and October 1923, Fox attached to the Scouting Fleet, engaged in fleet maneuvers in the Newport area. In November the ship was assigned to the 3d Naval District and throughout the following 7 years was utilized in training Naval Reservists. She arrived at Philadelphia on 24 October 1930, and was placed out of commission at the Philadelphia Navy Yard 2 February 1931.

Fox was placed in commission in rotating reserve at Philadelphia on 1 April 1932. On 18 June she was placed in full commission and assigned to Destroyer Division 1, Squadron 1, Scouting Force. Departing Philadelphia 29 June, Fox proceeded to Hampton Roads and on 2 July was underway with Division 1 for the West Coast of the United States, via the Panama Canal, arriving San Diego, California on the 22d. From 1932 to 1938 Fox operated almost continuously in the Pacific with destroyer squadrons of the Scouting Force and Battle Fleet, engaging in fleet tactical and strategical exercises along the coast and cruising to the Canal Zone or Hawaiian area to participate in fleet maneuvers ("problems"). During this period she made two cruises to the Atlantic and Caribbean area; one from April to October 1934, and the other from April to October 1936. On 14 May 1938, Fox departed San Diego for the United States East Coast for decommissioning. She arrived at the Philadelphia Navy Yard on 2 June and was placed out of commission 16 September 1938.

=== World War II ===
Recommissioned 25 September 1939, Fox was assigned to the Atlantic Squadron and from 25 October performed escort and patrol duty along the Atlantic coast and in the Caribbean area until August 1940. Arriving Balboa, Canal Zone, 25 August she performed inshore patrol duty from this port until sailing for San Francisco, California, 25 October. Fox patrolled with the Local Defense Forces, 12th Naval District until departure 2 January 1941 for Seattle, Washington. She patrolled off the coast of Washington and Oregon with Local Defense Forces, 13th Naval District, until December 1941, except while under overhaul from March to June, and while assigned to temporary duty in the 12th Naval District from 20 August to 9 October.

On 12 December 1941, Fox departed Bremerton, Washington, en route to Alaska as escort of Southerland. She arrived at Dutch Harbor on 18 December, and proceeded as escort for merchant ships to Sitka, Kodiak, and Dutch Harbor, returning to Seattle on 12 February 1942. Following repairs at the Puget Sound Navy Yard, she performed screening duties out of Seattle, acted as ready duty ship at Port Angeles (14–18 March), and made three escort voyages to San Pedro until 10 May 1942.

From 21 May 1942 to 20 May 1943, Fox sailed as escort with 12 merchant ship convoys bound for various ports of Alaska, and was modernized at Seattle (3 July – 8 September). On her fourth cruise of this duty, she departed Seattle 22 September 1942 for Dutch Harbor and after screening a transport to Chernofski Bay, departed Dutch Harbor 28 October to escort a convoy of four Soviet submarines to San Francisco.

On 25 May 1943, Fox departed Seattle for extended duty as patrol and escort vessel among the ports of Alaska, operating under orders of Commander, Northwest Sea Frontier until 25 March 1944. In addition to conducting scheduled exercises and operations off the coast, she made numerous trips to Alaskan waters, transporting men of the Navy, Marine Corps, and Coast Guard between Seattle and bases at Kodiak and Adak.

On 15 April, the ship departed Seattle for San Diego, where she joined Western Sea Frontier Forces, Southern California Sector. She operated in the San Diego area until September, conducting antisubmarine exercises, training men from the sound school, transporting passengers, performing escort duty, and cruising for the purpose of making moving pictures.

Fox departed San Diego 22 September 1944, and arrived at the Puget Sound Navy Yard for conversion to a miscellaneous auxiliary on 26 September. She was re-classified AG-85 on 1 October. On 4 November, the ship proceeded to Seattle and, after engaging in scheduled exercises, on the 8th got underway for San Francisco. She arrived at Naval Air Station Alameda on the 11th, and reported for duty to Commander Fleet Air. From November through September 1945, Fox was based on Alameda, engaging in plane exercises and serving as target vessel in aerial torpedo exercises in the Monterey area. She departed San Francisco Bay on 18 October 1945 for the U.S. East Coast, arriving Norfolk, Virginia, on 7 November. Fox was decommissioned 29 November 1945 at the Norfolk Navy Yard, Portsmouth, Virginia. She was sold for scrapping 12 November 1946.
