= USS Davis (TB-12) =

Torpedo boat of the United States Navy

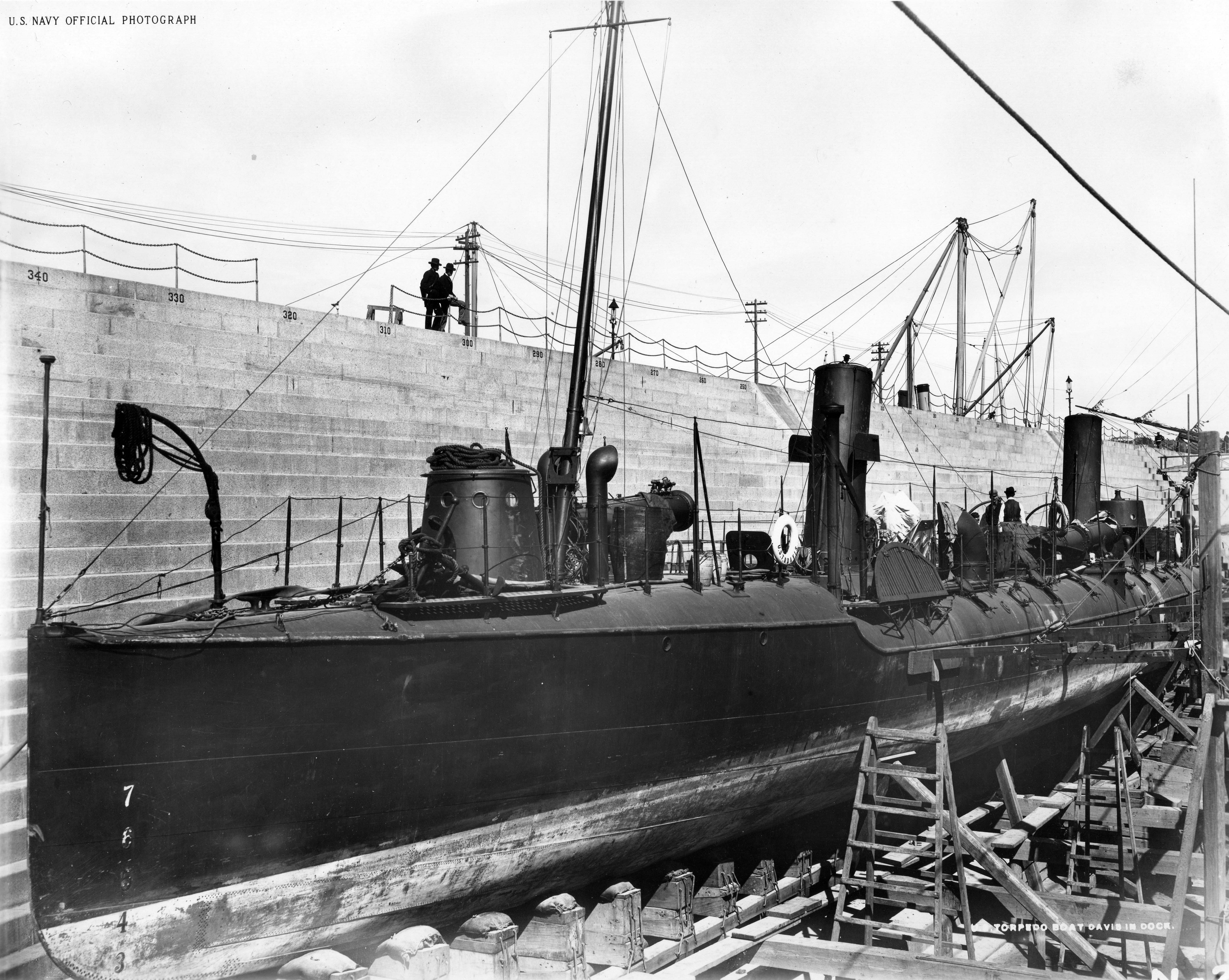
- USS Davis (TB-12) in Mare Island's Drydock #1 in April 1905.

History

United States
- Name: Davis
- Namesake: Rear Admiral Charles Henry Davis
- Ordered: 10 June 1896 (authorised)
- Builder: Wolff & Zwicker, Portland, OR
- Laid down: 2 March 1897
- Launched: 4 June 1898
- Sponsored by: Miss H. Wolff
- Commissioned: 10 May 1899
- Decommissioned: 28 March 1913
- Identification: TB-12
- Fate: Sold, 21 April 1920

General characteristics
- Class & type: Davis-class torpedo boat
- Displacement: 154 long tons (156 t)
- Length: 148 ft (45.1 m)
- Beam: 15 ft 4 in (4.7 m)
- Draft: 5 ft 10 in (1.8 m) (mean)
- Installed power: 2 × Thornycroft boilers; 1,750 ihp (1,300 kW)
- Propulsion: Vertical triple expansion engines; 2 × screw propellers
- Speed: 23 knots (43 km/h; 26 mph); 23.41 kn (26.94 mph; 43.36 km/h) (Speed on Trial)
- Complement: 24 officers and enlisted
- Armament: 3 × 1-pounder (37 mm (1.46 in)) guns; 3 × 18 in (450 mm) torpedo tubes (3x1)

USS Davis (Torpedo Boat No. 12/TB-12) was launched 4 June 1898 by Wolff and Zwicker, Portland, Oregon; sponsored by Miss H. Wolff; and commissioned 10 May 1899, Lieutenant Commander R. F. Nicholson in command.

After trials Davis was placed out of commission 5 June 1899 and laid up at Mare Island Navy Yard in reserve. She was recommissioned 23 March 1908 and assigned to Pacific Torpedo Fleet. She participated in the review for the Secretary of the Navy 8 May 1908, then cruised along the west coast as far north as the Columbia River and south as far as Magdalena Bay, Mexico, until placed in reserve at Mare Island 28 October 1909.

Davis was recommissioned 1 November 1910 for service in the San Diego area until 10 May 1911 when she again went into reserve at Mare Island. In May 1912 she was towed to Puget Sound for assignment to the Pacific Reserve Fleet. She was decommissioned there 28 March 1913 and sold for scrap 21 April 1920.
