= Gina Haspel =

American intelligence officer (born 1956)

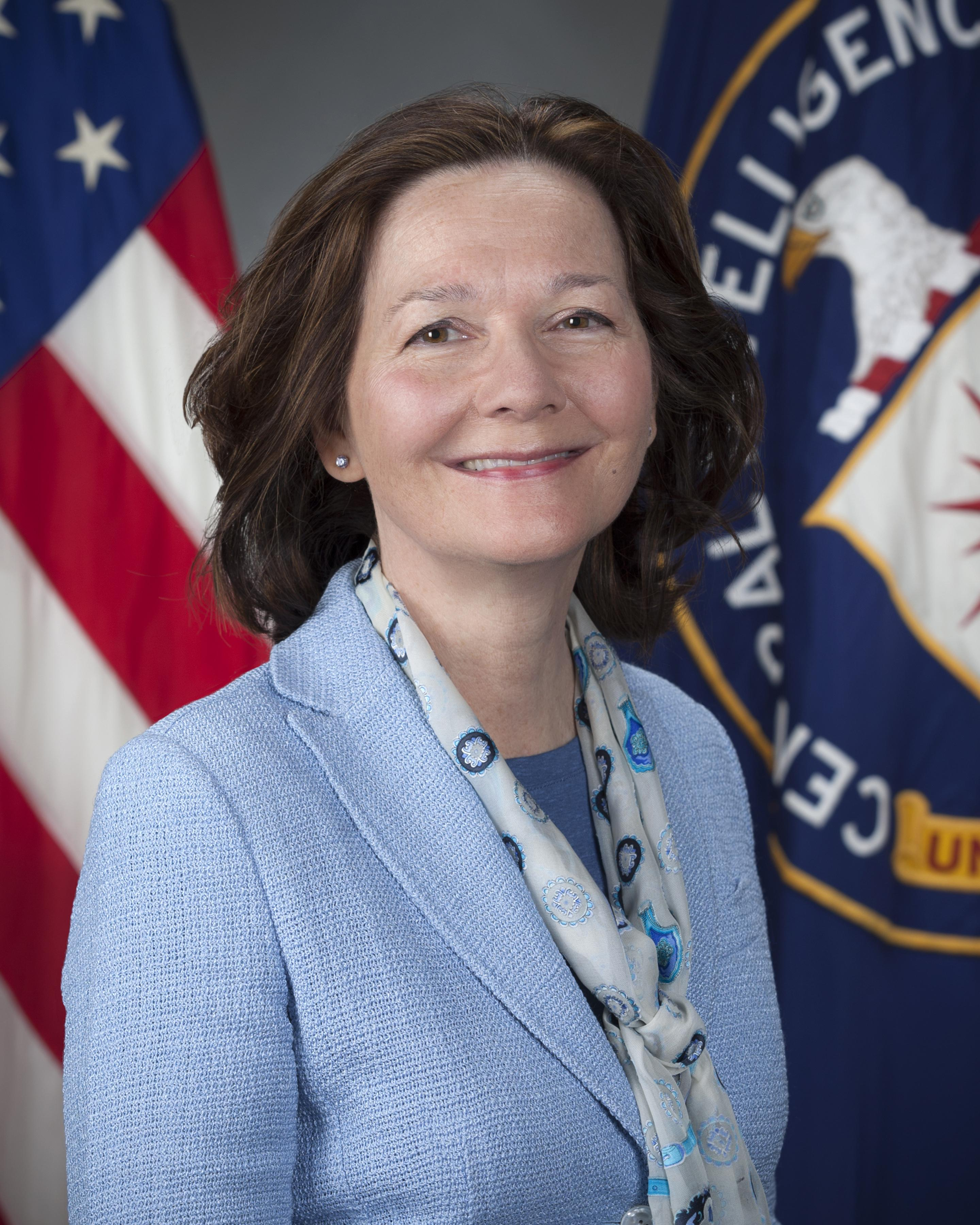
- Official portrait, 2017

7th Director of the Central Intelligence Agency
- In office April 26, 2018 – January 20, 2021 (Note: Acting: April 26, 2018 – May 21, 2018)
- President: Donald Trump
- Deputy: Vaughn Bishop
- Preceded by: Mike Pompeo
- Succeeded by: Bill Burns

6th Deputy Director of the Central Intelligence Agency
- In office February 2, 2017 – May 21, 2018
- President: Donald Trump
- Preceded by: David Cohen
- Succeeded by: Vaughn Bishop

Director of the National Clandestine Service
- Acting
- In office February 28, 2013 – May 7, 2013
- President: Barack Obama
- Preceded by: John Bennett
- Succeeded by: Frank Archibald

Personal details
- Born: Gina Cheri Walker; October 1, 1956 (age 70) Ashland, Kentucky, U.S.
- Spouse: Jeff Haspel (m. 1976; div. 1985)
- Education: University of Kentucky (attended); University of Louisville (BA); Northeastern University (GrCert)
- Awards: Presidential Rank Award; Donovan Award; Intelligence Medal of Merit
- Haspel's voice Haspel's opening statement at her confirmation hearing to be CIA director. Recorded May 9, 2018

Gina Cheri Walker Haspel (born October 1, 1956) is an American national security expert who was the seventh director of the Central Intelligence Agency (CIA) from May 21, 2018, to January 20, 2021. She was previously the agency's deputy director from 2017 to 2018 under Mike Pompeo, and became acting director on April 26, 2018, after Pompeo became U.S. secretary of state. Following her nomination and confirmation to the role, she was appointed by President Donald Trump as the first woman to become CIA director on a permanent basis.

== Early life ==
Haspel was born Gina Cheri Walker on October 1, 1956, in Ashland, Kentucky. Her father served in the United States Air Force. She has four siblings.

Haspel attended high school in the United Kingdom. She was a student at the University of Kentucky for three years and transferred for her senior year to the University of Louisville, where she graduated in May 1978 with a Bachelor of Science in languages and journalism. From 1980 to 1981, she worked as a civilian library coordinator at Fort Devens in Massachusetts. She received a paralegal certificate from Northeastern University in 1982 and worked as a paralegal until she was hired by the CIA.

== Early career ==
Career timeline

=== Early CIA career ===
Haspel joined the CIA in January 1985 as a reports officer. She held several undercover overseas positions. Her first field assignment was from 1987 to 1989 in Ethiopia, Central Eurasia, Turkey, followed by several assignments in Europe and Central Eurasia from 1990 to 2001. From 1996 to 1998, Haspel served as station chief in Baku, Azerbaijan.

From 2001 to 2003, her position was listed as Deputy Group Chief, Counterterrorism Center.

Between October and December 2002, Haspel was assigned to oversee a secret CIA prison in Thailand Detention Site GREEN, code-named Cat's Eye, which housed persons suspected of involvement in Al-Qaeda. The prison was part of the US government's "extraordinary rendition" program after the September 11 attacks, and used torture techniques such as waterboarding. According to a former senior CIA official, Haspel arrived as station chief after the interrogation of Abu Zubaydah but was chief during the waterboarding of Abd al-Rahim al-Nashiri.

On January 8, 2019, Carol Rosenberg of the Miami Herald reported that partially redacted transcripts from a pre-trial hearing of Khalid Sheikh Mohammed by the Guantanamo Military Commission seemed to indicate that sometime during the 2003–2004 period, Haspel had been the "Chief of Base" of a clandestine CIA detention site on the Guantanamo Bay Naval Station.

==== Torture and destruction of evidence controversy ====
Memo on Haspel's involvement in destruction of tapes

She has attracted controversy for her involvement in the use of torture in 2002, as Deputy Group Chief of the Counterterrorism Mission Center. During that year, she was chief of a CIA black site in Thailand where prisoners were tortured with so-called "enhanced interrogation techniques", including waterboarding. At that time, the Bush Administration considered the techniques legal based on a set of secret, now-rescinded legal opinions which expansively defined executive authority and narrowly defined torture. Haspel's involvement was confirmed in August 2018 when a Freedom of Information lawsuit by the George Washington University-based National Security Archive brought to light CIA cables either authorized or written by Haspel while base chief at the Thailand black site. The cables describe acts of deliberate physical torture of detainees, including waterboarding and confinement, which Haspel personally observed.

In late October 2002, Haspel became chief of base for that "black site" CIA prison located in Thailand. She worked at a site that was codenamed "Cat's Eye", which would later become known as the place where suspected al Qaeda terrorist members Abd al-Rahim al-Nashiri and Abu Zubaydah were detained and tortured with waterboarding. In early February 2017, The New York Times and ProPublica reported that these waterboardings were both conducted under Haspel. In March 2018, US officials said Haspel was not involved in the torture of Zubaydah, as she only became chief of base after Zubaydah was tortured. ProPublica and The New York Times issued corrections to their stories but noted that Haspel was involved in the torture of al-Nashiri. In August 2018, cables from the site, dating from November 2002 and likely authorized by if not written by Haspel, were released due to a Freedom of Information lawsuit, and described the torture of Nashiri in detail, including slamming him against a wall, confining him to a small box, waterboarding him, and depriving him of sleep and clothing, while threatening to turn him over to others who would kill him. Interrogators involved would also call Nashiri "a little girl", "a spoiled little rich Saudi", and a "sissy".

Haspel played a role in the destruction of 92 interrogation videotapes that showed the torture of detainees both at the black site she ran and at other secret agency locations. A partially-declassified CIA document shows that the instruction for a new method of record keeping at the black site in Thailand, re-recording over the videos, took place in late October 2002, soon after Haspel's arrival.

In December 2014, the European Center for Constitutional and Human Rights (ECCHR), a non-governmental organization that uses litigation to seek enforcement of human rights, asked that criminal charges be brought against unidentified CIA operatives after the US Senate Select Committee published its report on torture by US intelligence agencies. On June 7, 2017, the ECCHR called on the Public Prosecutor General of Germany to issue an arrest warrant against Haspel over claims she oversaw the torture of terrorism suspects. The accusation against her was centered on the case of Saudi national Abu Zubaydah. No such arrest warrant was issued.

On May 1, 2018, Spencer Ackerman, writing in The Daily Beast, reported that former CIA analyst Gail Helt had been told some of the controversial torture recordings had not been destroyed, after all. On May 9, 2018, the day prior to Haspel's confirmation vote, The New York Times reported that Khalid Sheikh Mohammed, architect of the 9/11 attacks, requested to submit six paragraphs of information for the Senate committee to review before its vote. She testified many years later to the U.S. Senate about this subject:

I don't believe that torture works....Having served in that tumultuous time, I can offer you my personal commitment, clearly and without reservation, that under my leadership CIA will not restart such a detention and interrogation program.

After her service in Thailand, she served from 2004 to 2005 as Deputy Chief of the CIA's National Resources Division. She served as an operations officer in Counterterrorism Center near Washington, D.C. She later served as the CIA's station chief in London and, in 2011, New York.

=== National Clandestine Service leadership ===
Haspel served as the deputy director of the National Clandestine Service, deputy director of the National Clandestine Service for Foreign Intelligence and Covert Action, and chief of staff for the director of the National Clandestine Service.

In 2005, Haspel was the chief of staff to Jose Rodriguez, Director of the National Clandestine Service. In his memoir, Rodriguez wrote that Haspel had drafted a cable in 2005 ordering the destruction of dozens of videotapes made at the black site in Thailand in response to mounting public scrutiny of the program. At the Senate confirmation hearing considering her nomination to head the CIA, Haspel explained that the tapes had been destroyed in order to protect the identities of CIA officers whose faces were visible, at a time when leaks of US intelligence were rampant.

In 2013, John Brennan, then the director of Central Intelligence, named Haspel as acting director of the National Clandestine Service, which carries out covert operations around the globe. However, she was not appointed to the position permanently due to criticism about her involvement in the Rendition, Detention and Interrogation program. Her permanent appointment was opposed by Dianne Feinstein and others in the Senate.

=== Deputy Director of the CIA ===
On February 2, 2017, President Trump appointed Haspel Deputy Director of the CIA, a position that does not require Senate confirmation. In an official statement released that day, House Permanent Select Committee on Intelligence Chairman Devin Nunes (R-CA) said:

With more than thirty years of service to the CIA and extensive overseas experience, Gina has worked closely with the House Intelligence Committee and has impressed us with her dedication, forthrightness, and her deep commitment to the Intelligence Community. She is undoubtedly the right person for the job, and the Committee looks forward to working with her in the future.

On February 8, 2017, several members of the Senate intelligence committee urged Trump to reconsider his appointment of Haspel as deputy director. Senator Sheldon Whitehouse (D-RI) quoted colleagues Ron Wyden (D-OR) and Martin Heinrich (D-NM) who were on the committee:

I am especially concerned by reports that this individual was involved in the unauthorized destruction of CIA interrogation videotapes, which documented the CIA's use of torture against two CIA detainees. My colleagues Senators Wyden and Heinrich have stated that classified information details why the newly appointed Deputy Director is 'unsuitable' for the position and have requested that this information is declassified. I join their request.

On February 15, 2017, Spencer Ackerman reported on psychologists Bruce Jessen and James Mitchell, the architects of the "enhanced interrogation" program that was designed to break Zubaydah and was subsequently used on other detainees at the CIA's secret prisons around the world. Jessen and Mitchell are being sued by Sulaiman Abdulla Salim, Mohamed Ahmed Ben Soud, and Obaid Ullah over torture designed by the psychologists. Jessen and Mitchell are seeking to compel Haspel, and her colleague James Cotsana, to testify on their behalf.

== Director of the CIA ==
=== Nomination ===
Haspel's letter to Sen. Warner

On March 13, 2018, President Donald Trump announced that he would nominate Haspel to be the Director of the Central Intelligence Agency, replacing Mike Pompeo, who he had tapped to become the new Secretary of State. Once confirmed by the Senate, Haspel became the first woman to serve as permanent Director of the CIA after 33 years of service to the agency. (Meroe Park served as Associate Deputy Director from 2013 to 2017, and acting director for three days in January 2017). Robert Baer, who once supervised Haspel at the CIA, found her to be "smart, tough, and effective. Foreign liaison services who have worked with her uniformly walked away impressed.".

Republican senator Rand Paul said that he would oppose the nomination, saying: "To really appoint the head cheerleader for waterboarding to be head of the CIA? I mean, how could you trust somebody who did that to be in charge of the CIA? To read of her glee during the waterboarding is just absolutely appalling." Soon after Paul made this statement, the allegation that Haspel had mocked those being interrogated was retracted. Doug Stafford, an aide for Paul, said: "According to multiple published, undisputed accounts, she oversaw a black site and she further destroyed evidence of torture. This should preclude her from ever running the CIA."

Republican senator and former presidential candidate John McCain called on Haspel to provide a detailed account of her participation in the CIA's detention program from 2001 to 2009, including whether she directed the use of so-called "enhanced interrogation techniques" and to clarify her role in the 2005 destruction of interrogation videotapes. In the Senate, McCain was a staunch opponent of torture, having been tortured as a prisoner of war in North Vietnam. McCain further called upon Haspel to commit to declassifying the 2014 Senate Intelligence Committee report on CIA torture.

Multiple senators have criticized the CIA for what they believe is selectivity in declassifying superficial and positive information about her career to generate positive coverage, while simultaneously refusing to declassify any "meaningful" information about her career.

=== Support from the intelligence community ===
More than 50 former senior U.S. government officials, including six former Directors of the CIA and three former directors of national intelligence, signed a letter supporting her nomination. They included former Directors of the CIA John Brennan, Leon Panetta and Michael Morell, former Director of the NSA and CIA Michael Hayden, and former Director of National Intelligence James Clapper. In April, a group of 109 retired generals and admirals signed a letter expressing "profound concern" over Haspel's nomination due to her record and alleged involvement in the CIA's use of torture and the subsequent destruction of evidence. Fairness and Accuracy in Reporting criticized press coverage that portrayed Haspel's nomination as a victory for feminism. On May 10, The Washington Post Editorial Board expressed its opposition to Haspel's nomination for not condemning the CIA's now-defunct torture program as immoral. On May 12, the first two Senate Democrats, Joe Donnelly of Indiana and Joe Manchin of West Virginia, announced their support for Haspel's nomination.

=== Confirmation ===
On May 9, 2018, Haspel appeared before the Senate Intelligence Committee for a confirmation hearing.

On May 14, Haspel sent a letter to Senator Mark Warner of Virginia stating that, in hindsight, the CIA should not have operated its interrogation and detention program. Shortly thereafter, Warner announced he would back Haspel when the Senate Intelligence Committee voted on whether to refer her nomination to the full Senate.

She was approved for confirmation by the Senate Intelligence Committee on May 16 by a 10–5 vote, with two Democrats voting in favor. The next day, Haspel was confirmed by the full Senate, on a mostly party-line, 54–45 vote. Paul and Jeff Flake of Arizona were the only Republican nays, and six Democrats — Donnelly, Manchin, Warner, Heidi Heitkamp of North Dakota, Bill Nelson of Florida, and Jeanne Shaheen of New Hampshire — voted yes. McCain, who had urged his colleagues to reject her nomination, did not cast a vote, as he was hospitalized at the time.

=== Tenure ===
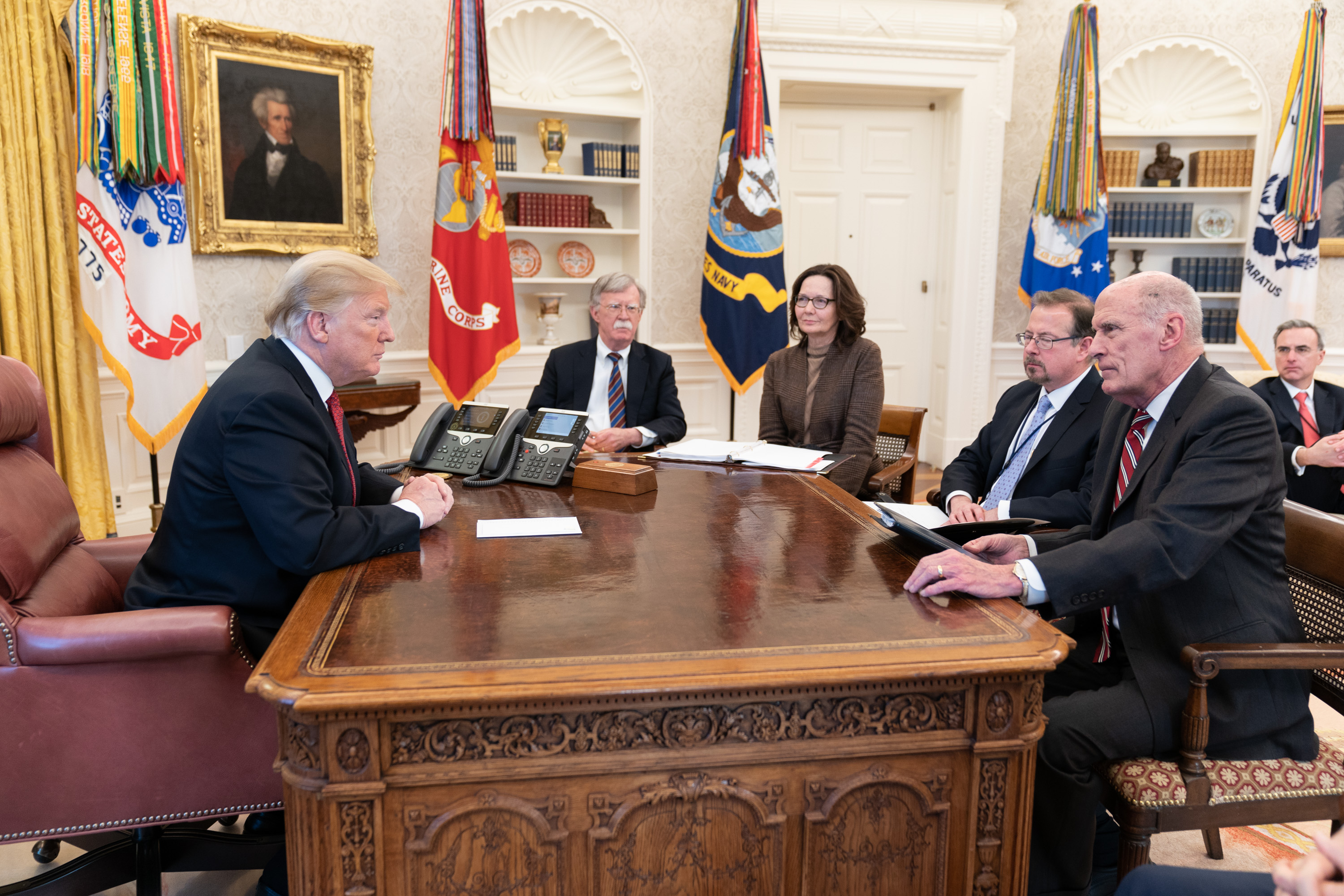
Haspel in a meeting with President Donald Trump, John Bolton, and Dan Coats, January 2019

Haspel was officially sworn in on May 21, 2018, becoming the first woman to serve as Director of the Central Intelligence Agency on a permanent basis.

On January 29, 2019, during a Senate Intelligence Committee hearing, Haspel reported that the CIA was "pleased" with the first Trump administration's March 2018 expulsion of 61 Russian diplomats following the poisoning of Sergei and Yulia Skripal. Haspel added that the CIA did not object to the Treasury Department's decision in December 2018 to remove sanctions on three Russian companies tied to Russian oligarch Oleg Deripaska, a close associate of Russian President Vladimir Putin. On the subject of recent relations between North Korea and the United States, Haspel stated, "I think our analysts would assess that they value the dialogue with the United States, and we do see indications that Kim Jong-un is trying to navigate a path toward some kind of better future for the North Korean people."

By May 2019, Haspel had hired many women in senior positions.

In December 2020, she became the subject of a death hoax. According to social media claims, Haspel was either killed, injured, or arrested in a CIA raid on a server farm in Frankfurt. Several fact-checking projects debunked these claims, and were unable to find any evidence that Haspel had died or that a raid had taken place. The CIA announced her retirement after 36 years of service, via a tweet, on January 19, 2021, one day prior to the presidential transition from Trump to Joe Biden. William J. Burns had been selected by Biden on January 11 to succeed Haspel pending Senate confirmation. Burns was sworn in as the new director on March 19, 2021.

After retiring from the CIA, Haspel joined the law firm King & Spalding in July 2021, where she has advised clients on information technology and cybersecurity. As of 2024, her title at King & Spalding was "Senior National Security Advisor."

== Awards and recognition ==
Haspel has received a number of awards, including the George H. W. Bush Award for excellence in counterterrorism, the Donovan Award, the Intelligence Medal of Merit, and the Presidential Rank Award.

== Personal life ==
Haspel married Jeff Haspel, who served in the United States Army, c. 1976; they were divorced in 1985. She resides in Ashburn, Virginia.

== See also ==
- Criticism of the war on terror
- Extrajudicial prisoners of the United States
- Senate Intelligence Committee report on CIA torture

== Notes ==
Government offices
| Preceded by John Bennett | Director of the National Clandestine Service; Acting; 2013 | Succeeded by Frank Archibald |
| Preceded by David Cohen | Deputy Director of the Central Intelligence Agency; 2017–2018 | Succeeded by Vaughn Bishop |
| Preceded by Mike Pompeo | 7th Director of the Central Intelligence Agency; 2018–2021 | Succeeded by William J. Burns |
