= Deuce Martinez =

American intelligence professional (born c. 1976)

- Born: c. 1976 (age 49–50)
- Occupation: Intelligence professional

Deuce Martinez (born c. 1976) is an American intelligence professional. "Deuce" is not his given first name, but a nickname that was used in the first newspaper article naming him. He was involved at the start of the Central Intelligence Agency's Rendition, Detention and Interrogation program of "high-value detainees," including Abu Zubaydah, Ramzi bin al-Shibh, Abd al-Rahim al-Nashiri, and Khalid Sheikh Mohammed.

== CIA career ==
Martinez worked as an analyst in the CIA Counternarcotics Center. He tracked suspected drug traffickers through electronic communications and documents. After al-Qaeda's attacks on September 11, 2001, he was transferred to the Counterterrorism Center, where he used those same techniques to find members of al-Qaeda. In early 2002, he went to Pakistan to be part of the team that located and captured Abu Zubaydah.

At a black site in Thailand, Abu Zubaydah was first interrogated by the FBI. Eventually, CIA employees and contractors took over and began the torture of Abu Zubaydah and the FBI agents left. At that point, "enhanced interrogation techniques" such as waterboarding were used on Abu Zubaydah. Martinez never employed these methods himself, rather he attempted traditional trust-building interrogations after the coercive methods stopped.

He interrogated Ramzi bin al-Shibh, who cooperated without resorting to coercive interrogation methods. He also interrogated Abd al-Rahim al-Nashiri and Khalid Sheikh Mohammed after they had been tortured.

Martinez eventually left the CIA and went to work for Mitchell Jessen and Associates, a consulting company run by former military psychologists Jim Mitchell and Bruce Jessen. Mitchell and Jessen created the "enhanced interrogation techniques" program and were present at the black site in Thailand with Martinez when they were used for the first time on Abu Zubaydah.

== Identity ==
The first published information about Martinez came from a June 22, 2008 New York Times article written by Scott Shane. In a concurrent editors' note, the New York Times stated that they were asked, by the CIA and a lawyer representing Martinez, to obfuscate his identity for the article so that Martinez could protect his reputation. The newspaper considered this, but ultimately declined, although they did not use his given first name, but his nickname, "Deuce." The editors stated that Martinez had never operated undercover and the story's credibility required using his real name.

On January 23, 2012, the Department of Justice charged ex-CIA officer John Kiriakou with providing Martinez's name to the New York Times for the story. Scott Shane later wrote that he already knew Martinez' name before he contacted Kiriakou:

I asked [Kiriakou] about an interrogator whose name I had heard: Deuce Martinez. He said that they had worked together to catch Abu Zubaydah, and that he would be a great source on Mr. Mohammed, the architect of the Sept. 11 attacks. He was able to dig up the business card Mr. Martinez had given him with contact information at Mitchell Jessen and Associates, the C.I.A. contractor that helped devise the torture program and Mr. Martinez’s new employer. Mr. Martinez, an analyst by training and torturer by trade, was retired and had never served under cover; that is, he had never posed as a diplomat or a businessman while overseas. He had placed his home address, his personal e-mail address, his job as an intelligence officer and other personal details on a public Web site for the use of students at his alma mater. Abu Zubaydah had been captured six years earlier, Mr. Mohammed five years earlier; their stories were far from secret. Mr. Martinez never agreed to talk to me. But a few e-mail exchanges with Mr. Kiriakou as I hunted for his former colleague would eventually turn up in Mr. Kiriakou’s indictment; he was charged with revealing to me that Mr. Martinez had participated in the operation to catch Abu Zubaydah, a fact that the government said was classified.

These charges were dropped in exchange for Kiriakou's guilty plea to a leak involving a different CIA agent who was undercover.
