= John Leso =

American psychologist

John Francis Leso (born August 13, 1966) is an American psychologist and a major in the United States Armed Services, who is reported to have aided interrogators at Guantanamo Bay detention camp. Leso co-authored an October 2002 memo which "recommended physically and psychologically harmful and abusive detention and interrogation tactics", which were used on Mohammed al-Qahtani, the alleged 20th hijacker. Information on Al-Qahtani's interrogation became public when a classified interrogation log was leaked to Time. Leso's name was included in the leaked log, which triggered debate in the medical community about the role of psychologists in supporting military interrogations. Debate is ongoing about the effectiveness and ethics of the interrogation techniques used with Al-Qhatani, as many consider them torture. Although some activist psychologists have criticized Leso for "directing" the interrogation of Al-Qhatani, scrutiny of public sources on the matter reveals that Leso's actual role and duties remain unclear.

== Academic career ==
Leso attended Johns Hopkins University. Upon completion of his undergraduate degree Leso was commissioned as a Second Lieutenant. He received a Ph.D. in psychology from SUNY, in Albany New York, in 1995.

== Professional career ==
Staff Psychologist at Walter Reed	In 2003 Leso was a staff psychologist at the Walter Reed Medical Center, in Maryland.
Austrian Embassy	On August 24, 2005, a newsletter from the Albany University Psychology Department stated: "...and John Leso left Walter Reed and is now working in the U.S. Embassy in Austria."

== See also ==
- Larry C. James
- Nuremberg Code
- Bruce Jessen
- James Elmer Mitchell
- Behavioral Science Consultation Team

== Bibliography ==
- James, L.C. (2008) Fixing Hell: An Army Psychologist Confronts Abu Ghraib. Grand Central Publishing.
