= Suleiman Abdullah Salim =

Extra judicial detainee of the CIA

Suleiman Abdullah Salim is a citizen of Tanzania who was held in extrajudicial detention, for five years, in secret CIA black sites. Salim was one of the individuals the United States Senate Intelligence Committee's inquiry into the CIA's use of torture identified as having been subjected to the most brutal torture. According to James Risen, in the New York Times CIA interrogators tortured him, even though he was a black African man, and the Suleiman Abdullah Salim they had intended to capture was an ethnically Arab man from Yemen.

== Life prior to capture ==
Salim was born in Stone Town, Tanzania. He took his first job, as a fisherman, when he was a young teenager. He worked in a clothing store, in Dar es Salaam. He later worked in Mombasa, as a water porter. He had to leave a job as a harbor pilot, in Kismayu, Somalia, due to resentment from the local warlord's militiamen. In 2003 he was working as a driver for an employee of Mohammed Dheere, a Somali warlord. Dheere's men accused him of owing Dheere money, and when he refused to be shaken down, they handed him over the CIA.

== CIA custody ==
When the CIA first reported his apprehension they said he was a Yemeni, named "Suleiman Abdalla Salim Hemed". Salim said that, when he was first turned over to the Americans they accused him of finding a way to alter his appearance.

== Post-release ==
On October 13, 2015, the American Civil Liberties Union filed a lawsuit against the psychologists who designed the interrogations, James E. Mitchell and Bruce Jessen, on behalf of Salim, Mohamed Ahmed Ben Soud, and the estate of Gul Rahman. On July 28, 2017, U.S. District Judge Justin Lowe Quackenbush denied both parties motions for summary judgment, noted that the defendants are indemnified by the United States government, and encouraged the attorneys to reach a settlement before trial.
