= John Kiriakou =

American ex-CIA officer and whistleblower (born 1964)

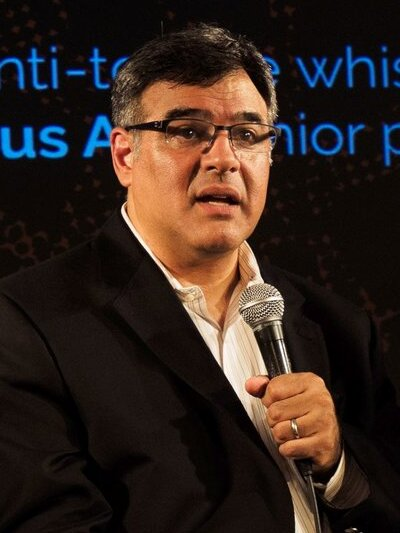
- Kiriakou in 2017
- Born: John Chris Kiriakou; August 9, 1964 (age 62); Sharon, Pennsylvania, U.S.
- Citizenship: United States; Greece (since 2012)
- Education: George Washington University (BA, MA)
- Occupations: Intelligence officer; author; writer
- Employers: Central Intelligence Agency (1990–2004); Senate Foreign Relations Committee (2009–2011)
- Known for: CIA torture disclosure
- Criminal charges: Disclosing classified information (Note: Violating the Intelligence Identities Protection Act.)
- Criminal penalty: 30 months (2 ½ years)
- Criminal status: Served 28 months (three months in home confinement)
- Children: 5
- Awards: Counterterrorism Service Medal; Meritorious Honor Award; CIA Exceptional Performance Award (10); CIA Sustained Superior Performance Award

YouTube information
- Channel: John Kiriakou
- Years active: 2025–present
- Genres: Politics; history; education
- Subscribers: 473,000
- Views: 25.76 million
- Last updated: November 21, 2026
- Website: johnkiriakou.com

John Chris Kiriakou (/kiriˈɑːkuː/ kee-ree-AH-koo; born August 9, 1964) is an American former Central Intelligence Agency (CIA) officer, author, podcaster and whistleblower.

In 2007, Kiriakou exposed the CIA's use of waterboarding at black sites as part of the broader enhanced interrogation techniques employed during the war on terror. In 2012, Kiriakou was federally indicted for violating the Intelligence Identities Protection Act, receiving a sentence of 30 months in prison after entering a plea deal. After his two-year imprisonment ended in 2015, Kiriakou received multiple awards recognizing his whistleblowing, including PEN's First Amendment Award and the Sam Adams Award.

Kiriakou joined the CIA's Counterterrorism Center in 1990 as an intelligence analyst. He became the chief of counterterrorism operations in Pakistan following the September 11 terrorist attacks and led the capture of Abu Zubaydah, who was then believed to be a high-ranking al-Qaeda member. In 2004, Kiriakou left the CIA, to join the private sector thereafter. In 2009, he rejoined the U.S. federal government as a senior investigator for the Senate Foreign Relations Committee under John Kerry.

Since his release from prison, Kiriakou has been an activist on issues of intelligence, whistleblowing, prison reform, civil liberties, covert foreign policy, and the national security state in the aftermath of the September 11 attacks. After running a podcast for Russian state-owned Sputnik, he began his own podcast shows. In 2026, edited clips of Kiriakou on podcasts such as The Joe Rogan Experience and The Diary of a CEO went viral online.

== Early life ==
John Chris Kiriakou was born on August 9, 1964, in Sharon, Pennsylvania, and is of Greek descent. He was raised in New Castle, Pennsylvania. He is the oldest son of Christos and Stella Kiriakou. Both of his parents were elementary school teachers; his father became an elementary school principal. His grandparents had immigrated from Greece. His younger brother is the musician Emanuel Kiriakou. He also has a sister, Tina.

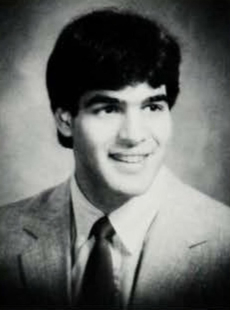
Kiriakou in the George Washington University yearbook, 1986

Kiriakou attended New Castle High School, where he was a member of its American Field Service program, debate society, Key Club, and played baseball. He was an honors student in high school and also played in the school band. In his autobiography, Kiriakou recalled viewing the Iranian Revolution on television as a teenager as a pivotal event which began his interest in international affairs. After high school, he received a scholarship to attend George Washington University (GWU), where he majored in Middle Eastern studies. He received his bachelor's degree in Middle Eastern studies from the Elliott School of International Affairs at GWU in 1986 and, in 1988, obtained a master's degree in legislative affairs from the same university.

As an undergraduate, Kiriakou completed a Greek-language program at Georgetown University and spent his junior year studying abroad at the University of London. He was also the vice president of the College Democrats chapter at George Washington University, during which time he hosted George McGovern. He briefly worked as a high school teacher before joining the CIA, and taught actor Jared Leto, who considered him his favorite teacher.

== Intelligence career ==
=== CIA career (1990–2004) ===
After obtaining his master's degree, Kiriakou accepted a job as a federal investigator at the U.S. Office of Personnel Management in May 1988. However, he withdrew after Jerrold Post, a CIA psychiatrist who taught him in a psychology course at George Washington University, identified him as a potential candidate to be recruited into the CIA and recommended him to the Directorate of Intelligence. On January 7, 1990, Kiriakou began working as a leadership analyst at the agency focusing on the Persian Gulf.

Kiriakou spent the first eight years of his career as a Middle East analyst focusing on Iraq. He learned Arabic and, from 1994 to 1996, was assigned to the U.S. Embassy in Manama, Bahrain, as an economic officer. He returned to Washington, D.C. to work on Iraq until 1998, when he transferred to the CIA's Directorate of Operations. He then became a counter-terrorism operations officer and worked in Athens, Greece, where the CIA targeted 17N and other Greek left-wing terrorist groups, and spied on secular Palestinian revolutionaries. In 2000, Kiriakou returned to CIA headquarters.

Following the September 11 terrorist attacks, Kiriakou became Chief of Counterterrorist Operations in Pakistan. In that position, he led a series of military raids on al-Qaeda safehouses, capturing dozens of al-Qaeda fighters. Kiriakou led a raid on the night of March 28, 2002, in Faisalabad, Pakistan, capturing Abu Zubaydah, then thought to be al-Qaeda's third-ranking official. He left the CIA in 2004.

=== Work after the CIA ===
From 2004 until 2008, Kiriakou was a senior manager at Deloitte & Touche's competitive intelligence practice. During that time, he also worked as an adviser for several Hollywood films, such as Brüno and Kite Runner. From September 2008 until March 2009 and April 2011 to April 2012, Kiriakou was a terrorism consultant for ABC News.

Following Senator John Kerry's (D-MA) ascension to the chair of the Senate Foreign Relations Committee in 2009, Kiriakou became the committee's senior United States Senate investigator, focusing on the Middle East, international terrorism, piracy, and counter-narcotics issues. In 2011, he left the committee to become managing partner of Rhodes Global Consulting, an Arlington, Virginia-based political risk analysis firm.

== Whistleblowing ==
=== Background ===
In 2006, senior law enforcement agents with the Criminal Investigation Task Force told MSNBC.com that they had been cautioning against the use of enhanced interrogation methods since 2002, within the U.S. Department of Defense, and that the interrogation tactics used in Guantanamo Bay by a separate team of military intelligence investigators were unproductive, not likely to produce any reliable information, and probably illegal. Having found responses from army commanders running the detainee camp unsatisfactory, they took their concerns to David Brant, director of the Naval Criminal Investigative Service (NCIS), who alerted Navy General Counsel Alberto J. Mora. On December 6, 2007, The New York Times advised the Bush administration that they had acquired and planned to publish information about the destruction of tapes made of Zubaydah's interrogation, which were believed to show instances of waterboarding and other forms of possible torture.

=== December 2007 ABC News interview ===
On December 10, 2007, Kiriakou gave an interview to ABC News, in which he described his participation in the capture of Abu Zubaydah, who was accused of having been an aide to al-Qaeda leader Osama bin Laden. Kiriakou said that he did not witness Zubaydah's interrogation in Guantanamo Bay, but had been told by CIA associates that it had taken only a single brief instance of waterboarding to extract answers. In 2009, it was reported that Abu Zubaydah had been waterboarded at least 83 times. The treatment "broke" Zubaydah, although the torture generated little or no additional useful information to what was already known.

Kiriakou was the first U.S. government official to confirm that waterboarding was used to torture prisoners at CIA black sites during interrogations. Following the interview, Kiriakou's accounts of Abu Zubaydah's waterboarding were widely repeated and paraphrased on social media. (Note: "... The waterboarding lasted about 35 seconds before Abu Zubaida broke down, according to Kiriakou, who said he was given a detailed description of the incident by fellow team members. The next day, Abu Zubaida told his captors he would tell them whatever they wanted ... He said that Allah had come to him in his cell and told him to cooperate, because it would make things easier for his brothers ...") In the following months, he became a regular guest expert on news and public affairs shows on the topics of interrogation and counter-terrorism.

Kiriakou has said that he chose not to follow internal whistleblowing procedures to report claims of torture because he believed he "wouldn't have gotten anywhere"; his superiors and the congressional intelligence committees were already aware of the methods.

==== Subsequent correspondence with journalists ====
After the ABC News interview, Kiriakou exchanged emails with reporters Matthew Cole, Richard Esposito, and Scott Shane. In the emails, Kiriakou disclosed the names of former CIA colleagues who had participated in the detention and interrogation program; with at least one CIA employee still undercover at the time. The freelance writer then shared the name with lawyers representing detainees held at Guantanamo Bay. The name then appeared in a sealed legal filing submitted by the defense attorneys. Although the name was not made public at the time, the disclosure alerted federal officials to a leak, and the resulting federal investigation led to Kiriakou's arrest. The name that was disclosed appeared on The New York Times website in October 2011.

=== 2012 indictment and subsequent conviction ===
On January 23, 2012, Kiriakou was charged with disclosing classified information to journalists, including the name of a covert CIA officer and information revealing the role of another CIA employee, Deuce Martinez, in classified activities. In addition, Kiriakou was alleged to have lied to the CIA in order to have his book published. His criminal defense lawyer was Robert Trout. Another member of his defense team, Jesselyn Radack, told Politico that the government was wrong to deny Kiriakou whistleblower status.

According to PEN America:

The specific charges were that in 2008, Kiriakou confirmed the name of a CIA officer—which was already well known to people in the human rights community, according to the Government Accountability Project—to someone who claimed to be writing a book about the agency's rendition practices. In a separate 2008 incident, Kiriakou gave a New York Times journalist the business card of a CIA agent who worked for a "private government contractor known for its involvement in torture." That agent had never been undercover and his contact information and affiliation with the CIA was already publicly available on the Internet. Kiriakou faced up to 45 years in prison and millions of dollars in legal fees for these charges.

On April 5, 2012, Kiriakou was indicted for one count of violating the Intelligence Identities Protection Act, three counts of violating the Espionage Act, and one count of making false statements for allegedly lying to the Publications Review Board of the CIA. He initially pleaded not guilty to all charges and was released on bail. Starting September 12, 2012, the District Court for the Eastern District of Virginia conducted a closed Classified Information Procedures Act hearing for Kiriakou's case.

On October 22, 2012, Kiriakou agreed to plead guilty to one count of passing classified information to the media thereby violating the Intelligence Identities Protection Act; his plea deal spared journalists from testifying in a trial. All other charges were dropped. He was sentenced to 30 months in prison on January 25, 2013, making him the second CIA employee in history to be jailed for revealing classified material of CIA undercover identities in violation of the Intelligence Identities Protection Act.

=== Imprisonment ===
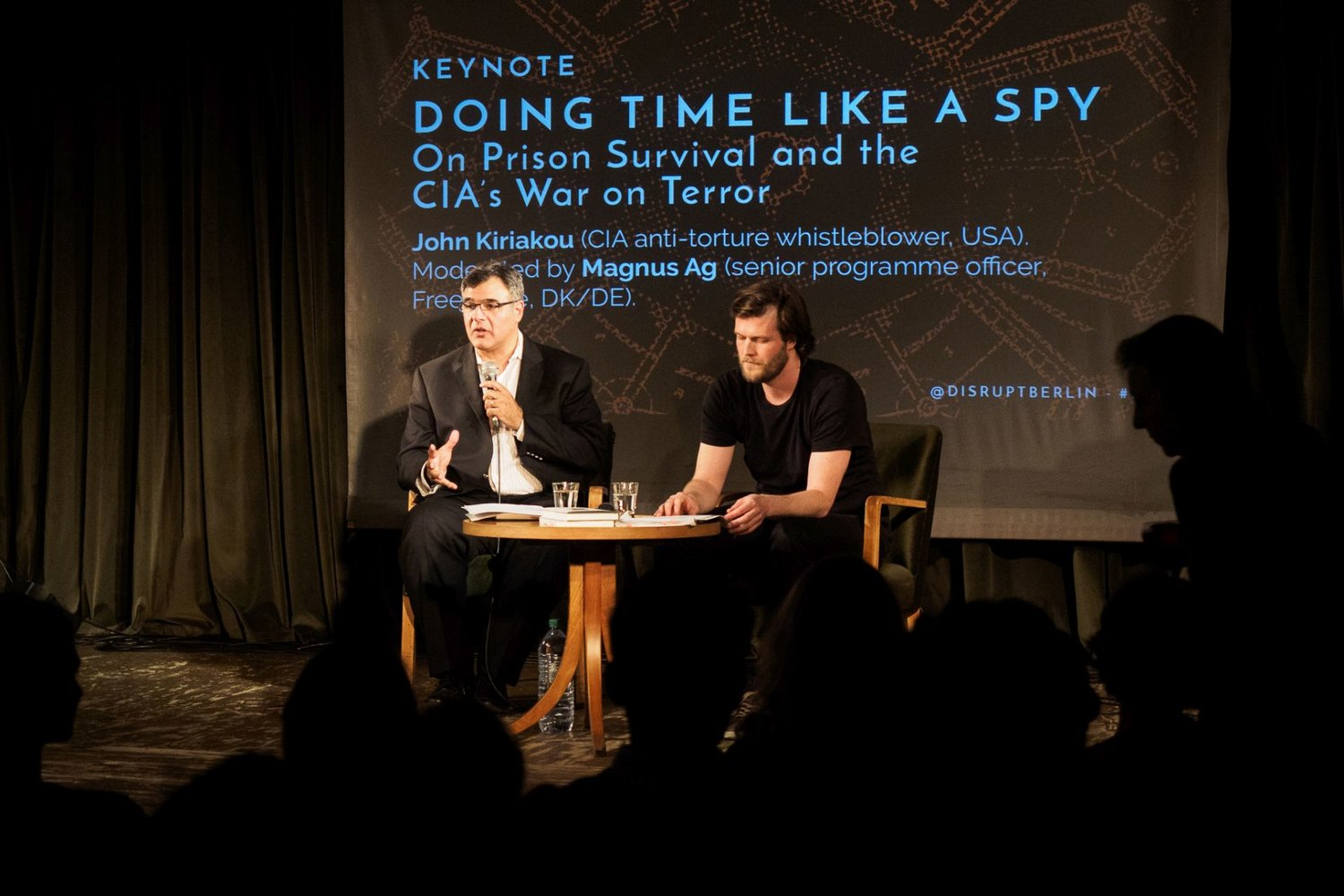
John Kiriakou talking on prison survival and whistleblowing at the Disruption Network Lab, Berlin, 2017

In January 2013, Bruce Riedel, a former CIA analyst and intelligence adviser to Barack Obama, sent the president a letter signed by eighteen other CIA veterans urging that Kiriakou's sentence be commuted. Kiriakou received a prison "send off" party at the exclusive Hay–Adams Hotel in Washington, D.C., hosted by political peace activists dressed in orange jumpsuits and mock prison costumes.

On February 28, 2013, Kiriakou began serving his term at the low-security Federal Correctional Institution, Loretto, in Loretto, Pennsylvania. While in prison, Kiriakou wrote letters that were published online, including one to the whistleblower Edward Snowden, in which he expressed his support and gave advice.

On February 3, 2015, Kiriakou was released from prison to serve three months of house arrest at his home in Arlington, Virginia. Following his release, Kiriakou said his case was not about leaking information but about exposing torture, continuing, "and I would do it all over again." He has since expressed interest in campaigning for prison reform.

New York Times reporter Scott Shane has referenced the Kiriakou case as an instance of Obama's prosecutions of journalism-related leaking having a chilling effect on coverage of national security issues.

== Post-release career ==
Following his release, Kiriakou briefly worked for the Institute for Policy Studies, before joining Russian state-owned Radio Sputnik. After leaving Sputnik, he later started his own podcast shows in addition to appearing on leading podcasts such as The Joe Rogan Experience and The Diary of a CEO. In 2026, he became an internet personality when edited clips of Kiriakou recounting his experiences went viral on social media platforms.

In early 2026, edited clips from interviews and documentaries featuring Kiriakou went viral on various social media sites, including Instagram, TikTok, and X, where in these edited clips his voice was sped up or slowed down for dramatic or comedic effect, drawing millions of views. One particularly popular clip was a snippet of an interview where Kiriakou described a night-time airstrike involving 47 cruise missiles that accidentally killed a janitor at Iraqi intelligence service headquarters.

In September 2026, Kiriakou expressed ambition for political office during a question-and-answer session for his recently launched podcast John Kiriakou's Briefing Room: "I only wish that this... newfound success had happened two years ago... I would 100% be running against John Fetterman in the Democratic Primary."

=== Rudy Giuliani pardon scandal ===
In July 2018, Kiriakou signed a $50,000 agreement with Karen Giorno, a former campaign advisor to Donald Trump, as payment for lobbying for a pardon, with the promise of an additional $50,000 as a bonus if it was granted. In 2020, Kiriakou met with Rudy Giuliani, to lobby for a pardon. At the meeting, an associate of Giuliani suggested that they could help Kiriakou for the price of $2 million, which Kiriakou refused. Kiriakou later told The New York Times about the meetings, with both Giorno and Giuliani disputing Kiriakou's account. Giuliani has since been accused by a former aide of selling pardons for money.

=== Veteran Intelligence Professionals for Sanity ===
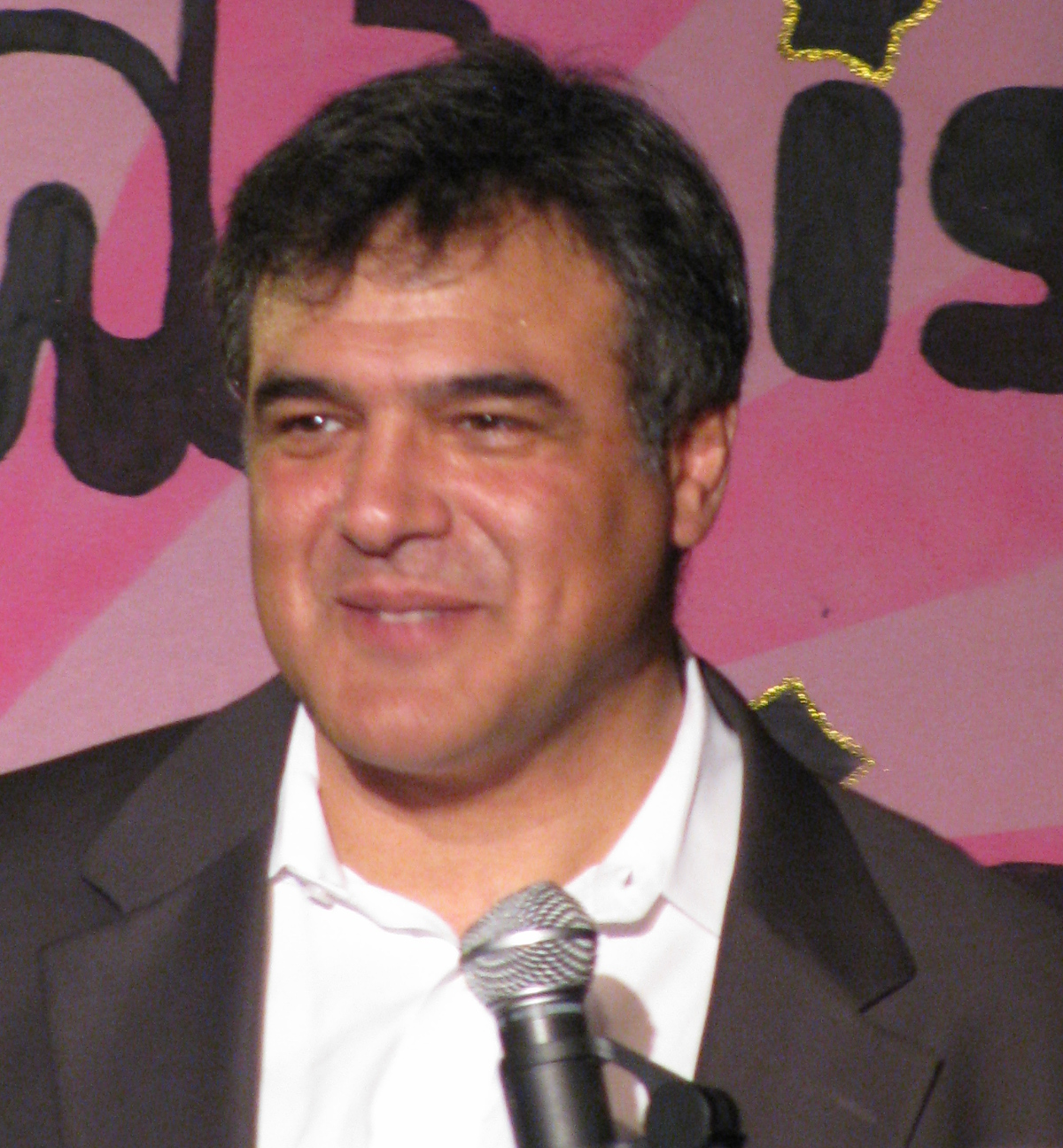
Kiriakou in May 2015

Kiriakou is a founding member of the organization Veteran Intelligence Professionals for Sanity (VIPS). In September 2015, Kiriakou and 27 other members of VIPS' steering committee wrote a letter to President Barack Obama challenging a recently published book that claimed to rebut the report of the Senate Intelligence Committee on the CIA's use of torture.

=== Related media works ===
In 2014, Silenced, a documentary by James Spione on American whistleblowers was released, featuring Kiriakou alongside National Security Agency whistleblower Thomas Andrews Drake and whistleblower attorney Jesselyn Radack. The documentary was later nominated for an Emmy Award in 2016 and has received several awards from film festivals.

=== Modeling career ===
On September 13, 2026, Kiriakou made his modeling debut at Elena Velez's Spring 2027 New York Fashion Week show. Velez is known for her anti-establishment, provocateur style, and for inviting controversial and culturally relevant figures to walk in her shows. During the show, Kiriakou wore two outfits. First was a monochrome, black set with slim black sneakers, a black structured pant, and a black ribbed leather jacket, fit with black leather gloves and a pair of oversized sunglasses. His second look featured a similar black pant and gloves, with a sandy, distressed button-up overshirt, matching neck warmer, and solid black cap while carrying a book about the Watergate scandal tucked under his arm.

== Views and activism ==
=== Torture ===
In 2017, Kiriakou accused Gina Haspel, a CIA officer nominated by Trump to the post of CIA director, of overseeing the waterboarding of suspected al-Qaeda leader Abu Zubaydah at a CIA black site in Thailand. ProPublica published an article based on Kiriakou's accusations, but later retracted it, noting that Haspel was not in charge of the base when Zubaydah was interrogated.

In a 2018 op-ed for The Washington Post, Kiriakou again criticized Haspel, writing: "While I went to prison for disclosing the torture program, Haspel is about to get a promotion despite her connection to it." Kiriakou said the time he spent in prison was "worth every day" because revelations about the CIA's use of torture led to Congress's enactment of a specific ban on waterboarding and other techniques used at the black sites.

=== Jeffrey Epstein ===
In July 2025, Kiriakou stated on Patrick Bet-David's podcast that he believed Jeffrey Epstein had been a Mossad "access agent" used to gain proximity to influential individuals and obtain sensitive information. Kiriakou described Epstein as a "textbook case" of such an operative. His allegations received media attention. No publicly available evidence confirms the allegations.

== Select publications ==
- Kiriakou, John (May 9, 2014). The Reluctant Spy: My Secret Life in the CIA's War on Terror. Skyhorse Publishing. ISBN 978-1-4001-9598-5.
- The Convenient Terrorist: Abu Zubaydah and the Weird Wonderland of America's Secret Wars (Skyhorse, 2017)
- Doing Time Like a Spy: How the CIA Taught Me to Survive and Thrive in Prison (Rare Bird Books, 2017)
- The CIA Insider's Guide to the Iran Crisis (Simon & Schuster, 2020)
- Kiriakou, John (July 24, 2025), "'Why We All Have to Fight': An Insider Speaks Out on the Crimes of the CIA", in Munro, Iain; Kenny, Kate; Fotaki, Marianna (eds.), Perspectives on Whistleblowing, Bristol University Press, pp. 33–46, doi:10.51952/9781529216943.ch003, ISBN 978-1-5292-1694-3
- Arrigo, Jean Maria; Rockwood, Lawrence P.; O'Brien, Jack; Franz, Dutch; DeBatto, David; Kiriakou, John (December 1, 2022). "A military/intelligence operational perspective on the American Psychological Association's weaponization of psychology post-9/11". History of the Human Sciences. 35 (5): 51–79. doi:10.1177/09526951221121711. ISSN 0952-6951.

== Awards ==
The CIA awarded Kiriakou with 10 Exceptional Performance Awards, a Sustained Superior performance Award, the Counterterrorism Service Medal, and the State Department's Meritorious Honor Award. Kiriakou won the 2012 Joe A. Callaway Award for Civic Courage, which is awarded to "national security whistleblowers who stood up for constitutional rights and US values, at great risk to their personal and professional lives". In 2016, he was awarded the Sam Adams Award. Also in 2016, he was given the prestigious PEN First Amendment Award by the PEN Center USA. In 2025, he was awarded the Gold Medal of the College Historical Society of Trinity College, Dublin.

== See also ==
- Plame affair, a political scandal that revolved around the leaking of a CIA officer's name (Valerie Plame)
