= Interrogation of Abu Zubaydah =

Interrogation of a Saudi Arabian in U.S. custody

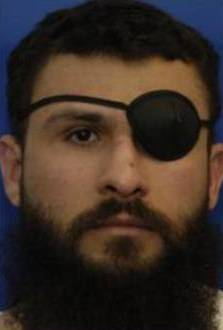
Zubaydah, whose left eye was surgically removed while in US CIA custody

Abu Zubaydah (Zayn al-Abidin Muhammed Hussein Abu Zubaydah) is a Saudi citizen who helped manage the Khalden training camp in Afghanistan. Captured in Pakistan on March 28, 2002, he has since been held by the United States as an enemy combatant. Beginning in August 2002, Abu Zubaydah was the first prisoner to undergo enhanced interrogation techniques. (torture) There is disagreement among government sources as to how effective these techniques were; some officials contend that Abu Zubaydah gave his most valuable information before they were used; CIA lawyer John Rizzo said he gave more material afterward.

The American intelligence community asserts Khalden was a camp for training al Qaeda recruits in the 1990s, but detainees and other sources have disputed this conclusion. Abu Zubaydah was sent to a black site in Thailand, where he was interrogated first by F.B.I. agents using traditional interrogation techniques and then by CIA employees and contractors, who in August 2002, were authorized to use so-called "enhanced interrogation techniques", as termed by the Bush administration. Since 2006, Abu Zubaydah has been held at the Guantanamo Bay detention camp. While in CIA custody, Zubaydah’s previously damaged left eye was surgically removed.

Although President George W. Bush claimed in 2006 three examples of intelligence derived from the torture of Abu Zubaydah by the CIA, which he said showed that it was justified, later reporting has established that the prisoner gave two of the names under conventional interrogation by the FBI, and intelligence analysts already had leads from other sources to the third person.

== Initial interrogation efforts ==
The plans originally called for a joint FBI and CIA interrogation of Abu Zubaydah. However, two FBI agents, Ali Soufan and Steve Gaudin, arrived first at the black site in Thailand where Abu Zubaydah was being held. Their interrogation started with standard interview techniques and also included cleaning and dressing Abu Zubaydah's wounds. Ali Soufan stated that "[w]e kept him alive. It wasn't easy, he couldn't drink, he had a fever. I was holding ice to his lips." The agents attempted to convince Abu Zubaydah that they knew of his activities in languages he understood: English and Arabic. Both agents believed they were making good progress in gathering intelligence from Abu Zubaydah.

During these sessions, Abu Zubaydah revealed that Khalid Sheikh Mohammed, known as "Mukhtar" to Abu Zubaydah, was the mastermind of the 9/11 attacks and that American José Padilla had wanted to use a "dirty bomb" in a terror attack.

When the CIA interrogation team arrived a week or two later than the FBI team, they concluded that Abu Zubaydah was holding back information and that harsher techniques were necessary. The CIA team was led by CIA contractor and former Air Force psychologist James Elmer Mitchell. Mitchell ordered that Abu Zubaydah answer questions or face a gradual increase in aggressive techniques.

In 2009, Soufan testified before Congress that his FBI team was removed from Abu Zubaydah's interrogation multiple times, only to be asked to return when the harsher interrogation tactics of the CIA proved unsuccessful. Ali Soufan was alarmed by the early CIA tactics, such as enforced nudity, cold temperatures, and blaring loud rock music in Zubaydah's cell. Soufan reported to his FBI superiors that the CIA's interrogation constituted "borderline torture." He was particularly concerned about a coffin-like box he discovered that had been built by the CIA interrogation team. He was so angry that he called the FBI assistant director for counterterrorism, Pasquale D'Amaro, and shouted, "I swear to God, I'm going to arrest these guys!" Afterward, both FBI agents were ordered to leave the facility by FBI Director Robert Mueller. Ali Soufan left, but Steve Gaudin stayed an additional few weeks and continued to participate in the interrogation.

=== Efficacy of traditional interrogation techniques ===
Ali Soufan states that traditional, rapport-building interrogation methods worked on Abu Zubaydah. Therefore, according to Soufan, harsher interrogation tactics were unnecessary to obtain actionable intelligence. He alleges that the claim Abu Zubaydah only revealed actionable intelligence after the harsher interrogation techniques were applied is incorrect. "I was in the middle of this, and it's not true that these [aggressive] techniques were effective," Soufan said in a Newsweek interview. "We were able to get the information about Khalid Sheikh Mohammed in a couple of days. We didn't have to do any of this [torture]. We could have done this the right way."

Other intelligence officials also have disputed the need for harsher interrogation techniques. Rohan Gunaratna, an al-Qaeda expert and a government witness in the José Padilla case, said that "most of the information that was exceptionally useful to the fight against al-Qaeda came from Abu Zubaydah, and it came before the U.S. government decided to use enhanced techniques." In addition, Dan Coleman, a retired FBI official and al-Qaeda expert, commented that after the CIA's use of coercive methods, "I don't have confidence in anything he says, because once you go down that road, everything you say is tainted. He was talking before they did that to him, but they didn't believe him. The problem is they didn't realize he didn't know all that much."

Ali Soufan wrote in a New York Times opinion piece about his experience interrogating Abu Zubaydah:

Along with another F.B.I. agent, and with several C.I.A. officers present, I questioned him from March to June 2002, before the harsh techniques were introduced later in August. Under traditional interrogation methods, he provided us with important actionable intelligence. We discovered, for example, that Khalid Shaikh Mohammed was the mastermind of the 9/11 attacks. Abu Zubaydah also told us about Jose Padilla, the so-called dirty bomber. This experience fit what I had found throughout my counterterrorism career: traditional interrogation techniques are successful in identifying operatives, uncovering plots and saving lives. ... Defenders of these techniques have claimed that they got Abu Zubaydah to give up information leading to the capture of Ramzi bin al-Shibh, a top aide to Khalid Shaikh Mohammed, and Mr. Padilla. This is false. The information that led to Mr. Shibh's capture came primarily from a different terrorist operative who was interviewed using traditional methods. As for Mr. Padilla, the dates just don't add up: the harsh techniques were approved in the memo of August 2002, Mr. Padilla had been arrested that May.

== Enhanced interrogation techniques ==
The CIA interrogation strategies were based on work done by James Elmer Mitchell and Bruce Jessen in the Air Force's Survival, Evasion, Resistance and Escape (SERE) program. The CIA contracted with the two psychologists to develop alternative, harsher interrogation techniques than those allowed at the time. Neither of the two psychologists had any experience in conducting interrogations.

The SERE program was originally designed as defensive in nature and was used to train American pilots and other soldiers how to resist harsh interrogation techniques and torture if they fell into enemy hands. The program subjected U.S. military trainees to techniques such as "waterboarding ... sleep deprivation, isolation, exposure to extreme temperatures, enclosure in tiny spaces, bombardment with agonizing sounds at extremely damaging decibel levels, and religious and sexual humiliation." For the CIA, Mitchell and Jessen adapted SERE into an offensive program designed to train CIA agents and contractors on how to use the harsh interrogation techniques or torture to get information from prisoners. All of the tactics listed above were later reported by the International Committee of the Red Cross as having been used on Abu Zubaydah.

Mitchell and Jessen relied heavily on experiments done by the American psychologist Martin Seligman in the 1970s known as "learned helplessness." In these experiments, caged dogs were shocked with electricity in a random way in order to completely break their will to resist. Mitchell believed that Zubaydah must be treated "like a dog in a cage." He said the interrogation "was like an experiment, when you apply electric shocks to a caged dog, after a while, he's so diminished, he can't resist."

According to a report in 2008 by the New York Times, information was not gotten during the torture. Rather, a period of a day or more passed before a non-coercive, trust-building interrogation was started by someone who did not use the harsh methods. CIA employee Deuce Martinez was this interrogator for Zubaydah.

Once Abu Zubaydah was transferred to the Guantanamo Bay detention camp in 2006, he refused to cooperate with FBI interrogators, who were attempting to build cases against the "high-value detainees" untainted by allegations of torture.

In 2007, John Kiriakou, a former CIA officer who was part of the team that captured Abu Zubaydah, said in an interview with ABC News that Zubaydah broke after 35 seconds of his first waterboarding session. However, in his book published in 2010, Kiriakou acknowledged he was not present and had no direct knowledge of Abu Zubaydah's CIA interrogations at the Thailand black site.

=== Intelligence from enhanced interrogation techniques ===
During his CIA interrogation, Abu Zubaydah began to offer many names of supposed terrorist and allegations of various al Qaeda plots. However, The Washington Post reported in 2009 that "not a single significant plot was foiled as a result of Abu Zubaida's tortured confessions, according to former senior government officials who closely followed the interrogations." A former intelligence official stated "[w]e spent millions of dollars chasing false alarms." Ron Suskind said, "we tortured an insane man and ran screaming at every word he uttered."

Abu Zubaydah says he lied under interrogation to prevent further torture.

Some of the various false leads he provided are the following:

- Al Qaeda planned to blow up "soft targets" such as apartment buildings, supermarkets, and shopping malls.
- Attacks could occur against the Statue of Liberty and the Brooklyn Bridge.
- There were plots against banks in the Northeastern United States.
- There was going to be a nerve gas attack on a major U.S. subway system sometime around July 4.
- Al Qaeda plotted to detonate a jacket full of explosives on a civilian airliner and that the planners had used their own metal and explosive detectors to figure out how to successfully accomplish the mission.
- Al Qaeda knew how to build and smuggle a dirty bomb into the United States. Abu Zubaydah later retracted this allegation.

== Ali Soufan's Congressional testimony ==
Ali Soufan testified about Abu Zubaydah's interrogation before the U.S. Senate Committee on the Judiciary on May 13, 2009. In his testimony he stated:

The case of the terrorist Abu Zubaydah is a good example of where the success of the Informed Interrogation Approach can be contrasted with the failure of the harsh technique approach. I have to restrict my remarks to what has been unclassified. (I will note that there is documented evidence supporting everything I will tell you today.) Immediately after Abu Zubaydah was captured, a fellow FBI agent and I were flown to meet him at an undisclosed location. We were both very familiar with Abu Zubaydah and have successfully interrogated al-Qaeda terrorists. We started interrogating him, supported by CIA officials who were stationed at the location, and within the first hour of the interrogation, using the Informed Interrogation Approach, we gained important actionable intelligence. The information was so important that, as I later learned from open sources, it went to CIA Director George Tennet who was so impressed that he initially ordered us to be congratulated. That was apparently quickly withdrawn as soon as Mr. Tennet was told that it was FBI agents, who were responsible. He then immediately ordered a CIA CTC interrogation team to leave DC and head to the location to take over from us. During his capture Abu Zubaydah had been injured. After seeing the extent of his injuries, the CIA medical team supporting us decided they were not equipped to treat him and we had to take him to a hospital or he would die. At the hospital, we continued our questioning as much as possible, while taking into account his medical condition and the need to know all information he might have on existing threats. We were once again very successful and elicited information regarding the role of KSM as the mastermind of the 9/11 attacks, and lots of other information that remains classified. (It is important to remember that before this we had no idea of KSM's role in 9/11 or his importance in the al Qaeda leadership structure.) All this happened before the CTC team arrived. A few days after we started questioning Abu Zubaydah, the CTC interrogation team finally arrived from DC with a contractor who was instructing them on how they should conduct the interrogations, and we were removed. Immediately, on the instructions of the contractor, harsh techniques were introduced, starting with nudity. (The harsher techniques mentioned in the memos were not introduced or even discussed at this point.) The new techniques did not produce results as Abu Zubaydah shut down and stopped talking. At that time nudity and low-level sleep deprivation (between 24 and 48 hours) was being used. After a few days of getting no information, and after repeated inquiries from DC asking why all of sudden no information was being transmitted (when before there had been a steady stream), we again were given control of the interrogation. We then returned to using the Informed Interrogation Approach. Within a few hours, Abu Zubaydah again started talking and gave us important actionable intelligence. This included the details of Jose Padilla, the so-called "dirty bomber." To remind you of how important this information was viewed at the time, the then-Attorney General, John Ashcroft, held a press conference from Moscow to discuss the news. Other important actionable intelligence was also gained that remains classified.

== Interrogation videotapes ==
Soon after the time of Abu Zubaydah's capture in March 2002, the CIA began videotaping him at all times. Hundreds of hours of video on 92 tapes were eventually produced. The CIA stopped taping in late 2002, after Abu Zubaydah had been waterboarded. Originally the CIA claimed it taped the interrogations to protect agents from a wrongful death suit if Abu Zubaydah happened to succumb to the injuries he suffered during his capture.

The tapes were destroyed on November 9, 2005. When this became public in 2007, the CIA Director at that time, Michael Hayden, asserted that the continued existence of the tapes had represented a risk to the CIA personnel involved. He asserted that if the tapes had been leaked, they might cause the CIA personnel to be identified and targeted for retaliation.

== Torture drawings ==
In December 2019, The New York Times published an article in partnership with the Pulitzer Center on Crisis Reporting which was based upon drawings made by Zubaydah, showing how he was tortured in "vivid and disturbing ways". The article includes some of the drawings as well as a link to a 61-page report, as well as asserts that Zubaydah was never a member of Al Qaeda. In the article Zubaydah gives gruesome details of numerous types of torture including being locked up inside a small box called "the dog box" for "countless hours," which caused muscle contractions. "The very strong pain," he said, "made me scream unconsciously."

== See also ==
- The Report (2019 film)
