= Larry C. James =

American psychologist, author and former army officer

Larry C. James is an American psychologist, author and former officer in the United States Army. He served as Joint Task Force Guantanamo's chief psychologist in 2003, and as Abu Ghraib's chief psychologist in 2004.

== Military career ==
	Walter Reed	Served as the Chief of the Department of Psychology for five years.
2001	The Pentagon	Chief Psychologist for the Mental Health Task Force
2003	Joint Task Force Guantanamo	Chief Psychologist, Joint Intelligence Group
2004	Abu Ghraib	Director, Behavioral Science Unit, Joint Interrogation and Debriefing Center at Abu Ghraib

== Post-military career ==
James has also served on the Presidential Task Force on Military Deployment Services for Youth, Families and Service Members.

In 2008, James was hired as the Dean of Wright State University's School of Professional Psychology.

In 2008 he published a memoir, entitled: "Fixing Hell: An Army Psychologist Confronts Abu Ghraib". A review in the Brooklyn Rail described the book as James's defense against insinuations he was a "torture shrink", and noted:

James admits that in 2002, the year before his tenure at Guantanamo, a team of CIA psychologists came to Cuba to train soldiers in harsh interrogation methods. But by James' account, the whole point of his mission at Guantanamo, and then at Abu Ghraib, was to reverse the culture of abuse that resulted.

Trudy Bond, another psychologist, requested in 2008 that the Louisiana State Board of Examiners of Psychologists review the ethics of James' work in Guantanamo. When the board dismissed Bond's complaint she requested the Board's actions be reviewed by the state court. State District Judge Mike Caldwell ruled he did not have jurisdiction over the Board.

In July 2010, Deborah Popowski, Terry Lodge and Tyler Giannini filed a challenge to James's right to practice psychology with the Ohio Board of Psychology. In June 2013, the Ohio state court dismissed the case on procedural grounds and ruled that Ohio's psychology licensing board did not have a legal obligation to conduct an investigation into Dr. James.

== See also ==
- John Leso
- James Elmer Mitchell
- Behavioral Science Consultation Team
