= U.S. Senate report on CIA torture =

Report of the United States government

The U.S. Senate Report on CIA Detention Interrogation Program that details the use of torture during CIA detention and interrogation.

The Committee Study of the Central Intelligence Agency's Detention and Interrogation Program is a report compiled by the bipartisan United States Senate Select Committee on Intelligence (SSCI) about the Central Intelligence Agency (CIA)'s Detention and Interrogation Program and its use of torture during interrogation on detainees in CIA custody. The report covers CIA activities before, during, and after the "war on terror". The initial report was approved on December 13, 2012, by a vote of 9–6, with seven Democrats, one independent, and one Republican voting in favor of the report and six Republicans voting in opposition.

The more than 6,700-page report (including 38,000 footnotes) details the history of the CIA's Detention and Interrogation Program and the Committee's 20 findings and conclusions. On December 9, 2014, the SSCI released a 525-page portion that consisted of key findings and an executive summary of the full report. It took more than five years to complete. The full unredacted report remains classified.

The report details actions by CIA officials including torturing prisoners, providing misleading or false information about classified CIA programs to the president, Department of Justice, Congress, and the media, impeding government oversight and internal criticism, and mismanaging the program. It also revealed the existence of previously unknown detainees, that more detainees were subjected to "enhanced interrogation techniques" (widely understood to be a euphemism for torture) than was previously disclosed, and that more techniques were used without Department of Justice approval. It concluded that the use of enhanced interrogation techniques did not yield unique intelligence that saved lives (as the CIA claimed), nor was it useful in gaining cooperation from detainees, and that the program damaged the United States' international standing.

Some people, including some CIA officials and U.S. Republicans, disputed the report's conclusions and said it provided an incomplete picture of the program. Others criticized the publishing of the report, citing its potential for damage to the U.S. and the contentious history of its development. Former Republican presidential nominee John McCain praised the release of the report. Upon the report's release, then-president Barack Obama stated, "One of the strengths that makes America exceptional is our willingness to openly confront our past, face our imperfections, make changes and do better."

In the wake of the release of the report's executive summary, a large number of individuals and organizations called for the prosecution of the CIA and government officials who perpetrated, approved, or provided legal cover for the torture of detainees; however, prosecutions are considered unlikely. The U.S. has also passed legislation, sponsored by Senators McCain and Dianne Feinstein, to prevent U.S. agencies from using many of the torture techniques described in the report.

The 2019 film The Report covers the decade-long time period that led to the final creation and publication of the report.

== History ==
=== Impetus for the report ===
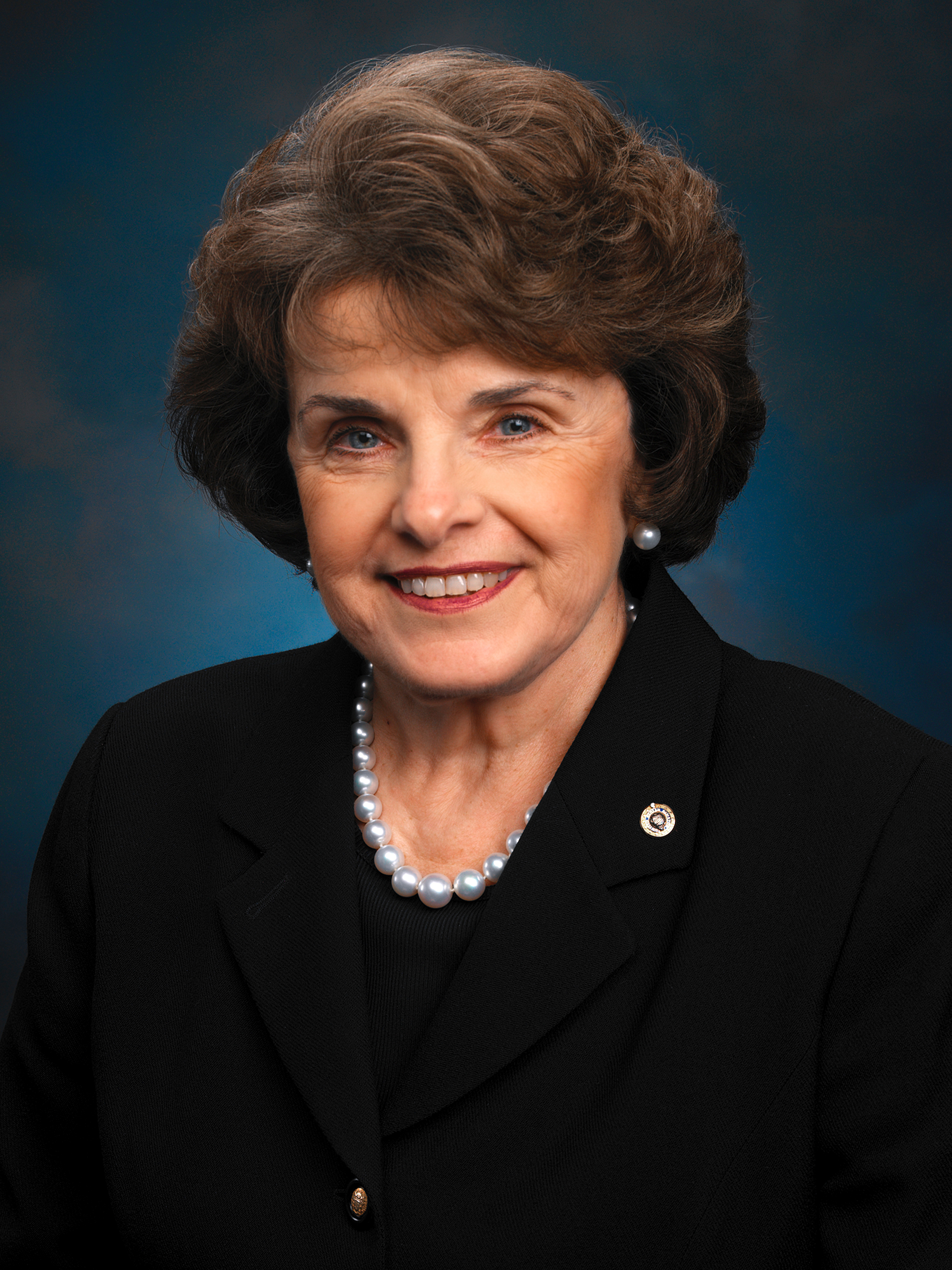
Senator Dianne Feinstein (D-CA) was the chair of the Senate Select Committee on Intelligence from 2009 to early 2015

California Senator Dianne Feinstein said that the initial investigation began after press reports emerged stating that in 2005, CIA Director of the National Clandestine Service Jose Rodriguez destroyed almost 100 video recordings of interrogations over objections from CIA and White House legal staff. The tapes showed CIA officers and contractors using torture techniques such as waterboarding on detainees Abu Zubaydah and Abd al-Rahim al-Nashiri. The CIA did not inform the United States Senate Select Committee on Intelligence (SSCI) that Rodriguez had destroyed the tapes, and the committee had not known they had existed. SSCI believed that Rodriguez was covering up illegal activities by the CIA, although the committee had initially been told by CIA officials that Rodriguez was not engaging in "destruction of evidence". Rodriguez preemptively criticized the report in an op-ed for The Washington Post on December 5, 2014. In addition to destroying the torture tapes, the Committee's report shows that Rodriguez was heavily involved in the CIA's use of torture, including overseeing black sites where torture took place, preventing CIA Counterterrorism Center (CTC) legal staff from implementing vetting processes for interrogators, provided misleading information to the Department of Defense about a detainee's identity, and participated in the payment of millions of dollars to a country hosting a black site.

CIA Director Michael Hayden told the Committee on December 11, 2007, that if the Committee had asked for the videos, the CIA would have provided them, and offered the Committee written summaries of the interrogation sessions depicted on the destroyed tapes. CIA records show that the decision to destroy the tapes came shortly after CIA attorneys raised concerns about Congress discovering the tapes' existence.

Jane Mayer's book The Dark Side stated that the CIA also neglected to inform the 9/11 Commission that these tapes existed: "In a meeting on December 23, 2003, [Commission executive director Philip D.] Zelikow demanded that the CIA at the very least provide any and all documents responsive to its requests, even if the Commission had not specifically asked for them. [CIA Director George] Tenet replied by alluding to several documents he thought would be helpful. But in an omission that would later become part of a criminal investigation, neither Tenet nor anyone else from the CIA in the meeting mentioned that, in fact, the Agency had in its possession at that point hundreds of hours of videotapes of the interrogations of Abu Zubayda and Abd al-Rahim al-Nashiri, both of whom were waterboarded."

In December 2007, the committee opened an investigation into the tape destruction and designated four staffers to conduct the investigation, which they completed around early 2009.

=== Development of the report ===
On February 11, 2009, the committee began considering a broader review of the CIA's detention and interrogation practices after committee staff presented a summary of the operational cables detailing the interrogations of Abu Zubaydah and Abd al-Rahim al-Nashiri. On March 5, 2009, the Senate Intelligence Committee voted 14–1 to open an investigation into the CIA detention and interrogation program. In August 2009, Attorney General Eric Holder announced a parallel preliminary criminal investigation into the use of unauthorized interrogation techniques by CIA officials. As a result of the attorney general's investigation, the Republican minority on the SSCI concluded that many witnesses were unlikely to participate in the investigation for fear of criminal liability. Citing the attorney general investigation as their reason, the Republican minority of the SSCI withdrew their participation from the investigation in September 2009.

The Senate investigation was led by Committee staffer and former FBI investigator Daniel J. Jones, and was prepared following a review of more than 6.3 million pages of documents, cables, emails, and other materials principally provided by the CIA. The document production phase lasted more than three years and was completed in July 2012. As described in the Senate report, an additional 9,400 classified documents repeatedly requested by the SSCI were withheld by the White House under a claim of executive privilege.

Despite the initial expectation that interviews would be used, no formal interviews or hearings were conducted in the preparation of the report. The lack of interviews and hearings was one of the chief complaints of the Republican minority on SSCI. However, the report included CIA officials' on-the-record statements in classified committee hearings, written statements, and interviews conducted through the CIA Inspector General's office and the Agency's oral history program, as well as through the formal response to the committee in June 2013 after reading the report. These statements and interviews included those from CIA director George Tenet, CTC director Jose Rodriguez, CIA general counsel Scott Muller, CIA deputy director of operations James Pavitt, CIA acting general counsel John Rizzo, CIA deputy director John McLaughlin, and a variety of interrogators, lawyers, medical personnel, senior counterterrorism analysts and managers of the detention and interrogation program.

The CIA estimated that approximately $40 million in personnel time and resources was spent assisting the investigation, but this was largely because of the CIA's insistence on hiring Centra Technology contractors to review documents prior to presenting them to the Committee and establishing a separate secure facility and computer network for CIA and Committee staff to use during the review. This deviated from the standard document-sharing process, in which the CIA provides documents for Committee staff to review in Committee offices.

The final report was approved on December 13, 2012, by a vote of 9–6, with eight Democrats and one Republican (Olympia Snowe) voting in favor of publication and six Republicans voting in opposition, and the published minority views of Senator Chambliss were joined by Senators Burr, Risch, Coats, Rubio, and Coburn. Republican Senator John McCain, a member of the Committee ex officio, did not have a vote, but he supported approval alongside Snowe. On April 3, 2014, the SSCI voted 11–3 to submit a revised version of the executive summary, findings, and recommendations of the report for declassification analysis in preparation for future public release. Independent Senator Angus King and Republican Senator Susan Collins supported the release of the report. After eight months, involving contentious negotiations about what details should remain classified, the revised executive summary, findings, and recommendations were made public with many redactions on December 9, 2014.

The CIA had demanded that the Committee redact the names of all detainees, all CIA officer's pseudonyms, and the names of all countries that hosted black sites. Daniel J. Jones told The Guardian that the Agency wanted to redact other material, such as references to Allah. The CIA wanted pseudonyms to be used for contractors and interrogators James Mitchell and Bruce Jessen, despite the fact that they had both been identified publicly prior to the report's release. The report ended up including detainee names, and used pseudonyms (such as "CIA OFFICER 1") for several Agency officers, but redacted the names of almost all others, as well as black site host countries.

Information about the cooperation of foreign agencies with the CIA has been redacted from the report. The British chairman of the Intelligence and Security Committee stated they would request access to anything taken out of the report at the request of British agencies.

==== Panetta Review and CIA hacking incident ====
On December 17, 2013, Sen. Mark Udall (D-CO) revealed the existence of a secret internal review (the "Panetta Review") conducted by the CIA that was consistent with the Senate's report but conflicted with the CIA's official response to the report. In January 2014, CIA officials claimed that the Intelligence Committee had accessed portions of the "Panetta Review" and removed them from CIA facilities in 2010 without CIA authorization. In March 2014, Sen. Dianne Feinstein (D-CA), chairwoman of the Intelligence Committee, confirmed that a portion of the "Panetta Review" had been copied and transferred to a safe in the Senate's Hart Office Building. She stated that the action was necessary to protect the documents from the CIA, which had destroyed videotapes depicting brutal interrogation methods in 2005.

During the review process the CIA had removed hundreds of pages of documents from the Committee staff's CIA-provided computer network (called "RDINet" for "rendition, detention, and interrogation") without informing Committee staff. According to Senator Feinstein, when Committee staff inquired about the missing documents, CIA staff initially denied the files had been removed, then blamed IT contractors, and finally falsely claimed that the White House had requested their removal.

When negotiating the review process, the Committee and the CIA came to an agreement that the CIA would establish "a walled-off network share-drive" accessible only to Committee staff, and that "CIA access to the walled off network shared drive will be limited to CIA information technology staff, except as authorized by the committee or its staff."

During an "extraordinary" 45-minute speech on March 11, 2014, Feinstein said the CIA unlawfully searched the Intelligence Committee's computers to determine how the committee staff obtained the "Panetta Review" documents. Feinstein also said that the CIA's acting general counsel, later identified as Robert Eatinger, requested the FBI conduct a criminal inquiry into the committee staff who had accessed and relocated the "Panetta Review" documents. She said she believed that the request was "a potential effort to intimidate [Intelligence Committee] staff." Eatinger had been involved in the destruction of video tapes in 2005 (which started the Senate investigation), and Feinstein added that Eatinger was mentioned by name over 1,600 times in the Committee's full report. The same day that Feinstein made the allegations, CIA director John O. Brennan denied that the CIA searched the Senate computers, stating, "As far as the allegations of, you know, CIA hacking into, you know, Senate computers, nothing could be further from the truth. I mean we wouldn't do that. I mean that's just beyond the – you know, the scope of reason in terms of what we would do... When the facts come out on this, I think a lot of people who are claiming that there has been this tremendous sort of spying and monitoring and hacking will be proved wrong."

On July 31, 2014, the CIA's Inspector General confirmed that the CIA had improperly gained access to and searched the Senate Intelligence Committee's computer network, including that CIA employees had accessed the Committee's computers, read Committee staff's email, and sent a criminal referral to the Department of Justice based on false information. A Justice Department spokesman later announced that they would not be pursuing charges in the hacking incident. An internal review panel appointed by Brennan contended that the searches "were lawful and in some cases done at the behest of John O. Brennan, the C.I.A. director."

== Findings ==
=== Terse summary of findings ===
The mostly declassified 524-page Executive Summary began with a 6-page Forward by Dianne Feinstein, Chairman, Senate Select Committee on Intelligence. This Forward includes the following:

[P]rior to the attacks of September 2001, the CIA determined from its own experience with coercive interrogations, that such techniques "do not produce intelligence," "will probably result in false answers," and had historically proven to be ineffective. Yet these conclusions were ignored. We cannot again allow history to be forgotten and grievous past mistakes to be repeated.

=== 20 Findings listed in the report ===
The more-than 6,700-page report produced 20 key findings. They are, verbatim from the unclassified Executive Summary report:

1. The CIA's use of its enhanced interrogation techniques was not an effective means of acquiring intelligence or gaining cooperation from detainees.
2. The CIA's justification for the use of its enhanced interrogation techniques rested on inaccurate claims of their effectiveness.
3. The interrogations of CIA detainees were brutal and far worse than the CIA represented to policymakers and others.
4. The conditions of confinement for CIA detainees were harsher than the CIA had represented to policymakers and others.
5. The CIA repeatedly provided inaccurate information to the Department of Justice (DOJ), impeding a proper legal analysis of the CIA's Detention and Interrogation Program.
6. The CIA has actively avoided or impeded congressional oversight of the program.
7. The CIA impeded effective White House oversight and decision-making.
8. The CIA's operation and management of the program complicated, and in some cases impeded, the national security missions of other Executive Branch agencies.
9. The CIA impeded oversight by the CIA's Office of Inspector General.
10. The CIA coordinated the release of classified information to the media, including inaccurate information concerning the effectiveness of the CIA's enhanced interrogation techniques.
11. The CIA was unprepared as it began operating its Detention and Interrogation Program more than six months after being granted detention authorities.
12. The CIA's management and operation of its Detention and Interrogation Program was deeply flawed throughout the program's duration, particularly so in 2002 and early 2003.
13. Two contract psychologists devised the CIA's enhanced interrogation techniques and played a central role in the operation, assessments, and management of the CIA's Detention and Interrogation Program. By 2005, the CIA had overwhelmingly outsourced operations related to the program.
14. CIA detainees were subjected to coercive interrogation techniques that had not been approved by the Department of Justice or had not been authorized by CIA Headquarters.
15. The CIA did not conduct a comprehensive or accurate accounting of the number of individuals it detained, and held individuals who did not meet the legal standard for detention. The CIA's claims about the number of detainees held and subjected to its enhanced interrogation techniques were inaccurate.
16. The CIA failed to adequately evaluate the effectiveness of its enhanced interrogation techniques.
17. The CIA rarely reprimanded or held personnel accountable for serious or significant violations, inappropriate activities, and systematic and individual management failures.
18. The CIA marginalized and ignored numerous internal critiques, criticisms, and objections concerning the operation and management of the CIA's Detention and Interrogation Program.
19. The CIA's Detention and Interrogation Program was inherently unsustainable and had effectively ended by 2006 due to unauthorized press disclosures, reduced cooperation from other nations, and legal and oversight concerns.
20. The CIA's Detention and Interrogation Program damaged the United States' standing in the world, and resulted in other significant monetary and non-monetary costs.

=== Findings as reported by media outlets ===
==== Examples of torture and abuse of prisoners ====
- The CIA had force-fed some prisoners orally and/or anally in order to establish "total control over the detainee." The report notes that CIA documents indicate "Chief of Interrogations [redacted] also ordered the rectal rehydration of KSM without a determination of medical need, a procedure that the chief of interrogations would later characterize as illustrative of the interrogator’s 'total control over the detainee.'"
- The Committee found that "[a]t least five CIA detainees were subjected to 'rectal rehydration' or rectal feeding without documented medical necessity." These detainees are listed as Abu Zubaydah, Khalid Shaykh Mohammad, Majid Khan, and Marwan al-Jabbur.
- At least one prisoner was "diagnosed with chronic hemorrhoids, an anal fissure and symptomatic rectal prolapse," symptoms normally associated with a violent rape. The report identified this detainee as Mustafa al-Hawsawi.
- CIA officials, including general counsel Scott Miller and deputy director of operations James Pavitt, were told that rectal exams of at least two prisoners had been conducted with "excessive force." A CIA attorney was asked to follow up on these incidents, but the report states that "CIA records do not indicate any resolution of the inquiry."
- CIA interrogators threatened to rape and murder children and/or family members of prisoners. For example, according to the CIA's Inspector General, a CIA interrogator told Abd al-Rahim al-Nashiri that if he did not provide information, "We could get your mother in here," and "We can bring your family in here." The interrogator also led al-Nashiri to believe that he was being held in a Middle Eastern country whose interrogators sexually abused female family members in front of detainees.
- In November 2002 the CIA killed Gul Rahman during interrogation by hypothermia. Rahman was tortured by CIA officers and contractors and left wearing only a sweatshirt, chained to a wall in a seating position on a cold floor. No CIA employees were disciplined as a result of his death, and the CIA officer who managed the black site where Rahman died, who was not a trained interrogator and had a history of behavioral issues, was recommended for a cash award of $2,500 for "consistently superior work" and continued to interrogate detainees.
- At least four prisoners with injuries to their legs (two with broken feet, one with a sprained ankle and one with an amputated leg) were forced to stand on their injuries. Interrogators subjected these detainees to extended periods of standing sleep deprivation without prior headquarters approval.
- Interrogators told prisoners that they would be killed. For example: one prisoner, Abu Zubaydah, was told "We can never let the world know what I have done to you", another was told that the only way he would be allowed to leave the prison would be in a coffin-shaped confinement box.
- One CIA interrogator who was subsequently sent home early threatened prisoner Abd al-Rahim al-Nashiri with a gun and power drill, racking a handgun and revving the drill next to al-Nashiri's hooded head. The interrogator had not sought Headquarters approval for these unauthorized actions.
- At least two prisoners were victims of "mock executions." According to the CIA's Inspector General, the same debriefer who used the gun and drill on al-Nashiri claimed that he had witnessed other CIA interrogators stage an execution to scare a detainee, and several other CIA officers also said that they had witnessed or participated in mock executions.
- Several prisoners almost died and became completely unresponsive or nearly drowned during waterboarding. Multiple CIA communications described CIA interrogators waterboarding Abu Zubaydah and in one session, Zubaydah "becoming completely unresponsive, with bubbles rising through his open, full mouth." He remained unresponsive until given medical attention, when he regained consciousness and expelled "copious amounts of liquid."
- Abu Zubaydah's eye was so badly damaged during his time in prison that it was surgically removed.
- The CIA kept some prisoners awake for over one week (180 hours), as well as shorter extended periods of time. This included the use of sitting or standing stress positions that prevented sleep. Sleep deprivation caused at least five to experience "disturbing" hallucinations. The CIA claimed in its 2013 response that when detainees experienced hallucinations during sleep deprivation, medical staff intervened and allowed the detainee to sleep. However, CIA records indicate that this was not always true.
- After more than a month of torture, including loud music, dietary and temperature manipulation, sleep and sensory deprivation, and shackling, prisoner Ridha al-Najjar was psychologically traumatized to the point of being described as "a broken man."
- Prisoners were forced to use buckets for toilets. As punishment, interrogators could remove the waste bucket from a prisoner's cell. In one case, CIA interrogators told a detainee that he could earn a bucket by cooperating, and those undergoing standing sleep deprivation were routinely put in diapers. This contradicts CIA Director Michael Hayden's assertion that "Detainees have never been denied the means – at a minimum, they've always had a bucket – to dispose of their human waste."
- On visiting one of the CIA black sites, CIA records indicate that Federal Bureau of Prisons representatives stated "they [had] never been in a facility where individuals were so sensory deprived i.e., constant white noise, no talking, everyone in the dark, with the guards wearing a light on their head when they collected and escorted a detainee to an interrogation cell, detainees constantly being shackled to the wall or floor, and the starkness of each cell (concrete and bars). There is nothing like this in the Federal Bureau of Prisons. They then explained that they understood the mission and it was their collective assessment that in spite of all this sensory deprivation, the detainees were not being treated in humanely [sic]." This evaluation was of the same black site where Gul Rahman died after CIA interrogators beat him and left him shackled half nude on a cold floor.
- Janat Gul was tortured for months based on false accusations made by an informant known as Asset Y. According to CIA documents, senior CIA officers had expressed doubt about the source's credibility and Gul denied having information about imminent threats to the United States, but interrogators proceeded to subject Gul to numerous torture techniques. Even after CIA staff at the site stated that they believed Gul was not withholding information, CIA Headquarters ordered continued use of torture tactics. Gul never provided the information the CIA thought he possessed, and Asset Y admitted to fabricating the accusations against him.
- CIA interrogators forced detainee Abu Zubaydah into a box the size of a coffin for a total of 266 hours (over 11 days) and also forced him to stay for 29 hours in a box measuring 21 inches (53 cm) wide, 2.5 feet (76 cm) deep and 2.5 feet (76 cm) high. Interrogators told him that the only way he was leaving the facility was in a coffin-shaped box.
- CIA interrogators used unauthorized forms of torture, or used authorized techniques for more time or in more extreme ways than were approved, and usually faced no disciplinary action. These unauthorized techniques included forcing detainee Abd al-Rahim al-Nashiri to stand with his hands shackled over his head for 2 1/2 days, racking a handgun next to his head and operating a power drill near his body. Other unauthorized techniques and divergence from authorized applications of techniques included improvised stress positions, longer sleep deprivation than approved, punitive water dousing and nudity, temperature, dietary manipulation, application of the waterboard that differed from the approved methods. CIA interrogators also subjected multiple detainees to unauthorized torture techniques that Headquarters later retroactively approved.
- CIA interrogators subjected one detainee, Abu Hudhaifa, to "ice water baths" and 66 hours of standing sleep deprivation, as well as forced nudity and dietary manipulation. He was later released as the CIA had mistaken his identity. According to CIA records, Hudhaifa was one of dozens of individuals whom the CIA detained who were cases of mistaken identity or otherwise did not meet the requirements for detention.
- Torture of prisoners led to serious mental harm (e.g. dementia, paranoia, insomnia, and attempts at self-harm [including suicide])
- Of the 119 known detainees, at least 39 were tortured by the CIA. The report notes that this is likely a conservative estimate. The CIA also used torture on several detainees before evaluating whether they would be willing to cooperate, despite later CIA claims to the Committee that detainees were always provided the opportunity to cooperate before enhanced interrogation techniques. In 2003, CIA interrogators subjected at least six detainees to shackled nudity, sleep deprivation, or other torture techniques before any questioning took place.

==== Misleading information provided by the CIA ====
- The CIA's directors (George Tenet, Porter Goss and Michael Hayden) provided inaccurate and misleading information to members of the U.S. Congress, the White House and the Director of National Intelligence about the program's effectiveness and the number of prisoners that the CIA held. For example, on December 23, 2005, Goss wrote, inaccurately, to National Security advisor Stephen Hadley, Homeland Security advisor Frances Townsend, and Director of National Intelligence John Negroponte that the CIA's interrogation program thwarting an attack on Heathrow Airport "has allowed the U.S. to save hundreds, if not thousands, of lives," and that "only 29 [detainees] have undergone interrogation that used one or more of the 13 enhanced interrogation techniques."
- The CIA provided inaccurate information regarding the interrogation program to members of the media, including journalists Douglas Jehl of the New York Times and Ronald Kessler, as well as Dateline NBC. This information misrepresented the interrogation program's effectiveness and the sources of specific intelligence.
- The CIA provided inaccurate information in official documents to government officials about the value of information extracted from prisoners subjected to torture (e.g. stating that information extracted from Khalid Sheikh Mohammed during torture had allowed for the capture of Riduan Isamuddin, aka Hambali). CIA communications and records revealed that the information that led to Hambali's capture came from signals intelligence, a CIA source, and Thai authorities' investigations, not the use of enhanced interrogation techniques.
- Despite contrary statements made by the CIA's Director, Michael V. Hayden, that "all those involved in the questioning of detainees are carefully chosen and screened for demonstrated professional judgment and maturity," the CIA did employ individuals as interrogators who "had engaged in inappropriate detainee interrogations, had workplace anger management issues, and had reportedly admitted to sexual assault."
- The CIA provided false information to the Department of Justice's Office of Legal Counsel about the methods of interrogation it was using against prisoners.
- CIA Deputy Director of the National Counterterrorism Center, Philip Mudd, discussed outreach to the media to thwart Congress, stating, "We either get out and sell, or we get hammered, which has implications beyond the media. [C]ongress reads it, cuts our authorities, mess up our budget."
- The report found that the CIA held at least 119 detainees during the course of the interrogation program, more than the 98 previously reported to Congress.
- An email cited in the report and prepared by a subordinate indicates that CIA Director Michael Hayden knew that the CIA had detained at least 112 detainees, but told CIA personnel to report 98, the number that had been provided to Congress. A CIA officer stated, "DCIA instructed me to keep the detainee number at 98 – pick whatever date i [sic] needed to make that happen but the number is 98."
- The director of the CIA's Counterterrorism Center testified to the Committee on August 2, 2007 that detainees "are given ample opportunity to provide the information without the use of EITs." This was false, as CIA interrogators subjected numerous detainees to enhanced interrogation techniques before allowing them to provide information through traditional interrogation.
- Several times throughout the program, CIA officers identified inaccuracies in CIA representations to other U.S. government offices and the public about the program's effectiveness. The CIA did not correct these inaccuracies, and allowed inaccurate information to remain as the CIA's official position.

==== Innocent people imprisoned by the CIA ====
At least 26 of the 119 prisoners (22%) held by the CIA were subsequently found by the CIA to have been improperly detained, many having also experienced torture. Under the memorandum of notification (MON) signed by President George W. Bush to establish the CIA detention program, only persons who "pose a continuing, serious threat of violence or death to U.S. persons and interests or planning terrorist activities" were eligible for detention. The MON also did not reference interrogation. Two innocent people were jailed and tortured based solely on allegations from another prisoner who fabricated information after having been tortured himself. Two former intelligence sources were jailed and tortured by accident. One mentally challenged man was held by the CIA in order to persuade family members to provide information. Among the 26 individuals who the CIA acknowledged had been improperly detained, only three were released after less than one month in CIA custody, while most were confined for several months. There is only one example in CIA records of the Agency holding personnel accountable for wrongfully detaining individuals who they themselves determined did not fit MON criteria.

==== Other ====
- The report noted a November 2001 memorandum circulated within the CIA by its attorneys titled "Hostile Interrogations: Legal Considerations for C.I.A. Officers". In it, the lawyers argued that prosecution for torture could be avoided if said torture "resulted in saving thousands of lives."
- Despite CIA assertions that there were no objections to the interrogation program, some CIA personnel found the torture revolting and asked to be transferred from facilities where torture was being conducted. Some also questioned whether such activities could continue and were told that the senior officials in the CIA had approved these techniques.
- The report suggests torture was the source of a false confession by Ibn al-Shaykh al-Libi linking Saddam Hussein and al-Qaeda that was cited in Colin Powell's address to the UN in advance of the 2003 Iraq War.
- The CIA kept incomplete records of their detainees, so it is unclear if 119 is a complete count.
- The report's scope is limited to the abuse of detainees directly in CIA custody and does not include detainees tortured at the behest of the CIA after being extraordinarily rendered.
- In 2008, 85% of the CIA's Rendition, Detention and Interrogation Group consisted of outside contractors.

=== Contractors ===
The two CIA contractors who developed the "enhanced interrogation techniques" (John "Bruce" Jessen and James Mitchell, who are referred to as "Hammond Dunbar" and "Grayson Swigert" in the report, respectively), received US$81 million for their services, out of an original contract worth more than US$180 million. NBC News identified the contractors' company as Mitchell, Jessen & Associates. Mitchell and Jessen were psychologists at the Defense Department who taught special forces how to resist and endure torture in a program called Survival, Evasion, Resistance and Escape (SERE), based on Communist torture techniques. Neither man had specialized knowledge of Al Qaeda, nor were they practised interrogators. "They had never carried out a real interrogation, only mock sessions in the military training they had overseen," The New York Times reported in 2009. "They had no relevant scholarship; their Ph.D. dissertations were on high blood pressure and family therapy. They had no language skills and no expertise on Al Qaeda."

The CIA nevertheless hired them for the interrogation program, for which they reverse-engineered SERE tactics and "developed the list of enhanced interrogation techniques and personally conducted interrogations of some of the CIA's most significant detainees using those techniques. The contractors also evaluated whether the detainees' psychological state allowed for continued use of the techniques, even for some detainees they themselves were interrogating or had interrogated." The two personally waterboarded detainees Abu Zubaydah, Abd al-Rahim al-Nashiri, and Khalid Sheikh Mohammad and swore by the technique's effectiveness, despite having "no direct experience with the waterboard" (as it was not a SERE technique) other than testing it on each other.

The contractors developed a list of 12 forms of torture for use against detainees. The list included: 1) the attention grasp, 2) walling, 3) facial hold, 4) facial slap, 5) cramped confinement, 6) wall standing, 7) stress positions, 8) sleep deprivation, 9) waterboarding, 10) use of diapers, 11) use of insects, and 12) mock burials. John Rizzo, the CIA acting general counsel who met with the contractors, described them as "sadistic and terrifying" in his book Company Man.

During Mitchell and Jessen's time participating in the CIA's interrogation program, CIA personnel lodged a number of complaints against them. These included concerns about the possible conflict of interest of the two administering enhanced interrogation techniques on detainees, then psychologically evaluating the same detainees to determine the success of the interrogations. One internal CIA communication said that "no professional in the field would credit their later judgments as psychologists assessing the subjects of their enhanced measures," and another noted, "Jim and Bob have shown blatant disregard for the ethics shared by almost all of their colleagues."

The CIA's contract with Mitchell and Jessen's company was terminated in 2009, but included a $5 million dollar indemnification agreement that covered the costs associated with any possible criminal prosecution. According to the report and CIA documents obtained by journalist Jason Leopold, Mitchell and Jessen's company billed the CIA $1.1 million for legal services from 2007 to 2012, and the CIA is obligated to pay for their legal expenses until 2021.

In October 2015, the ACLU filed a lawsuit against Mitchell and Jessen on behalf of three detainees who had been tortured in the CIA's interrogation program, including Gul Rahman, who died of hypothermia after CIA interrogators beat him and chained him half naked to the wall of a freezing cell. The suit was settled out of court for an undisclosed amount.

=== Financial aspects ===
According to the report, the Detention and Interrogation Program cost in excess of $300 million in non-personnel costs. This included funding for the CIA to construct and maintain detention facilities, including two facilities costing millions of dollars that were never used, in part due to host country political concerns. "To encourage governments to clandestinely host CIA detention sites, or to increase support for existing sites, the CIA provided millions of dollars in cash payments to foreign government officials."

The intelligence officer Jose Rodriguez was personally involved in at least one of these payments to a foreign government. According to an unnamed CIA official, "In one case, we gave [Redacted] $[Redacted],000,000 ... Myself and Jose [Rodriguez] [Redacted] ... We never counted it. I'm not about to count that kind of money for a receipt."

The report states that in 2006 the value of the CIA's base contract with psychologists James Mitchell and Bruce Jessen's company with all options exercised was in excess of $180 million; "the contractors received $81 million prior to the contract's termination in 2009. In 2007, the CIA provided a multi-year indemnification agreement to protect the company and its employees from legal liability arising out of the program. The CIA has since paid out more than $1 million pursuant to the agreement."

=== CIA internal objections ===
Numerous CIA officials and personnel objected to various aspects of the program. According to journalist Jane Mayer, as the CIA formulated the interrogation regime, several top CIA officers, including R. Scott Shumate (chief operational psychologist for the Counterterrorism Center), left the CIA, reportedly related to disagreements over using the proposed techniques.

During the interrogation of detainee Abd al-Rahim al-Nashiri, the CIA's Chief of Interrogation announced his resignation due to his misgivings about the program, stating that it was a "train wreak [sic] waiting to happen." The same individual drafted a cable for CIA Headquarters that voiced his opinion that al-Nashiri was not withholding information, that continued use of enhanced interrogation techniques "is excessive and may cause him to cease cooperation on any level," and noted that multiple CIA personnel believed that it "may push [al-Nashiri] over the edge psychologically."

Multiple CIA personnel also objected to contractors Mitchell and Jessen both acting as interrogators and psychologically evaluating detainees, as this was a conflict of interest. The CIA's Office of Medical Services noted that the CIA paid Mitchell and Jessen to apply enhanced interrogation techniques, and then "[judge] both [the technique's] effectiveness and detainee resilience, and implicitly [propose] continued use of the technique at a daily compensation reported to be $1,800/day."

Personnel at the black site called "Detention Site GREEN" in the report also raised concerns that enhanced interrogation technique application at the site was "approach[ing] the legal limit." Jose Rodriguez responded to these concerns by stating: "Strongly urge that any speculative language as to the legality of given activities or, more precisely, judgment calls as to their legality vis-a-vis operational guidelines for this activity agreed upon and vetted at the most senior levels of the agency, be refrained from in written traffic (email or cable traffic). Such language is not helpful."

In late 2002 and early 2003 Charlie Wise was the CIA's Director of Interrogation, and, with Mitchell and Jessen, one of the three individuals officially authorized to use Waterboarding. Wise joined the psychologists after they had begun using Waterboarding, and there was a personality clash. Wise said the torture program the psychologists set up was a "train [wreck] waiting to happen", and "I intend to get the hell off the train before it happens." In 2004, when the report summary was released, the Washington Post described his subsequent resignation as voluntary.

== Executive branch response ==
=== Response from Obama administration ===
President Barack Obama said the report had revealed a "troubling program" and that "We will rely on all elements of our national power, including the power and example of our founding ideals. That is why I have consistently supported the declassification of today's report. No nation is perfect. But one of the strengths that makes America exceptional is our willingness to openly confront our past, face our imperfections, make changes and do better." The Obama administration consistently worked through White House Chief of Staff Denis McDonough. According to press reports, during the negotiations over redactions in the Executive Summary, McDonough actively negotiated on behalf of the CIA for more redactions. During the run-up to the Executive Summary's release, Secretary of State John Kerry also reportedly urged Feinstein to delay the release, citing concerns about the coalition against ISIS and American lives and property abroad.

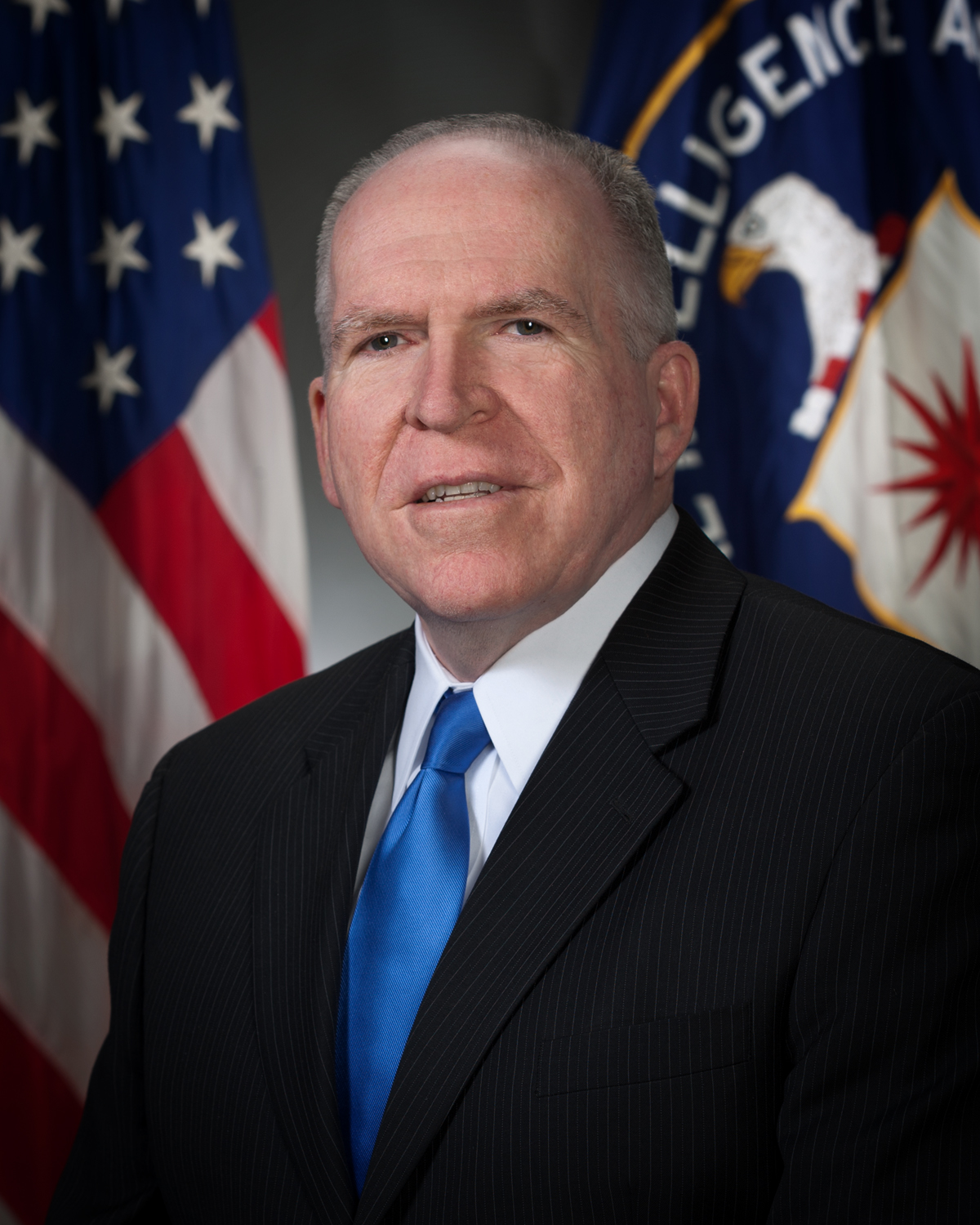
John Brennan was the Director of the Central Intelligence Agency from March 2013 until January 2017

CIA Director John O. Brennan agreed with the current administration's policy prohibiting enhanced interrogation techniques and admitted that the program had had "shortcomings." He disagreed with the Committee's conclusion that information obtained through torture could have been obtained by other means, and said it is unknowable whether other interrogation approaches would have yielded the same information. In supporting his views, Brennan also released a 136-page declassified version of an official CIA response and critique of the torture report written in June 2013. However, the CIA also released a document in December 2014 titled "Note to Readers of The Central Intelligence Agency's Response to the Senate Select Committee on Intelligence's Study of the CIA's Detention and Interrogation Program," in which the CIA admitted that many of its objections were incorrect, including that the State Department may not actually have been aware of CIA black sites in some countries, that CIA personnel had in fact used enhanced interrogation techniques without prior approval, and that some of the information the CIA claimed came from these techniques had not.

The Department of Justice (DOJ) announced that they would not be pursuing bringing any charges against anyone who might have been involved in the use of torture, noting that they "did not find any new information that they had not previously considered in reaching their determination." The Department of Justice had launched two investigations overseen by John Durham in 2009 that also did not result in charges. The rationale for the absence of charges has not been disclosed, but Mr. Durham did say that the full record of the possible evidence of criminal conduct and possible defenses that might be offered by any of those accused were contained in the pages of the Senate committee report that he was not going to release. Thus, it remains impossible for anyone to offer an independent evaluation of whether anyone involved was or was not guilty of criminal conduct. In response to a FOIA lawsuit seeking access to the full report, the Obama administration argued that the rationale for not releasing all the pages of the committee report was that "disclosing them could affect the candor of law enforcement deliberations about whether to bring criminal charges." Given the apparent absence of those public deliberations, such a rationale seems almost incredibly obtuse, especially since, after the release of the Senate's report, several news outlets noted that "the only CIA employee connected to its interrogation program to go to prison" was John Kiriakou, the whistleblower who was "prosecuted for providing information to reporters."

=== Response from Bush administration ===
Three former CIA directors—George Tenet, Porter Goss and Michael V. Hayden—as well as three former CIA deputy directors—John E. McLaughlin, Albert M. Calland III, Stephen Kappes, wrote an op-ed in The Wall Street Journal in response to the release of the Senate Intelligence Committee report. They criticized the report as "a partisan attack on the agency that has done the most to protect America after the 9/11 attacks." They said that the CIA's interrogation program was invaluable to the capture of al Qaeda operatives and the disruption of al Qaeda's efforts and also stated that, contrary to the Senate Intelligence Committee's findings, "there is no doubt that information provided by the totality of detainees in CIA custody […] was essential to bringing bin Laden to justice." Additionally, they wrote that the CIA remained within the interrogation techniques authorized by the DOJ; that the CIA did not mislead the DOJ, White House or Congress; and that the threat of a "'ticking time bomb' scenario" context was critical to understanding the program. Additionally, they established a website to defend the actions of the CIA.

The report's Executive Summary shows that Tenet, Goss, and Hayden all provided inaccurate information to the White House, Congress, and the public about the program, including regarding its effectiveness. It contains over 35 pages of Hayden's testimony to the Senate Intelligence Committee in which he provided inaccurate or misleading information. Additionally, contrary to these officials' claim, there is no evidence that the CIA's interrogation program produced evidence that led to Osama bin Laden. CIA records show that the information came from numerous sources, including CIA-collected signals intelligence, intelligence obtained by foreign governments, and non-coercive CIA interrogation. Also, despite the claim that the CIA remained within DOJ interrogation guidelines, there are numerous examples of interrogators exceeding guidelines, including using interrogation techniques in unauthorized ways, for longer periods of time or in a more extreme way than they were intended to be used.

Former Vice President Dick Cheney, who was in office during the events discussed in the report and participated in numerous meetings regarding enhanced interrogation techniques, said the report's criticisms of the CIA were "a bunch of hooey" and that harsh interrogation tactics were "absolutely, totally justified." He further said that he did not feel that the CIA misled him about the techniques used or the value of the information obtained from them, and that "if I had to do it over again, I would." The report notes that in multiple CIA briefings and documents for Cheney, the Agency repeatedly misrepresented the program's results and effectiveness.

John Yoo, author of the Torture Memos, criticized the report as a partisan attack on American intelligence agencies and defended his belief that the CIA was legally allowed to use interrogation techniques that did not cause injury. Yoo's legal justification, which included the "necessity defense" (that using torture would be legal if necessary in emergency situations), is contrary to both international and domestic law. He also stated that "if the facts on which [he] based [his] advice were wrong, [he] would be willing to change [his] opinion of the interrogation methods." In an interview in CNN's Fareed Zakaria GPS, Yoo said that the harsh treatments outlined in the report could violate anti-torture laws, stating that "[i]f these things happened as described in the report [...] they were not supposed to be done." He voiced a similar opinion in a C-SPAN interview, saying that using the techniques cumulatively could violate anti-torture statute.

== Reception ==
=== Minority response ===
Senate Minority Leader Mitch McConnell, Republican of Kentucky, and Senator Saxby Chambliss, Republican of Georgia, opposed the study saying that they believe "it will present serious consequences for U.S. national security" and that the study was ideologically motivated. They also asserted that the program "developed significant intelligence that helped us identify and capture important al-Qa'ida terrorists, disrupt their ongoing plotting, and take down Usama Bin Ladin." Senators Marco Rubio, Republican of Florida, and Jim Risch, Republican of Idaho, stated that the report was a "partisan effort" by Democrats that "could endanger the lives of Americans overseas" and was not "serious or constructive."

Senator John McCain, Republican of Arizona, himself a victim of torture while a prisoner of war in Vietnam, said in a speech following Feinstein's presentation on the Senate floor that he supported the release of the report, and that those responsible for the interrogation policy had "stained our national honor, did much harm and little practical good."

=== Organizations ===
The American Civil Liberties Union (ACLU) argued that the attorney general should appoint a special prosecutor to conduct a full investigation, with its director Anthony Romero saying the report showed the CIA had committed human rights violations. The Center for Constitutional Rights called for prosecutions of those responsible for the torture and joined a criminal complaint filed in Germany by the European Center for Constitutional and Human Rights.

Kenneth Roth from Human Rights Watch called for prosecutions of senior Bush officials who authorized torture and oversaw its use. Roth stated that failure to prosecute was "more than just a failure of justice" and "means that torture effectively remains a policy option rather than a criminal offense." Steven W. Hawkins, the USA executive director of Amnesty International, called for justice saying, "Under the UN convention against torture, no exceptional circumstances whatsoever can be invoked to justify torture, and all those responsible for authorizing or carrying out torture or other ill-treatment must be fully investigated."

The United Nations's special rapporteur on counter-terrorism and human rights, Ben Emmerson, called for the prosecution of those responsible. He said that the CIA had "commit[ed] systematic crimes and gross violations of international human rights law." Juan E. Méndez, the United Nations' special rapporteur on torture, said in a statement that many governments have used the American use of torture to justify their own abuses, saying "If the U.S. tortures, why can't we do it?" Mendez called the release of the report only the first step and called for "the investigation and prosecution of those who were responsible for ordering, planning or implementing the C.I.A. torture program." Speaking on December 10, the 30th anniversary of the adoption of the United Nations Convention Against Torture, Zeid Ra'ad Al Hussein, the UN High Commissioner for Human Rights, commended the government's release of the report saying, "Few countries will admit that their state apparatus has been practicing torture, and many continue shamelessly to deny it—even when it is well documented..." Zeid called for accountability saying, "In all countries, if someone commits murder, they are prosecuted and jailed. If they commit rape or armed robbery, they are prosecuted and jailed. If they order, enable or commit torture—recognized as a serious international crime—they cannot simply be granted immunity because of political expediency. When that happens, we undermine this exceptional Convention, and – as a number of U.S. political leaders clearly acknowledged yesterday – we undermine our own claims to be civilized societies rooted in the rule of law."

The Rohr Jewish Learning Institute designed a course around the report, investigating the balance between national security and the civil liberties of every individual.

=== International governments ===
Afghan president Ashraf Ghani called the report "shocking" and said that the actions detailed in the report "violated all accepted norms of human rights in the world."

Lithuanian Prime Minister Algirdas Butkevicius called on the U.S. to say whether the CIA used sites in his country to interrogate prisoners.

Former President of Poland Aleksander Kwasniewski said that he put pressure in 2003 on American officials to end interrogations at a secret CIA prison his country hosted, saying, "I told Bush that this cooperation must end and it did end."

Iranian Foreign Ministry spokeswoman Marzieh Afkham said the "shocking report shows violence, extremism, and secrecy as institutionalized in the US security system."

The North Korean government called on the United Nations Security Council to investigate the "most brutal medieval forms" of torture practiced by the CIA at "black sites" around the world.

=== Attempts to preserve copies of the Report ===
The CIA's Inspector General's office told Congress in May 2016 that it had accidentally deleted its only copy of the full report, both in electronic and hard copy forms. The acting Inspector General reportedly uploaded the report to the CIA's internal computer network, followed protocol and destroyed the hard copy. Another staff member then apparently misinterpreted instructions from the Justice Department not to open the file and deleted it from the server.

Only a limited number of copies of the full report were made, and human rights workers are concerned that the CIA might succeed in destroying all copies of this report they found so embarrassing. On December 29, 2016, less than a month before the end of the Obama administration, District Court Judge Royce Lamberth ordered the preservation of the full classified report, in case it was needed during the prosecution or appeal of senior suspects during their Guantanamo Military Commissions. Also in December 2016, President Obama announced that he would include the report in his presidential archive. After 12 years, a request could be made for the declassification process to start for the full report's release.

In June 2017, Senator Richard Burr, then chair of the Senate Intelligence Committee, ordered that Executive Branch agencies return their copies of the report to the committee. The copies preserved for the Guantanamo Bay cases and for Obama's presidential archive would not be returned.

=== McCain-Feinstein amendment ===
Following the release of the executive summary, on November 25, 2015, President Barack Obama signed into law the 2016 National Defense Authorization Act, which included an amendment sponsored by Senators John McCain and Dianne Feinstein to codify into law the ban on enhanced interrogation techniques laid out in President Obama's Executive Order 13491. The amendment restricts national security interrogation to techniques in the Army Field Manual, which the amendment mandated would be reviewed to eliminate any potential abuses the manual allowed. The Senate passed the amendment with a bipartisan vote of 78 to 21.

=== Media ===
- Al-Ba'ath – official newspaper of the Arab Socialist Ba'ath Party – Syria Region said the U.S. "resorted to violent and ineffective measures."
- The report was the lead story on El País.
- Folha de S. Paulo dedicated the first page of its international section to the CIA story.
- Gazeta Wyborcza ran a banner headline entitled "The CIA Tortured and Lied About It."
- An unsigned editorial in the Chinese-state-run Global Times wrote that it revealed "wicked acts" and "gross violations of human rights by the CIA."
- The Globe and Mail and the National Post ran cartoons related to the report.
- The Guardian ran a four-page story with the headline "Torture: The Stain on America."
- La Jornada ran its story on the report with a headline reference to "brutal CIA torture."
- Le Monde led with a story saying the CIA "lied on the gravity of the cruelties inflicted."
- The New York Times editorial board called for a criminal investigation and for the prosecution of Dick Cheney, David Addington, George Tenet, John Yoo, Jay Bybee, and other architects of the torture regime.
- Official media in North Korea quoted a professor at Kim Il-sung University as saying that the United States carries out "brutal tortures and other atrocities" against detainees.
- RT, a Russian state-funded TV network, had a leading story on a report that the U.S. paid Poland to host secret prisons.
- Süddeutsche Zeitung ran the headline "Indictment Against the CIA" while the Frankfurter Allgemeine Zeitung and Die Welt carried the torture story on their front page.
- Russia-24 ran its story on the report with the headline "Shocking honesty."
- The Washington Post ran a blog post about reactions from Iran and North Korea, which were named the "Axis of evil" by then-President George W. Bush.

== See also ==
- Abu Ghraib torture and prisoner abuse
- Bagram torture and prisoner abuse
- Black site
- Alfreda Frances Bikowsky
- CIA transnational human rights actions
- Extrajudicial prisoners of the United States
- Human rights in the United States
- Human rights violations by the CIA
- Interrogation of Abu Zubaydah
- John L. Helgerson
- Stephen Soldz
- The Report (2019 film)
