= Hammdidullah =

- Born: 1972 (age 53–54); Sapolad, Washir, Afghanistan
- Arrested: November 2001 CNN; Afghanistan; CIA
- Released: 2005-04-18; Afghanistan
- Citizenship: Afghanistan
- Detained at: CIA black sites, Guantanamo
- Other name: Janat Gul
- ISN: 953
- Charge: extrajudicial detention
- Penalty: subjected to extensive CIA torture
- Status: eventually determined to have been an innocent civilian, all along
- Occupation: executive

Hammdidullah, a.k.a. Janat Gul, is a citizen of Afghanistan who was held in extrajudicial detention in the United States Guantanamo Bay detainment camp, in Cuba. American counter-terror analysts estimate he was born in 1973, in Sarpolad, Afghanistan.

In December 2014 the United States Senate's Intelligence Committee published a 600-page unclassified summary of its 6,000-page report on the CIA's use of torture. That report identified Janat Gul as one of the individuals tortured by the CIA, in its network of black sites. PBS Frontline reported that he was tortured so badly the CIA's case notes recorded that he had pleaded with his interrogators to just kill him.

He was transferred from CIA to military custody on March 23, 2003. A five-page Joint Task Force Guantanamo detainee assessment, drafted on August 20, 2004, recommended his continued detention. However the Combatant Status Review Tribunal conducted by OARDEC determined that his classification as an "enemy combatant" had been improper all along, and he was released on April 18, 2005.

== Inconsistent identification ==
While the two official lists mention his name as Hammdidullah, his Tribunal addressed him as Janat Gul.

CNN reported that Hammdidullah surrendered on November 24, 2001, but the allegations prepared for his Combatant Status Review Tribunal state that he was captured in January 2003.

== Press accounts of his term at Ariana Airlines ==
Hammdidullah was quoted by the international press during his term at Ariana Airlines. CNN referred to him as Hamidullah.

== Combatant Status Review Tribunal ==
Combatant Status Review Tribunals were held in a trailer the size of a large RV. The captive sat on a plastic garden chair, with his hands and feet shackled to a bolt in the floor. Three chairs were reserved for members of the press, but only 37 of the 574 Tribunals were observed.

Initially the Bush administration asserted that they could withhold all the protections of the Geneva Conventions to captives from the war on terror. This policy was challenged before the Judicial branch. Critics argued that the USA could not evade its obligation to conduct a competent tribunals to determine whether captives are, or are not, entitled to the protections of prisoner of war status.

Subsequently the Department of Defense instituted the Combatant Status Review Tribunals. The Tribunals, however, were not authorized to determine whether the captives were lawful combatants—rather they were merely empowered to make a recommendation as to whether the captive had previously been correctly determined to match the Bush administration's definition of an enemy combatant.

Hammdidullah chose to participate in his Combatant Status Review Tribunal.

=== Allegations ===
The allegations that Hammdidullah faced during his Tribunal were as follows:

a. -- The general summary of the allegations that establish an association with terrorism were missing from the transcript. --
1. The detainee admitted he is a member of the Taliban.
2. The detainee is a former president of Ariana Airlines.
3. The Taliban controlled Ariana Airlines.
4. The Taliban used Ariana Airlines to transport their members.
5. Ariana Airlines provided free flights to Konduz, Afghanistan for individuals joining the fight against the Northern Alliance.
6. Taliban forces utilized Ariana Airlines form Kandahar to Kabul.
7. An active al Qaida member and licensed pilot brought in other al Qaida members to work for Ariana Airlines.
8. An individual with plans to engage in hostilities against the United States had strong ties to Ariana Airlines.
9. The detainee was arrested in January 2003 in Lashkargar, Afghanistan.

=== Witnesses ===
Hammdidullah requested statements from two witnesses, his father Haji Sher Mohammed, and his brother, Haji Agha Gul. The Tribunal's President ruled that his witnesses were relevant, and the State Department was requested to contact the Afghan government to contact Hammdidullah's witnesses. After a month the Tribunal hadn't heard back, so Hammdidullah's witnesses were ruled "not reasonably available".

=== Testimony ===
Gul testified to the following:

- He had never been or admitted to being a member of the Taliban.
- He acknowledged being captured in January 2003, in his home; he said he had welcomed the arrival of the Americans and their help in unseating the Taliban and helping Hamid Karzai's government.
- He had been twice imprisoned by the Taliban.
- He acknowledged working for Ariana Airlines.
- When the Taliban seized him it was in order to forcibly conscript him and send him to the front lines. By accepting the position at Ariana he was able to avoid being press-ganged to the front lines.
- Ariana Airlines did not have any direct ties to the government.
- The Taliban did not control Ariana Airlines; it was a for-profit business.
- The Taliban did not enlist Ariana to transport their members – Taliban members could have bought tickets, like anyone else, but they never chartered any of their planes for their purposes.
- Ariana Airlines did not provide free flights for Taliban recruits – the Taliban had its own fleet of planes for transporting troops.
- He had never heard the allegation that an Ariana Airlines pilot was an al-Qaeda member; Gul said he didn't know any al-Qaeda members, and that all the Ariana employees were civilians.

== Determined not to have been an enemy combatant ==
The Washington Post reports that detainee 953, whom they refer to as Janat Gul, was one of 38 detainees who was determined not to have been an enemy combatant during his Combatant Status Review Tribunal, and was, eventually, released.

== Guantanamo medical records ==
On March 16, 2007 the Department of Defense published medical records for the captives. According to those records Hammdidullah was 67.5 inches (171 cm) tall, and he was weighed just three times: on March 23, 2003, when he weighed 126 pounds (57 kg), and in January and March 2003, when he weighed 113 pounds (51 kg). His records indicate he declined to be weighed in February 2003.

== CIA detention ==
Journalists who reviewed the United States Senate Intelligence Committee's report on the CIA's use of torture concluded that Hammdidullah was still in CIA custody in 2006.
