= Charlie Wise =

American interrogator & torturer

- Died: 2003
- Other names: The New Sheriff; The Preacher; NX2
- Occupation: CIA official
- Known for: played a role in the CIA's torture program

Charlie Wise was a Central Intelligence Agency official who played a role in the agency's torture program. Prior to his resignation, in 2003, Wise was the CIA's Chief of Interrogations.

Wise is said to have been one of the few individuals who were officially authorized to use the torture technique known as Waterboarding.

In December 2014, when the Senate's Intelligence Committee released a 600-page summary of its report on the CIA's use of torture, The Washington Post reported that Wise had called the program a “train [wreck] waiting to happen”. They reported he said “I intend to get the hell off the train before it happens.” According to The Washington Post, he subsequently voluntarily left the program, and resigned from the CIA.

However, on January 25, 2020, while testifying before a Guantanamo Military Commission over his own role in the torture program, outside psychologist James Mitchell said Wise was more extreme than he was, that he went far beyond the authorized techniques. Mitchell testified that he was one of the whistleblowers who reported Wise to the CIA's Inspector General. Mitchell testified that CIA HQ reassigned Wise after receiving those reports.

Mitchell testified that, when he arrived at the torture sites, Wise referred to himself as "the New Sheriff", symbolic of Wise's plans to take over the program.

According to The Washington Post, Wise had played a role in interrogations that used torture, in Beirut. According to The Guardian Wise had taught The Contras how to torture, in Nicaragua. According to Vice magazine Wise was responsible for introducing "rectal feeding", a technique tantamount to anal rape, into interrogations.

Wise suffered a fatal heart attack weeks after his resignation.
