= Stephen Soldz =

American activist and psychoanalyst (born 1952)

- Stephen Soldz, c.2008.
- Born: November 19, 1952 (age 73)
- Citizenship: U.S.A.
- Known for: Political activism
- Scientific career
- Fields: Psychology, Psychotherapy

Stephen Soldz (born November 19, 1952) is a psychoanalyst, clinical psychologist, professor, and anti-war activist. Soldz is director of the Social Justice and Human Rights program at the Boston Graduate School of Psychoanalysis.

In August 2007, Soldz publicly challenged the American Psychological Association to ban the involvement by professional psychologists in the interrogation of 'enemy combatant' prisoners held by the CIA and Defense Department. Soldz, in an interview with the San Francisco Chronicle, publicly accused psychologists attached to the U.S. military base at Guantanamo Bay of developing and applying torture techniques on detainees while advising interrogators on the levels of abuse that detainees could withstand. In November 2007, Soldz coauthored an article on psychological torture at Guantanamo Bay with Julian Assange, published via WikiLeaks.

The American Psychological Association did not pass the ban advocated by Soldz, but instead issued a resolution stating its opposition to torture and restricting its members from participating in interrogations that involved practices that could be defined as torture.

Outside of politics, Soldz and Leigh McCullough co-edited the 1999 book Reconciling Empirical Knowledge and Clinical Experience: The Art and Science of Psychotherapy, published by the American Psychological Association. Also in 1999, Soldz and George E. Vaillant published their article "The Big Five Personality Traits and the Life Course: A 45-Year Longitudinal Study" in the 'Journal of Research in Personality. The journal's editors later named the Soldz-Vaillant article as the publication's most important paper for that year.

== See also ==
- James Elmer Mitchell
