= Mohamed Ahmed Ben Soud =

Libyan torture victim

- Born: 1968 or 1969 (age 57–58).
- Arrested: 2003; Somalia; Central Intelligence Agency
- Released: 2011
- Citizenship: Libya
- Detained at: CIA black sites
- Charge: extrajudicial detention

Mohamed Ahmed Ben Soud was held, and tortured, in the CIA's archipelago of black sites, where it tortured individuals.

Reuters reports Ben Soud is a Tanzanian who the CIA kidnapped in Somalia in 2003. The New York Times reports he is a Libyan who fled Libya and made a home in Pakistan, where he was seized. This report says the CIA transferred him back to Libya, in 2004, the torture state he had fled, where he was imprisoned until the fall of the Muammar Gaddafi regime in 2011. Ben Soud said that, in spite of its grizzly reputation, he was treated better in Libya than he had been by the USA.

Shortly after the Senate Intelligence Committee's report on CIA torture came out the National Journal listed seventeen individuals who the CIA had tortured, without authorization. The National Journal reported how, even though Ben Soud's foot had been broken, while in custody, his interrogators continued to subject him to cruel physical tortures, that aggravated his condition such that a subsequent medical examination concluded, "even given the best prognosis", he "would have arthritis and limitation of motion for the rest of his life."

Ben Soud was one of three individuals who sued Bruce Jessen and James Mitchell, the two psychologists the CIA paid $75 million to advise them on torture. On July 28, 2017, U.S. District Judge Justin Lowe Quackenbush denied both parties motions for summary judgment, noted that the defendants are indemnified by the United States government, and encouraged the attorneys to reach a settlement before trial.

On October 9, 2016, Pulitzer Prize winners Matt Apuzzo, Sheri Fink, and James Risen published a front-page article in the New York Times, entitled "How U.S. Torture Left a Legacy of Damaged Minds". The article recounted Ben Soud's description of the torture he endured, in detail.
