= Bruce Jessen =

American torturer (born 1949)

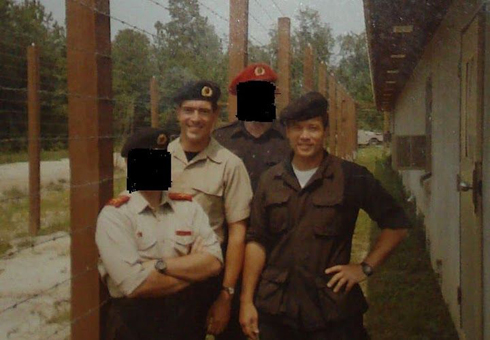
SERE training camp at Fort Bragg. Captain Michael Kearns, Psychologist Bruce Jessen (right)

John Bruce Jessen (born July 28, 1949) is an American psychologist who, with James Elmer Mitchell, created the so-called "enhanced interrogation techniques" that were used in the interrogation and torture of CIA detainees and outlined in the United States Senate Select Committee on Intelligence's report on CIA torture. In that report, he was mentioned under the pseudonym "Hammond Dunbar." His company, Mitchell Jessen and Associates, earned US$81 million for its work.

== Career ==
Jessen attended then-Ricks College, now Brigham Young University-Idaho in Rexburg, Idaho. He graduated cum laude from Utah State University in 1974, where he majored in psychology. He earned his PhD in psychology, with an emphasis in professional-scientific psychology, from Utah State University in 1979. During that time he was commissioned in the Air Force and completed an internship in clinical psychology at Wilford Hall USAF Medical Center in San Antonio, Texas.

A United States Air Force retiree, Jessen, along with James Mitchell, was hired in 2002 by the Central Intelligence Agency to design the so-called "enhanced interrogation techniques" program. The objectives of the program were not merely to obtain intelligence, but to also break down detainees in order to get them to be compliant and submissive to authority.

In 2005, Jessen and Mitchell formed a company called Mitchell Jessen and Associates, with offices in Spokane and Virginia.

On October 15, 2012, Jessen was sustained as bishop of the Spokane 6th Ward of the Church of Jesus Christ of Latter-day Saints. He resigned as bishop one week later.

== Senate Intelligence Committee report on CIA torture ==
The US Senate Report on CIA Detention Interrogation Program that details the use of torture during CIA detention and interrogation.

On December 9, 2014, the United States Senate Select Committee on Intelligence released a report confirming the use of torture and SERE tactics in interrogations. The contractors that developed the "enhanced interrogation techniques" received US$81 million for their services, out of an original contract worth more than US$180 million. NBC News identified the contractors, who were referred to in the report via pseudonyms, as Mitchell, Jessen & Associates from Spokane, Washington, which was run by two psychologists, John "Bruce" Jessen and James Mitchell. The report states that the contractor "developed the list of enhanced interrogation techniques and personally conducted interrogations of some of the CIA's most significant detainees using those techniques. The contractors also evaluated whether the detainees' psychological state allowed for continued use of the techniques, even for some detainees they themselves were interrogating or had interrogated." Mitchell, Jessen & Associates developed a "menu" of 20 enhanced techniques including waterboarding, sleep deprivation, and stress positions. John Rizzo, CIA acting general counsel, described in his book Company Man, that the techniques were "sadistic and terrifying."

== Lawsuit ==
In 2014, The New York Times Editorial board called for the investigation and prosecution of Mitchell and Jessen for their role in developing the torture practices used by the CIA. In 2015, Human Rights Watch called for the prosecution of Jessen "for [his] alleged direct participation in torture, often applied in ways beyond how it was authorized, but also for [his] role in the initial conspiracy to torture as well."

On October 13, 2015, the American Civil Liberties Union filed a lawsuit against James Mitchell and Bruce Jessen on behalf of Mohamed Ahmed Ben Soud, Suleiman Abdullah Salim, and the estate of Gul Rahman, three former detainees who were subjected to the interrogation methods they designed. The suit alleges that the defendants' conduct constituted torture and cruel, inhuman, and degrading treatment; non-consensual human experimentation; and war crimes – "all of which are violations of 'specific, universal, and obligatory' international law norms, as evidenced by numerous binding international treaties, declarations, and other international law instruments". A trial was set for June 2017. On July 28, 2017, U.S. District Judge Justin Lowe Quackenbush denied both parties' motions for summary judgment, noted that the defendants are indemnified by the United States government, and encouraged the attorneys to reach a settlement before trial. A settlement was reached in August 2017.

== Depiction in media ==
Jessen was portrayed in the 2019 film The Report by T. Ryder Smith.

== See also ==
- Nuremberg Code
- Torture and the United States
- Larry C. James
- John Leso
