= Behavioral Science Consultation Team =

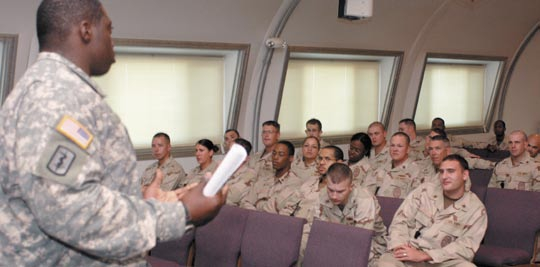
Guantanamo guards receiving a Behavioral Science briefing

The Behavioral Science Consultation Teams (BSCTs, pronounced "biscuits") are groups of psychiatrists, other medical doctors and psychologists who study detainees in American extrajudicial detention.

== History ==
The groups were being officially authorized by the US Department of Defense in mid-2002, following the advice of General Michael E. Dunlavey, later chief interrogator at Guantanamo Bay detention camp. The BSCTs proposed a three-step pattern for harsh interrogations, including sleep deprivation and psychological pressure:

Additional detention conditions they believed would further assist intelligence-gathering operations. These included using fans and generators to create white noise as a form of psychological pressure; restricting "resistant" detainees to no more than four hours of sleep a day; depriving them of "comfort items" such as sheets, blankets, mattresses, and washcloths; and controlling their access to the koran. "All aspects of the [detention] environment," they argued, "should enhance capture shock, dislocate expectations, foster dependence, and support exploitation to the fullest extent possible."

The teams have been criticized for their participation in developing enhanced interrogation of detainees in the war on terror, which has been determined as torture by multiple international organizations, such as Amnesty International.

When Darrel Vandeveld, one of the lawyers assigned to serve as one of military commission prosecutors looked into the case against Mohammed Jawad, one of the individuals he was assigned to prosecute, he realized that the record showed that Jawad, then still a minor, had been subjected to long periods of sleep deprivation, a torture technique that had already been de-authorized, on the advice of Army psychologist Lieutenant Colonel Diane M. Zierhoffer.
