= James Elmer Mitchell =

American psychologist (born 1952)

- Born: 1952 (age 73–74)
- Occupation: Psychologist
- Known for: Developed "enhanced interrogation techniques" for interrogation and torture of CIA high value detainees

James Elmer Mitchell (born 1952) is an American psychologist and former member of the United States Air Force. From 2002, after his retirement from the military, to 2009, his company Mitchell Jessen and Associates received $81 million on contract from the CIA to carry out the interrogation of high value detainees, referred to as "enhanced interrogation techniques".

== Military career ==
Mitchell joined the Air Force in 1975 and was first stationed in Alaska, learning to disarm unexploded ordnance. He was also a hostage negotiator at Lackland Air Force Base in Texas.

He left the military in the early 1980s to earn a master's degree in psychology at the University of Alaska. He then received a Ph.D. in psychology at the University of South Florida in 1986. His dissertation compared diet and exercise in controlling hypertension.

Mitchell returned to the Air Force and in 1988 became the chief of psychology at the Air Force survival school at Fairchild Air Force Base in Spokane, Washington. He succeeded Bruce Jessen, who had moved to an advanced school of survival training at the base. Mitchell supervised the trainers who role-played as enemy interrogators for military personnel going through Survival, Evasion, Resistance and Escape (SERE) training.

In 1996, Mitchell was the psychologist for a unit in the Air Force Special Operations Command at Fort Bragg, North Carolina.

He retired as a Lieutenant Colonel in mid-2001.

== Work as a CIA contractor on interrogation practices ==
After the September 11 attacks, Mitchell was asked by the CIA to develop an interrogation program based on what were believed to be al-Qaeda documents on resisting interrogation. Mitchell and Jessen recommended use of SERE counter-interrogation training, reverse-engineered to obtain intelligence from captives. Mitchell was later reported to have personally waterboarded Khalid Sheikh Mohammed.

In 2005, Mitchell and Bruce Jessen formed a company called Mitchell Jessen and Associates, with offices in Spokane and Virginia and five additional associates, four of them from military SERE programs. By 2007, the company employed around 60 people, including former CIA interrogator Deuce Martinez; Karen Gardner, a former senior training official at the FBI Academy, and Roger Aldrich.

In April 2009, the CIA canceled the contract with Mitchell and Jessen's company, after having paid $81 million out of the authorized $180 million. The CIA Inspector General concluded that there was no scientific reason to believe that the program Mitchell designed was medically safe or would produce reliable information. The CIA agreed as part of the contract to provide legal costs for Mitchell and Jessen of at least $5 million if necessary.

Mitchell's identity in the interview program was made public by Vanity Fair in 2007 and further analyzed by The New York Times in 2009. In a 2014 interview with The Guardian, Mitchell defended the program and his role, but said that his ability to defend himself was curtailed as he could not speak on specifics due to a signed non-disclosure agreement with the government. In the 2016 book Enhanced Interrogation (written with co-author Bill Harlow), Mitchell provides more details and background information on the interrogation program.

=== Senate Intelligence Committee report on CIA torture ===
The US Senate Report on CIA Detention Interrogation Program that details the use of torture during CIA detention and interrogation.

On December 9, 2014, the United States Senate Select Committee on Intelligence released a report confirming the use of torture and SERE tactics in interrogations. The contractors that developed the "enhanced interrogation techniques" received US$81 million for their services, out of a contract with a potential value in excess of US$180 million. NBC News identified the contractors, who were referred to in the report via pseudonyms, as Mitchell, Jessen & Associates from Spokane, Washington, a company run by two psychologists, John "Bruce" Jessen and James Mitchell. Jessen had been a senior psychologist at the Defense Department where he taught special forces how to resist and endure torture. The Intelligence Committee report states that the contractor "developed the list of enhanced interrogation techniques and personally conducted interrogations of some of the CIA's most significant detainees using those techniques. The contractors also evaluated whether the detainees' psychological state allowed for continued use of the techniques, even for some detainees they themselves were interrogating or had interrogated." Mitchell, Jessen & Associates developed a "menu" of 20 enhanced techniques including waterboarding, sleep deprivation and stress positions. The CIA acting general counsel, described in his book Company Man, that the enhanced techniques were "sadistic and terrifying."

The report said Mitchell "had reviewed research on learned helplessness, in which individuals might become passive and depressed in response to adverse or uncontrollable events. He theorized that inducing such a state could encourage a detainee to cooperate and provide information."

When contacted about his role in the controversial program in the aftermath of its publishing, Mitchell confirmed that he signed a non-disclosure agreement with the government which prevented his confirming or denying his involvement. "[E]veryone is assuming it is me, but I can't confirm or deny it. It is frustrating because you can't defend yourself."

=== Testimony at Guantanamo Military Commissions ===
For years there was press speculation over whether the Presiding Officer would or would not allow Defense Counsel to call Mitchell or Jessen as witnesses at Guantanamo Military Commission. Mitchell was finally called upon to testify in January, 2020. During his testimony Mitchell portrayed himself as less radical than CIA officials, like Charlie Wise, then the CIA's director of interrogations.

== Ethics complaint in Texas ==
In 2010, psychologist Jim L. H. Cox filed a formal ethics complaint against Mitchell in Texas, where Mitchell was a licensed psychologist, alleging that he had violated the profession's rules of practice by helping the CIA develop "enhanced interrogation techniques." Although Mitchell was not a member, the American Psychological Association sent a letter to the Texas State Board of Examiners of Psychologists stating that the actions alleged by the complainant to have been committed by Dr. Mitchell were "patently unethical," and that longstanding APA policy strictly prohibited psychologists from being involved "in any form of torture or other types of cruel, degrading or inhuman treatment or punishment." The APA justified its intervention by stating that "the allegations put forward in the complaint and those that are on the public record about Dr. Mitchell are simply so serious, and if true, such a gross violation of his professional ethics, that we felt it necessary to act." When asked about the allegations, Dr. Mitchell called the complaint libelous and "riddled throughout with fabricated details, lies, distortions and inaccuracies."

The Board dismissed the complaint against Dr. Mitchell on February 10, 2011, saying there wasn't enough evidence to prove Dr. Mitchell violated its rules.

== Lawsuit ==
In 2014, The New York Times editorial board called for the investigation and prosecution of Mitchell and Jessen for their role in developing the torture practices used by the CIA. In 2015, Human Rights Watch called for the prosecution of Jessen "for [his] alleged direct participation in torture, often applied in ways beyond how it was authorized, but also for [his] role in the initial conspiracy to torture as well."

On October 13, 2015, the American Civil Liberties Union filed a lawsuit against James Mitchell and Bruce Jessen on behalf of Mohamed Ahmed Ben Soud, Suleiman Abdullah Salim, and the estate of Gul Rahman, three former detainees who were subjected to the interrogation methods they designed. The suit alleges that the defendants' conduct constituted torture and cruel, inhuman, and degrading treatment; non-consensual human experimentation; and war crimes—"all of which are violations of 'specific, universal, and obligatory' international law norms, as evidenced by numerous binding international treaties, declarations, and other international law instruments." A trial was set for June 2017. On July 28, 2017, U.S. District Judge Justin Lowe Quackenbush denied both parties' motions for summary judgment, noted that the defendants are indemnified by the United States government, and encouraged the attorneys to reach a settlement before trial. The lawsuit settled in August 2017.

== Personal life ==
Mitchell, who is retired and lives in Land o' Lakes, Florida, spends his free time kayaking, rafting and climbing. He describes himself as an atheist and a supporter of Amnesty International.

== Depiction in media ==
Mitchell was portrayed in the 2019 film The Report by Douglas Hodge.

Mitchell's techniques are described by Spencer Ackerman's report for Forever Wars on the military commissions about the post-9/11 torture program.

== Books ==
- Enhanced Interrogation: Inside the Minds and Motives of the Islamic Terrorists Trying To Destroy America , James E Mitchell, Bill Harlow (2016). ISBN 978-1101906842

== See also ==
- Interrogation of Abu Zubaydah
- Larry C. James
- Steven Kleinman
- John Leso
