= Waterboarding =

Torture method simulating drowning

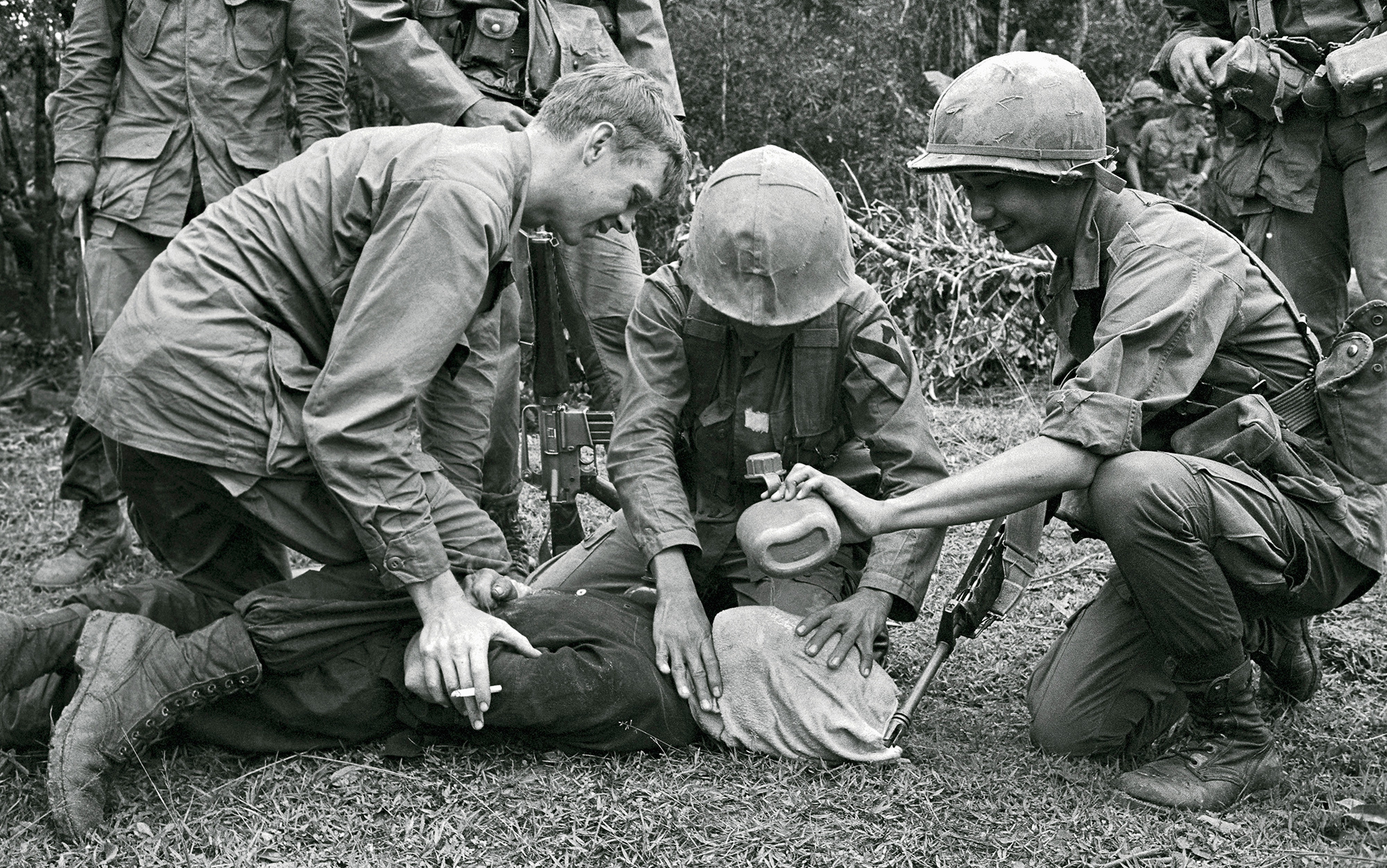
Two United States soldiers and one South Vietnamese soldier waterboard a captured North Vietnamese prisoner of war near Da Nang. Published on the front cover of The Washington Post on 21 January 1968.

Waterboarding or controlled drowning is a form of torture in which water is poured over a cloth covering the nose and mouth of an immobilized captive, causing the person to experience the sensation of drowning. In the most common method of waterboarding, the captive's face is covered with cloth or some other thin material and they are immobilized on their back at an incline of 10 to 20 degrees. Torturers pour water onto the face over the breathing passages, causing an almost immediate gag reflex and creating a drowning sensation for the captive. Waterboarding can cause extreme pain, damage to lungs, brain damage from oxygen deprivation, other physical injuries including broken bones due to struggling against restraints, and lasting psychological damage. Adverse physical effects can last for months, and psychological effects for years.

The term "water board torture" appeared in press reports as early as 1976. The method has been used in diverse places and at various points in history, including the Spanish and Flemish Inquisitions, by the United States military during the Philippine–American War, by Japanese and German officials during World War II, by the French in the Algerian War, by the U.S. during the Vietnam War and the war on terror, by the Pinochet regime in Chile, by the Khmer Rouge in Cambodia, by British security forces during the Troubles, by South African police during the Apartheid era and by Israel during the Gaza genocide. Historically, waterboarding has been viewed as an especially severe form of torture.

== Origin of the term ==
While the technique has been used in various forms for centuries, the term water board was recorded first in an April 1976 newspaper article by United Press International (UPI): "A Navy spokesman admitted use of the 'water board' torture ... to 'convince each trainee that he won't be able to physically resist what an enemy would do to him.'" The verb-noun waterboarding appeared in newspapers by May 2004. Techniques using forcible drowning to extract information had hitherto been referred to as "water torture", "water treatment", "water cure" or simply "torture". Professor Darius Rejali of Reed College, author of Torture and Democracy (2007), has speculated that the term waterboarding probably had its origin in the need for a euphemism.

== Technique ==
The practice of waterboarding has differed. During the Algerian War of Independence and Marcos' dictatorship in the Philippines, waterboarding involved forcing the victim to swallow or inhale water. Other forms of waterboarding prevent water from entering the lungs. The United States Army's Survival, Evasion, Resistance and Escape (SERE) training occasionally included waterboarding, in a less severe form that only mimicked drowning. Different accounts of waterboarding by the United States disagree about how it is practiced. Some accounts describe saturated cloth and water being used to create a misperception of drowning, while others describe water entering the body.

The United States' Office of Legal Counsel in August 2002 responded to the request by the CIA for a legal opinion regarding the use of certain interrogation techniques. It included the following account of the CIA's definition of waterboarding in the Torture Memos as follows:

In this procedure, the individual is bound securely to an inclined bench, which is approximately four feet by seven feet. The individual's feet are generally elevated. A cloth is placed over the forehead and eyes. Water is then applied to the cloth in a controlled manner. As this is done, the cloth is lowered until it covers both the nose and mouth. Once the cloth is saturated and completely covers the mouth and nose, air flow is slightly restricted for 20 to 40 seconds due to the presence of the cloth... During those 20 to 40 seconds, water is continuously applied from a height of twelve to twenty-four inches. After this period, the cloth is lifted, and the individual is allowed to breathe unimpeded for three or four full breaths... The procedure may then be repeated. The water is usually applied from a canteen cup or small watering can with a spout... You have... informed us that it is likely that this procedure would not last more than twenty minutes in any one application.

Historically in the West, the technique is known to have been used in the Spanish Inquisition. The suffocation of bound prisoners with water has been favored because, unlike most other torture techniques, it produces no marks on the body. CIA officers who have subjected themselves to the technique have lasted an average of 14 seconds before refusing to continue.

=== Reported demonstrations ===
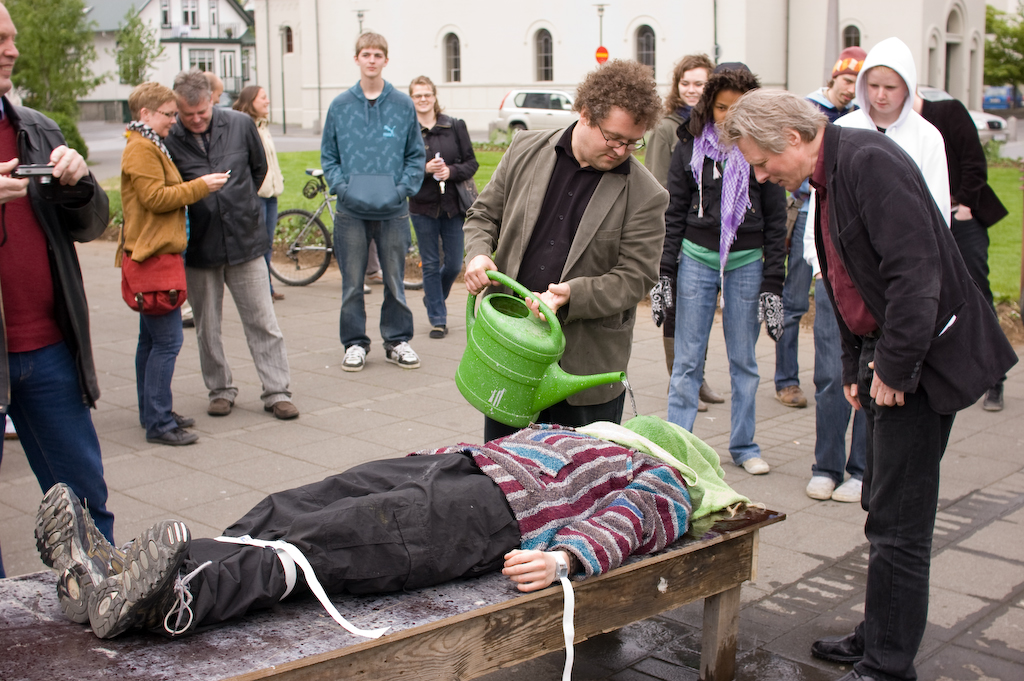
Demonstration of waterboarding at a street protest during a visit by Condoleezza Rice to Iceland, May 2008

In 2006 and 2007, Fox News and Current TV, respectively, demonstrated a waterboarding technique. In the videos, each correspondent is held against a board by the torturers.

Christopher Hitchens voluntarily subjected himself to a filmed demonstration of waterboarding in 2008, an experience which he recounted in Vanity Fair. He was bound on a horizontal board with a black mask over his face. A group of men said to be highly trained in this tactic, who requested anonymity, carried out the torture. Hitchens was strapped to the board at the chest and feet, face up, and unable to move. Metal objects were placed in each of his hands, which he could drop if feeling "unbearable stress", and he was given a code word that, if said, would immediately end the exercise. The interrogator placed a towel over Hitchens' face and poured water on it. After 16 seconds, Hitchens threw the metal objects to the floor and the torturers pulled the mask from his face, allowing him to breathe. Hitchens, who had previously expressed skepticism over waterboarding being considered a form of torture, changed his mind. Hitchens said of the matter:

You may have read by now the official lie about this treatment, which is that it "simulates" the feeling of drowning. This is not the case. You feel that you are drowning because you are drowning—or, rather, being drowned, albeit slowly and under controlled conditions and at the mercy (or otherwise) of those who are applying the pressure.

== Mental and physical effects ==
Allen Keller, the director of the Bellevue Hospital/New York University Program for Survivors of Torture, has treated "a number of people" who had been subjected to forms of near-asphyxiation, including waterboarding. In an interview for The New Yorker, he argued that "it was indeed torture. 'Some victims were still traumatized years later', he said. One patient couldn't take showers, and panicked when it rained. 'The fear of being killed is a terrifying experience', he said". Keller also gave a full description in 2007 in testimony before the U.S. Senate Select Committee on Intelligence on the practice.

The CIA's Office of Medical Services noted in a 2003 memo that "for reasons of physical fatigue or psychological resignation, the subject may simply give up, allowing excessive filling of the airways and loss of consciousness".

In an open letter in 2007 to U.S. Attorney General Alberto Gonzales, Human Rights Watch asserted that waterboarding can cause the sort of "severe pain" prohibited by 18 U.S.C. § 2340 (the implementation in the United States of the United Nations Convention Against Torture), that the psychological effects can last long after waterboarding ends (another of the criteria under 18 USC 2340), and that uninterrupted waterboarding can ultimately cause death.

== Classification as torture ==
Waterboarding is considered to be torture by a wide range of authorities, including legal experts, politicians, war veterans, intelligence officials, military judges, and human rights organizations. David Miliband, then United Kingdom Foreign Secretary, described it as torture on 19 July 2008, and stated "the UK unreservedly condemns the use of torture". Arguments have been put forward in the United States that it might not be torture in all cases, or that it is unclear. The U.S. State Department has recognized "submersion of the head in water" as torture in other circumstances, for example, in its 2005 Country Report on Tunisia.

The United Nations' Report of the Committee Against Torture: Thirty-fifth Session of November 2006, stated that state parties should rescind any interrogation techniques, such as waterboarding, that constitutes torture or cruel, inhuman, or degrading treatment or punishment.

=== Classification in the U.S. ===
Whether waterboarding should be classified as a method of torture was not widely debated in the United States until it was alleged, in 2004, that members of the CIA had used the technique against certain suspected detained terrorists.

Subsequently, the U.S. government released the Bybee memo, a memorandum dated 1 August 2002, from Jay Bybee at the Office of Legal Counsel for White House Counsel Alberto Gonzales. The OLC memo concluded that waterboarding did not constitute torture and could be used to interrogate enemy combatants. Bybee reasoned that "in order for pain or suffering to rise to the level of torture, the statute requires that it be severe" and that waterboarding did not cause severe pain or suffering either physically or mentally. A separate memo in July 2002, written by the Defense Department's Joint Personnel Recovery Agency, described the use of waterboarding and other techniques of extreme duress as "torture" and said that its use could yield unreliable information, and warned that "The unintended consequence of a U.S. policy that provides for the torture of prisoners is that it could be used by our adversaries as justification for the torture of captured U.S. personnel." This memo was forwarded to the Defense Department Office of the General Counsel, and then to the CIA's acting general counsel and Justice Department, even as the George W. Bush administration authorized waterboarding and other measures.

For over three years during the George W. Bush administration, the Justice Department's Office of Professional Responsibility conducted an investigation into the propriety of the Bybee memo and other memos by the Justice Department on waterboarding and other "enhanced" interrogation techniques. The OPR report findings were that former Deputy AAG John Yoo committed intentional professional misconduct and that former AAG Jay Bybee committed professional misconduct. These findings were dismissed in a memo from Associate Deputy Attorney General David Margolis, who found that Yoo showed "poor judgment" but did not violate ethical standards. Commentators have noted that the memos omitted key relevant precedents, including a Texas precedent under then-Governor George W. Bush when the state convicted and sentenced to prison for ten years a county sheriff for waterboarding a criminal suspect. Bush did not issue a pardon for the sheriff.

Former George W. Bush administration officials Dick Cheney and John Ashcroft have stated since leaving office that they do not consider waterboarding to be torture. At least one Republican member of the U.S. Congress, Ted Poe, has taken a similar position.

Other Republican officials have provided less definitive views regarding whether waterboarding is torture. Andrew C. McCarthy, a former Republican prosecutor including in the George W. Bush administration, has stated that when used in "some number of instances that were not prolonged or extensive", waterboarding should not qualify as torture under the law. McCarthy has also stated that "waterboarding is close enough to torture that reasonable minds can differ on whether it is torture" and that "[t]here shouldn't be much debate that subjecting someone to [waterboarding] repeatedly would cause the type of mental anguish required for torture".

Many former senior George W. Bush administration officials, on the other hand, have seriously questioned or directly challenged the legality of waterboarding. These include former State Department Counselor Philip Zelikow, former Deputy Secretary of State Richard Armitage, former Homeland Security Chief Tom Ridge, former head of the Office of Legal Counsel Jack Goldsmith, General Ricardo Sanchez, FBI Director Robert Mueller, and former Convening Authority for the Guantanamo military commissions Susan J. Crawford.

During his tenure as head of the Justice Department's Office of Legal Counsel in 2003–2004, Jack Goldsmith put a halt to the use of waterboarding as an interrogation technique because of serious concern over its legality, but Goldsmith's order was quickly reversed by others within the George W. Bush administration.

A Republican 2008 candidate for president—Senator John McCain, who himself was tortured during his 5 1/2 years as a prisoner of war in North Vietnam during the Vietnam War—has stated unequivocally several times that he considers waterboarding to be torture:

waterboarding, ...is a mock execution and thus an exquisite form of torture. As such, they are prohibited by American laws and values, and I oppose them.

Professors such as Wilson R. Huhn have also challenged the legality of waterboarding.

In May 2008, author and journalist Christopher Hitchens voluntarily underwent waterboarding and concluded that it was torture. He also noted that he suffered ongoing psychological effects from the ordeal.

On May 22, 2009, radio talk show host Erich "Mancow" Muller subjected himself to waterboarding to prove that it is not torture, but changed his mind because of the experience.

On April 22, 2009, Fox News host Sean Hannity offered to be waterboarded for charity in order to prove that it did not amount to torture, though he did not follow through with it.

In a May 11, 2009 interview with Larry King, former Minnesota Governor Jesse Ventura stated:

[Waterboarding is] drowning. It gives you the complete sensation that you are drowning. It is no good, because you—I'll put it to you this way, you give me a water board, Dick Cheney and one hour, and I'll have him confess to the Sharon Tate murders. ... If it's done wrong, you certainly could drown. You could swallow your tongue. [It] could do a whole bunch of stuff to you. If it's done wrong or—it's torture, Larry. It's torture.

On January 15, 2009, U.S. President-elect Barack Obama's nominee for Attorney General, Eric Holder, told his Senate confirmation hearing that waterboarding is torture and the President cannot authorize it. In a press conference on April 30, President Obama also stated, "I believe waterboarding was torture, and it was a mistake."

=== Description by U.S. media ===
In covering the debate on the use of waterboarding as an interrogation technique by the U.S. government, U.S. reporters had to decide whether to use the term "torture" or "enhanced interrogation techniques" to describe waterboarding. National Public Radio's ombudsman detailed this debate and why NPR had decided to refrain from using the word torture to describe waterboarding. Due to criticism of the policy by the media and to NPR directly, a second piece was written to further explain their position and a desire to describe the technique rather than simply describe it as torture.

== Historical uses ==
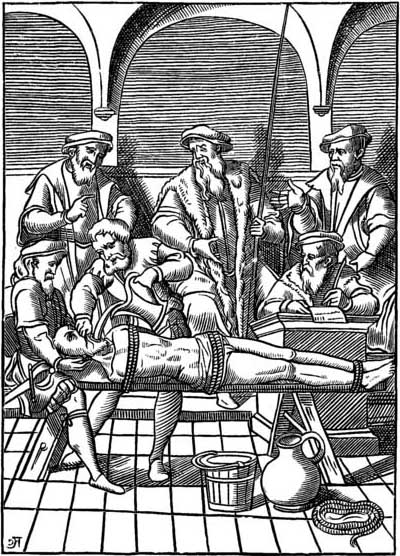
The Water Torture—Facsimile of a woodcut in J. Damhoudère's Praxis Rerum Criminalium, Antwerp, 1556

=== Spanish Inquisition ===
A form of torture similar to waterboarding is called toca, and more recently "Spanish water torture", to differentiate it from the better known Chinese water torture, along with garrucha (or strappado) and the most frequently used potro (or the rack). This was used infrequently during the trial portion of the Spanish Inquisition process. "The toca, also called tortura del agua, consisted of introducing a cloth into the mouth of the victim, and forcing them to ingest water spilled from a jar so that they had the impression of drowning". William Schweiker claims that the use of water as a form of torture also had profound religious significance to the Inquisitors.

In general, the use of waterboarding seemed to be extensive in Spanish detention centers of the 1500s. Books from the time explain how to treat persons in custody, and used this "light" form of torture. After a specific way of beating, body, legs and arms, it was detailed how to pour 4 cuartillos (approx. 2.5 liters) of water over mouth and nose, with a covering cloth, making sure there was some cloth introduced in the mouth so water could also get in.

=== Flemish Inquisition ===
In Joos de Damhouder's Praxis rerum criminalium (1554), a manual on the practice of criminal law, the chapter on torture and interrogation is illustrated with a woodcut of waterboarding, which it describes in detail. The Martyr's Mirror depicts one incident of waterboarding used against the early Mennonites thus:

And as they did still not obtain anything from me, to the implication of my neighbor, Master Hans took water (during the entire time a cloth had lain on my face), and holding my nose shut with one hand, began to pour water on my abdomen and thence all over my breast, and into my mouth; even as one should drink when he is very thirsty. I think that the can from which he poured out – the water held about three pints. And when I was at the end of my breath, and wanted to fetch such, I drew the water all into my body, whereupon I suffered such distress, that it would be impossible for me to relate or describe it; but the Lord be forever praised: He kept my lips. And when they could still not obtain anything from me, they caused the cord which was on my thigh to be loosed and applied to a fresh place, and wound it much tighter than before, so that I thought he would kill me, and began to shake and tremble greatly. He then proceeded to pour water into me again, so that I think he emptied four such cans, and my body became so full of it, that twice it came out again at the throat. And thus I became so weak. that I fainted; for, when I recovered from my swoon, I found myself alone with Master Hans and Daniel de Keyser. And Master Hans was so busily engaged in loosing all my cords, that it seemed to me that they were concerned over me. But the Lord in a large degree took away my pain every time; whenever it became so severe that I thought it was impossible to bear it, my members became as dead. Eternal praise, thanks, honor, and glory be to the Lord; for when it was over I thought that, by the help of the Lord, I had fought a good fight.

=== Colonial times ===
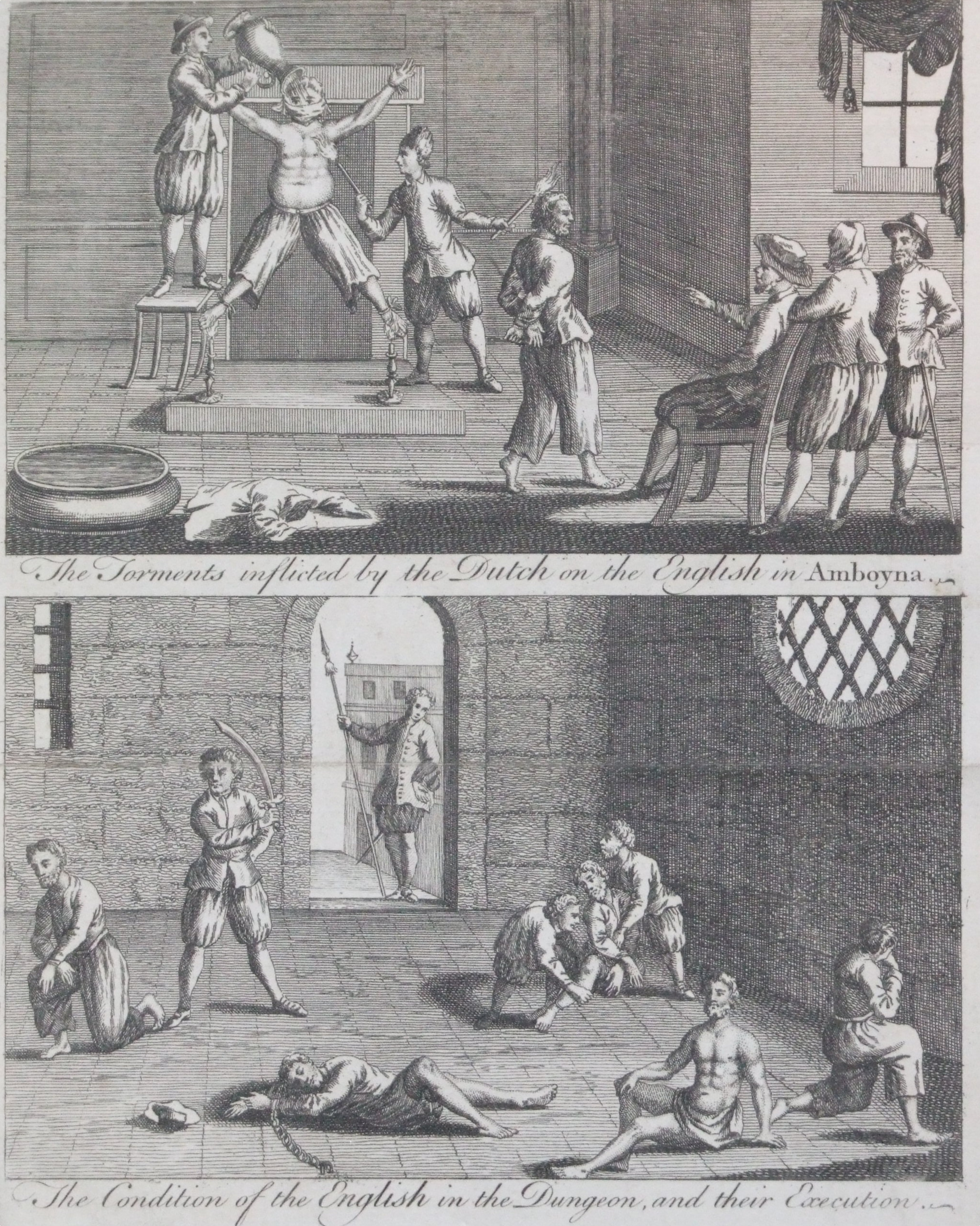
Torture of the English by the Dutch according to the English account

Agents of the Dutch East India Company used a precursor to waterboarding during the Amboyna massacre of English prisoners, which took place on the island of Amboyna in the Molucca Islands in 1623. At that time, it consisted of wrapping cloth around the victim's head, after which the torturers "poured the water softly upon his head until the cloth was full, up to the mouth and nostrils, and somewhat higher, so that he could not draw breath but he must suck in all the water". In one case, the torturer applied water three or four times successively until the victim's "body was swollen twice or thrice as big as before, his cheeks like great bladders, and his eyes staring and strutting out beyond his forehead".

=== American prisons before World War I ===
An editorial in The New York Times of 6 April 1852, and a subsequent 21 April 1852 letter to the editors documents an incidence of waterboarding, then called "showering" or "hydropathic torture", in New York's Sing Sing prison of an inmate named Henry Hagan, who, after several other forms of beating and mistreatment, had his head shaved, and "certainly three, and possibly a dozen, barrels of water were poured upon his naked scalp". Hagan was then placed in a yoke. A correspondent listed only as "H" later wrote: "Perhaps it would be well to state more fully the true character of this 'hydropathic torture.' The stream of water is about one inch in diameter, and falls from a hight [sic] of seven or eight feet. The head of the patient is retained in its place by means of a board clasping the neck; the effect of which is, that the water, striking upon the board, rebounds into the mouth and nostrils of the victim, almost producing strangulation. Congestion, sometimes of the heart or lungs, sometimes of the brain, not unfrequently [sic] ensues; and death, in due season, has released some sufferers from the further ordeal of the water cure. As the water is administered officially, I suppose that it is not murder!" H. then went on to cite an 1847 New York law which limited prison discipline to individual confinement "upon a short allowance."

Prisoners in late 19th-century Alabama, and in Mississippi in the first third of the 20th century, also suffered waterboarding. In Alabama, in lieu of or in addition to other physical punishment, a "prisoner was strapped down on his back; then 'water [was] poured in his face on the upper lip, and effectually stop[ped] his breathing as long as there [was] a constant stream'." In Mississippi, the accused was held down, and water was poured "from a dipper into the nose so as to strangle him, thus causing pain and horror, for the purpose of forcing a confession."

=== During the Philippine–American War ===
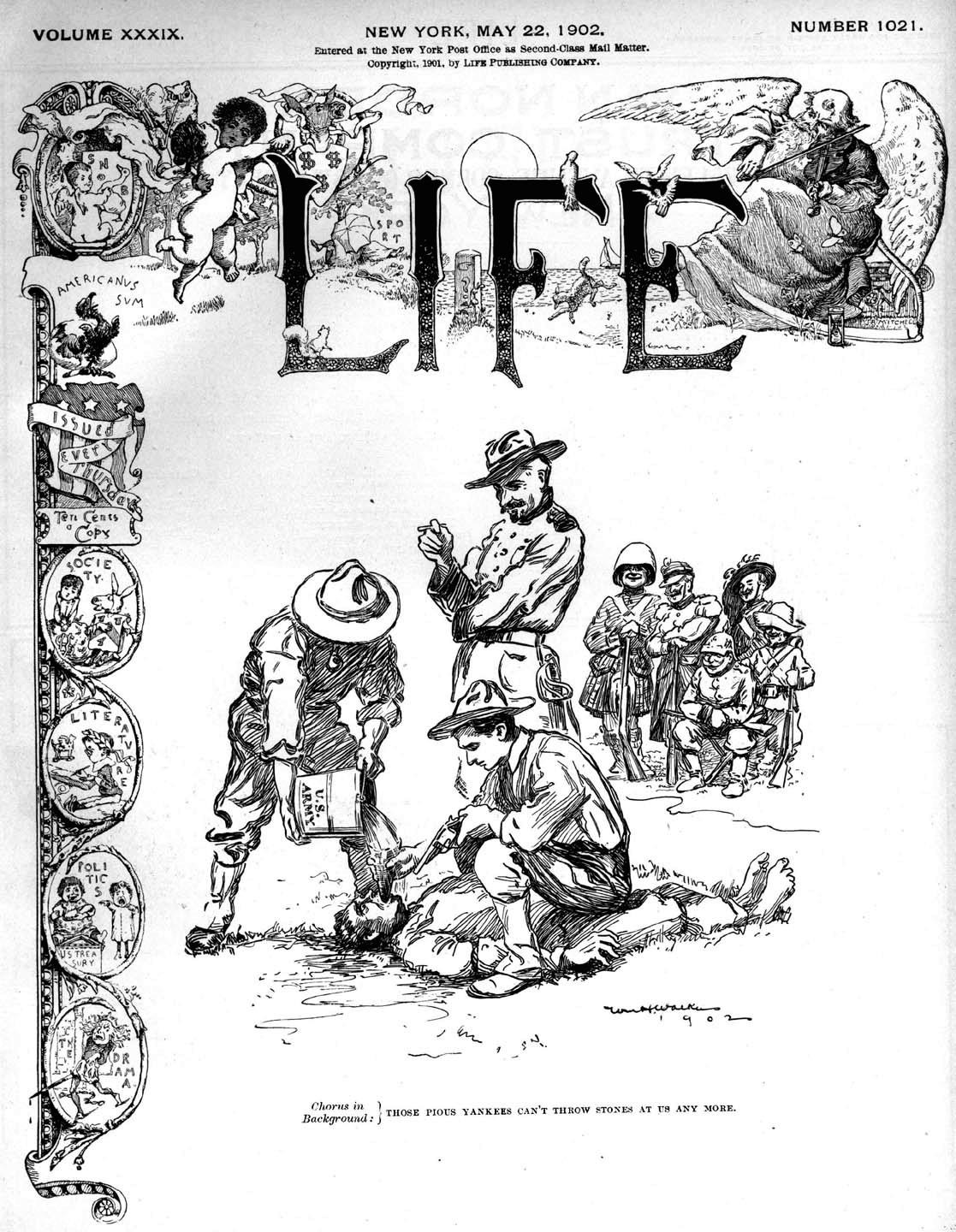
1902 Life magazine cover, depicting water curing by U.S. troops in the Philippines

The U.S. army used waterboarding, called the "water cure", during the Philippine–American War. It is not clear where this practice came from; it probably was adopted from the Filipinos, who themselves adopted it from the Spanish. Reports of "cruelties" from soldiers stationed in the Philippines led to Senate hearings on U.S. activity there.

Testimony described the waterboarding of Tobeniano Ealdama "while supervised by ...Captain/Major Edwin F. Glenn". Elihu Root, United States Secretary of War, ordered a court martial for Glenn in April 1902." During the trial, Glenn "maintained that the torture of Ealdama was 'a legitimate exercise of force under the laws of war.'" Though some reports seem to confuse Ealdama with Glenn, Glenn was found guilty and "sentenced to a one-month suspension and a fifty-dollar fine", the leniency of the sentence due to the "circumstances" presented at the trial.

President Theodore Roosevelt privately rationalized the instances of "mild torture, the water cure" but publicly called for efforts to "prevent the occurrence of all such acts in the future". In that effort, he ordered the court-martial of General Jacob H. Smith on the island of Samar, "where some of the worst abuses had occurred". When the court-martial found only that he had acted with excessive zeal, Roosevelt disregarded the verdict and had the General dismissed from the Army.

Roosevelt soon declared victory in the Philippines, and the public lost interest in "what had, only months earlier, been alarming revelations".

=== By U.S. police before the 1940s ===
The use of "third degree interrogation" techniques to compel confession, ranging from "psychological duress such as prolonged confinement to extreme violence and torture", was widespread in early American policing. Lassiter classified the water cure as "orchestrated physical abuse", and described the police technique as a "modern day variation of the method of water torture that was popular during the Middle Ages". The technique employed by the police involved either holding the head in water until almost drowning, or laying on the back and forcing water into the mouth or nostrils. Such techniques were classified as "'covert' third degree torture" since they left no signs of physical abuse, and became popular after 1910 when the direct application of physical violence to force a confession became a media issue and some courts began to deny obviously compelled confessions. The publication of this information in 1931 as part of the Wickersham Commission's "Report on Lawlessness in Law Enforcement" led to a decline in the use of third degree police interrogation techniques in the 1930s and 1940s.

=== World War II ===
During World War II, both Japanese military personnel, especially the Kempeitai, the Japanese police against those suspected of spying, and the officers of the Gestapo, the German secret police, used waterboarding as a method of torture. During the Japanese occupation of Singapore, the Double Tenth Incident occurred. This included waterboarding, by the method of binding or holding down the victim on his back, placing a cloth over his mouth and nose, and pouring water onto the cloth. In this version, interrogation continued during the torture, with the interrogators beating the victim if he did not reply and the victim swallowing water if he opened his mouth to answer or breathe. When the victim could ingest no more water, the interrogators would beat or jump on his distended stomach.

Chase J. Nielsen, one of the U.S. airmen who flew in the Doolittle Raid following the attack on Pearl Harbor, was subjected to waterboarding by his Japanese captors. At their trial for war crimes following the war, he testified "Well, I was put on my back on the floor with my arms and legs stretched out, one guard holding each limb. The towel was wrapped around my face and put across my face and water poured on. They poured water on this towel until I was almost unconscious from strangulation, then they would let up until I'd get my breath, then they'd start over again... I felt more or less like I was drowning, just gasping between life and death." In 2007, Senator John McCain said that the United States military hanged Japanese soldiers for waterboarding American prisoners of war during World War II. A minimal sentence for Japanese soldiers convicted of waterboarding American soldiers was 15 years.

=== By the French in the Algerian War ===
The technique was also used during the Algerian War (1954–1962). French journalist Henri Alleg, who was subjected to waterboarding by French paratroopers in Algeria in 1957, is one of only a few people to have described in writing the first-hand experience of being waterboarded. His book La Question, published in 1958 with a preface by Jean-Paul Sartre subsequently banned in France until the end of the Algerian War in 1962, discusses the experience of being strapped to a plank, having his head wrapped in cloth and positioned beneath a running tap:

The rag was soaked rapidly. Water flowed everywhere: in my mouth, in my nose, all over my face. But for a while I could still breathe in some small gulps of air. I tried, by contracting my throat, to take in as little water as possible and to resist suffocation by keeping air in my lungs for as long as I could. But I couldn't hold on for more than a few moments. I had the impression of drowning, and a terrible agony, that of death itself, took possession of me. In spite of myself, all the muscles of my body struggled uselessly to save me from suffocation. In spite of myself, the fingers of both my hands shook uncontrollably. "That's it! He's going to talk", said a voice. The water stopped running and they took away the rag. I was able to breathe. In the gloom, I saw the lieutenants and the captain, who, with a cigarette between his lips, was hitting my stomach with his fist to make me throw out the water I had swallowed.

Alleg stated that he did not break under his ordeal of being waterboarded. He also stated that the incidence of "accidental" death of prisoners being subjected to waterboarding in Algeria was "very frequent".

=== Vietnam War ===
Waterboarding was designated as illegal by U.S. generals in the Vietnam War. On 21 January 1968, The Washington Post published a controversial front-page photograph of two U.S. soldiers and one South Vietnamese soldier participating in the waterboarding of a North Vietnamese POW near Da Nang. The article described the practice as "fairly common". The photograph led to the soldier being court-martialled by a U.S. military court within one month of its publication, and he was discharged from the army. Another waterboarding photograph of the same scene, referred to as "water torture" in the caption, is also exhibited in the War Remnants Museum in Ho Chi Minh City. After reports by Lieutenant Colonel Anthony Herbert, investigators confirmed that military interrogators of the 173rd Airborne Brigade "repeatedly beat prisoners, tortured them with electric shocks and forced water down their throats". Interrogators employed a technique called the "water rag", which involved pouring water onto a rag covering the captive's nose and mouth.

=== Pinochet dictatorship in Chile ===
Based on the testimonies from more than 35,000 victims of the Pinochet regime, the Chilean Commission on Political Imprisonment and Torture concluded that provoking a near-death experience by waterboarding is torture.

=== Khmer Rouge ===
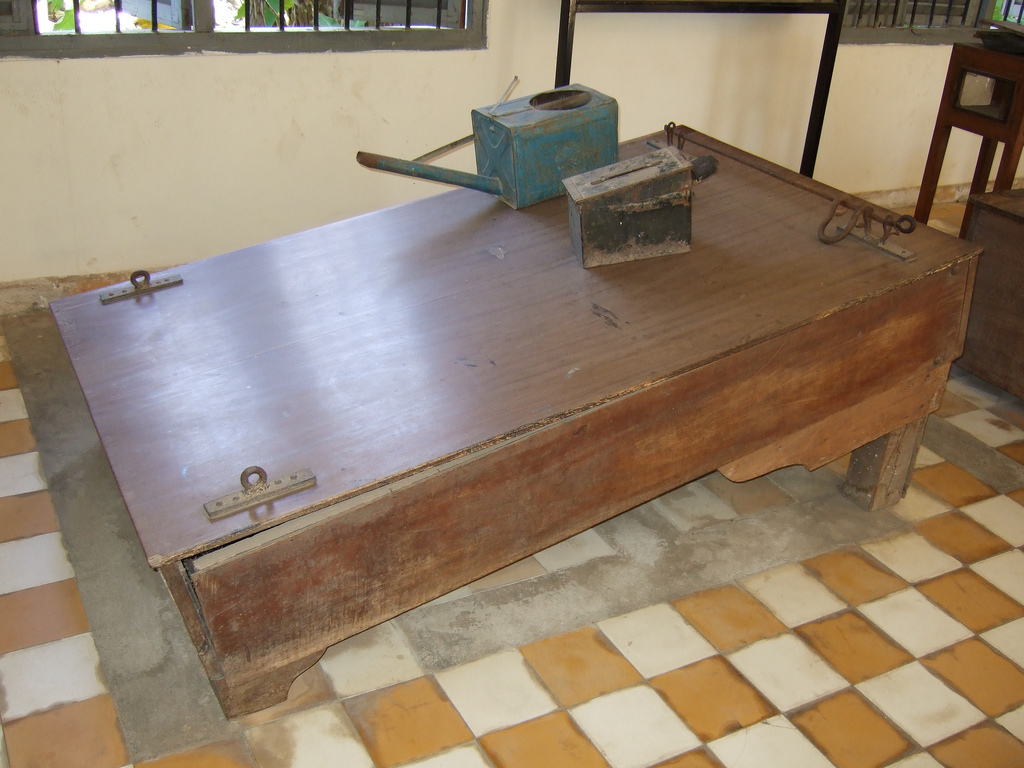
Waterboard on display at the Tuol Sleng Genocide Museum: prisoners' feet were shackled to the bar on the right, wrists restrained by shackles on the left. Water was poured over the face using the watering can. The use of this type of waterboard is depicted in a painting by former Tuol Sleng prisoner Vann Nath, shown in that article.

The Khmer Rouge at the Tuol Sleng prison in Phnom Penh, Cambodia, used waterboarding as a method of torture between 1975 and 1979. The local variation of waterboarding was perfected by Duch's lieutenants Mam Nai and Tang Sin Hean and documented in a painting by former inmate Vann Nath, which is on display in the Tuol Sleng Genocide Museum. The museum also has on display boards and other actual tools used for waterboarding during the Khmer Rouge regime.

=== Northern Ireland ===
During the Troubles, an ethno-nationalist conflict in Northern Ireland, there were instances of British security forces, including the British Army and the Royal Ulster Constabulary (RUC) waterboarding suspected Irish Republican Army (IRA) members. Former RUC interrogators who were active during the Troubles claimed that waterboarding, among other forms of torture, were systematically used against suspected IRA members in police custody. In October 1972, Liam Holden was arrested by members of the Parachute Regiment on the suspicion of being an IRA sniper who had killed a British paratrooper, Frank Bell. He was convicted the next year of the crime and sentenced to be executed, largely on the basis of an unsigned confession produced by a range of torture techniques, including waterboarding. Holden's death sentence was commuted to life imprisonment and he spent 17 years in prison. On 21 June 2012, in the light of CCRC investigations which confirmed that the methods used to extract a confession from Holden were unlawful, he had his conviction quashed by the Court of Appeal in Belfast and was cleared of murder.

=== Apartheid in the Union of South Africa ===
The South African Truth and Reconciliation Commission received testimony from Charles Zeelie and Jeffrey Benzien, officers of the South African Police under Apartheid, that they used waterboarding, referred to as "tubing", or the "wet bag technique" on political prisoners as part of a wide range of torture methods to extract information. Specifically, a cloth bag was wet and placed over victim's heads, to be removed only when they were near asphyxiation; the procedure was repeated several times. The TRC concluded that the act constituted torture and a gross human rights violation, for which the state was responsible.

=== U.S. military survival training ===
Until 2007, all special operations units in all branches of the U.S. military and the CIA's Special Activities Division employed the use of waterboarding as part of survival school (Survival, Evasion, Resistance and Escape) training, to psychologically prepare soldiers for the possibility of being captured by enemy forces. By 2002, many branches of the military had backed away from waterboarding trainees, at least in part "because it hurt morale", and in November 2007 the practice was banned by the Department of Defense because it "provided no instructional or training benefit to the student". John Yoo, former deputy assistant attorney general under President Bush stated that the United States has subjected 20,000 of its troops to waterboarding as part of SERE training prior to deployment to Iraq and Afghanistan. Dr. Jerald Ogrisseg, former head of Psychological Services for the Air Force SERE School has stated in testimony before the U.S. Senate's Committee on Armed Services that there are fundamental differences between SERE training and what occurs in real-world settings. Dr. Ogrisseg further states that his experience is limited to SERE training, but that he did not believe waterboarding to be productive in either setting.

Jane Mayer wrote for The New Yorker:

According to the SERE affiliate and two other sources familiar with the program, after September 11th several psychologists versed in SERE techniques began advising interrogators at Guantánamo Bay and elsewhere. Some of these psychologists essentially "tried to reverse-engineer" the SERE program, as the affiliate put it. "They took good knowledge and used it in a bad way", another of the sources said. Interrogators and BSCT members at Guantánamo adopted coercive techniques similar to those employed in the SERE program.

and continues to report:

many of the interrogation methods used in SERE training seem to have been applied at Guantánamo.

However, according to a declassified Justice Department memo attempting to justify torture which references a still-classified report of the CIA Inspector General on the CIA's use of waterboarding, among other "enhanced" interrogation techniques, the CIA applied waterboarding to detainees "in a different manner" than the technique used in SERE training:

The difference was in the manner in which the detainees' breathing was obstructed. At the SERE school and in the DoJ opinion, the subject's airflow is disrupted by the firm application of a damp cloth over the air passages; the interrogator applies a small amount of water to the cloth in a controlled manner. By contrast, the Agency interrogator ... applied large volumes of water to a cloth that covered the detainee's mouth and nose. One of the psychiatrist / interrogators acknowledged that the Agency's use of the technique is different from that used in SERE training because it is 'for real' and is more poignant and convincing.

According to the DOJ memo, the IG Report observed that the CIA's Office of Medical Services (OMS) stated that "the experience of the SERE psychologist / interrogators on the waterboard was probably misrepresented at the time, as the SERE waterboard experience is so different from the subsequent Agency usage as to make it almost irrelevant" and that "[c]onsequently, according to OMS, there was no a priori reason to believe that applying the waterboard with the frequency and intensity with which it was used by the psychologist/interrogators was either efficacious or medically safe."

== Contemporary use ==
=== United States ===
==== Use by law enforcement ====
In 1983, San Jacinto County, Texas sheriff, James Parker, and three of his deputies were convicted for conspiring to force confessions. The complaint said they "subject prisoners to a suffocating water torture ordeal to coerce confessions. This generally included the placement of a towel over the nose and mouth of the prisoner and the pouring of water into the towel until the prisoner began to move, jerk (twitch), or otherwise indicate suffocation and/or drowning." James Parker was sentenced to ten years in prison, and the deputies to four years.

==== Use by intelligence officers ====
The 21 June 2004 issue of Newsweek stated that the Bybee Memo, an early August 2002 legal memorandum drafted by John Yoo and signed by his boss, Jay S. Bybee, then head of the Office of Legal Counsel, described interrogation tactics against suspected terrorists or terrorist affiliates the George W. Bush administration would consider legal, was "prompted by CIA questions about what to do with a top Qaeda captive, Abu Zubaydah, who had turned uncooperative... and was drafted after White House meetings convened by George W. Bush's chief counsel, Alberto Gonzales, along with Defense Department general counsel William Haynes and David Addington, Vice President Dick Cheney's counsel, who discussed specific interrogation techniques", citing "a source familiar with the discussions". Amongst the methods they found acceptable was waterboarding. Jack Goldsmith, head of the Office of Legal Counsel (October 2003-June 2004) in the Department of Justice, later said this group was known as "the war council".

In November 2005, ABC News reported that former CIA agents claimed that the CIA engaged in a modern form of waterboarding, along with five other "enhanced interrogation techniques", against suspected members of al Qaeda.

On 20 July 2007, U.S. President George W. Bush signed Executive Order 13440, banning torture during interrogation of terror suspects. While the guidelines for interrogation do not specifically ban waterboarding, the executive order refers to torture as defined by 18 USC 2340, which includes "the threat of imminent death", as well as the U.S. Constitution's ban on cruel and unusual punishment. Reaction to the order was mixed, with the CIA satisfied that it "clearly defined" the agency's authorities.

Human Rights Watch said that answers about what specific techniques had been banned lay in the classified companion document and that "the people in charge of interpreting [that] document don't have a particularly good track record of reasonable legal analysis".

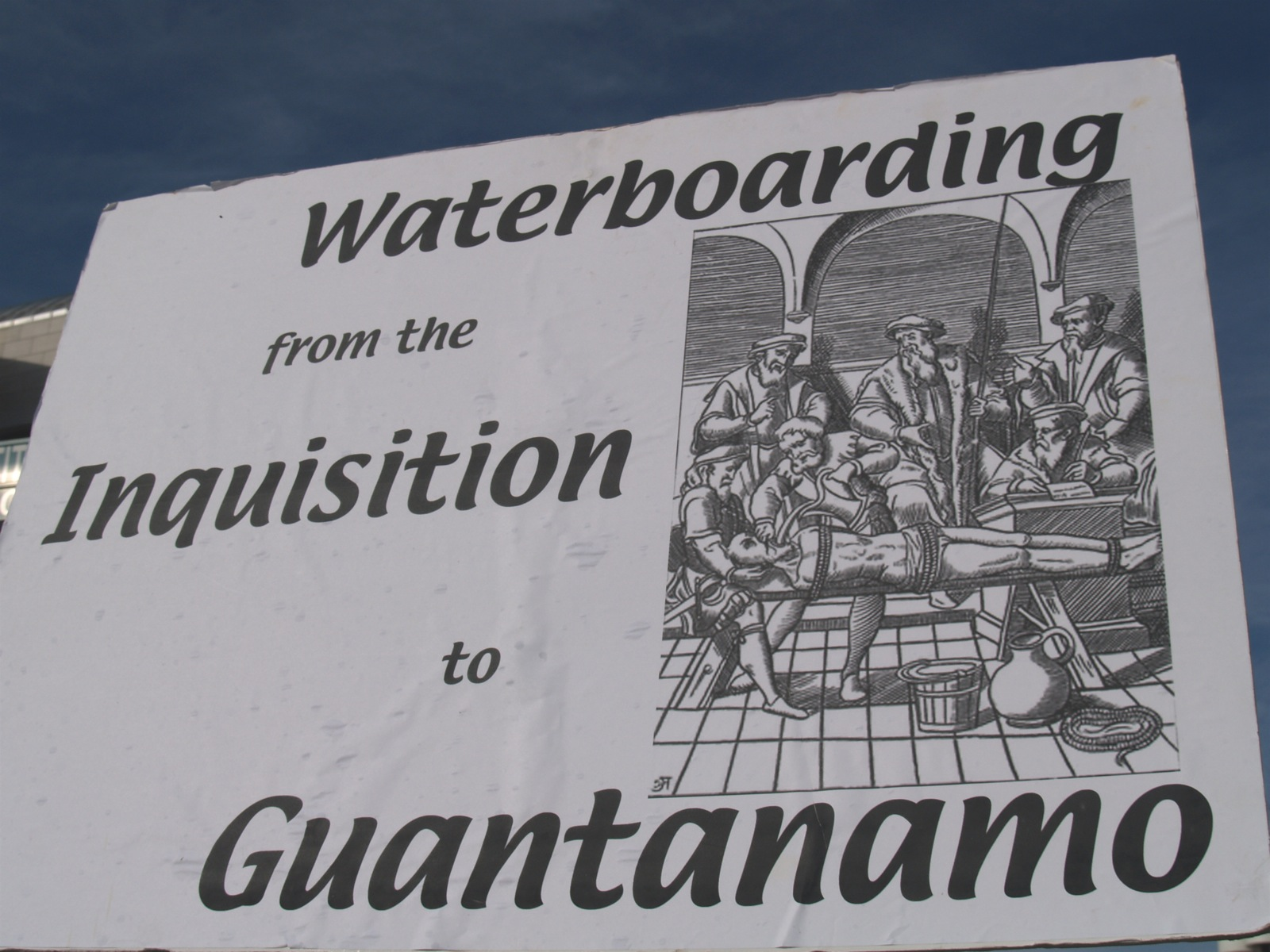
Photo from a protest against waterboarding

On 14 September 2007, ABC News reported that sometime in 2006, CIA Director Michael Hayden asked for and received permission from the Bush administration to ban the use of waterboarding in CIA interrogations. A CIA spokesperson declined to discuss interrogation techniques, stating the techniques "have been and continue to be lawful". ABC reported that waterboarding had been authorized by a 2002 Presidential finding. On 5 November 2007, The Wall Street Journal reported that its "sources confirm... that the CIA has only used this interrogation method against three terrorist detainees and not since 2003." John Kiriakou, a former CIA officer, is the first official within the U.S. government to openly admit to the use of waterboarding as an interrogation technique, as of 10 December 2007.

On 6 February 2008, CIA director General Michael Hayden stated that the CIA had waterboarded three prisoners during 2002 and 2003, namely Abu Zubaydah, Khalid Sheikh Mohammed, and Abd al-Rahim al-Nashiri.

On 23 February 2008, the Justice Department revealed that its internal ethics office was investigating the department's legal approval for waterboarding of al Qaeda suspects by the CIA and was likely to make public an unclassified version of its report.

On 15 October 2008, it was reported that the Bush administration had issued a pair of secret memos to the CIA in June 2003 and June 2004 explicitly endorsing waterboarding and other torture techniques against al-Qaeda suspects. The memos were granted only after "repeated requests" from the CIA, who at the time were worried that the White House would eventually try to distance themselves from the issue. Field employees in the agency believed they could easily be blamed for using the techniques without proper written permission or authority. Until this point, the Bush administration had never been concretely tied to acknowledging the torture practices.

In December 2008, Robert Mueller, the Director of the FBI since 5 July 2001, had said that despite Bush Administration claims that waterboarding has "disrupted a number of attacks, maybe dozens of attacks", he does not believe that evidence obtained by the U.S. government through enhanced interrogation techniques such as waterboarding disrupted one attack.

In an interview in January 2009, Dick Cheney acknowledged the use of waterboarding to interrogate suspects and said that waterboarding had been "used with great discrimination by people who know what they're doing and has produced a lot of valuable information and intelligence".

On 1 July 2009, the Obama administration announced that it was delaying the scheduled release of declassified portions of a report by the CIA Inspector General in response to a civil lawsuit. The CIA report reportedly cast doubt on the effectiveness of the torture used by CIA interrogators during the Bush administration. This was based on several George W. Bush-era Justice Department memos declassified in the Spring of 2009 by the U.S. Justice Department.

===== Abu Zubaydah =====
Abu Zubaydah was waterboarded by the CIA. He was detained in a 'black site' prison in Thailand. Here, the CIA waterboarded him 83 times in a month. CIA operative also slammed his head against walls, deprived him of sleep, and kept him in a box.

In 2002, U.S. intelligence located Abu Zubaydah by tracing his phone calls. He was captured 28 March 2002, in a safehouse located in a two-story apartment in Faisalabad, Pakistan.

One of Abu Zubaydah's FBI interrogators, Ali Soufan, wrote a book about his experiences. He later testified to Congress that Zubaydah was producing useful information in response to conventional interrogation methods, including the names of Sheikh Mohammed and Jose Padilla. He stopped providing accurate information in response to harsh techniques. Soufan, one of the FBI's most successful interrogators, explained, "When they are in pain, people will say anything to get the pain to stop. Most of the time, they will lie, make up anything to make you stop hurting them. That means the information you're getting is useless."

Participating in his later interrogation by the CIA were two American psychologists, James Elmer Mitchell and R. Scott Shumate.

In December 2007, The Washington Post reported that there were some discrepancies regarding reports about the number of times Zubaydah was waterboarded. According to a previous account by former CIA officer John Kiriakou, Abu Zubaydah broke after just 35 seconds of waterboarding, which involved stretching cellophane over his mouth and nose and pouring water on his face to create the sensation of drowning. Kiriakou later admitted that he had no first hand knowledge of the interrogation and accused the CIA of using him to spread disinformation. In 2007, Kiriakou had told CNN's "American Morning" that the waterboarding of Al Qaeda's Abu Zubaydah indirectly led to the arrest of Khalid Sheikh Mohammed.

===== Khalid Sheikh Mohammed =====
Khalid Sheikh Mohammed was waterboarded 183 times while being interrogated by the CIA.

Pakistani intelligence agents say Mohammed was carrying a letter from bin Laden at the time of his arrest, but there is no evidence he knew bin Laden's whereabouts. By this point, any information Mohammed had would have been years out of date.

After being subjected to repeated waterboarding, Mohammed claimed participation in thirty-one terrorist plots. On 15 June 2009, in response to a lawsuit by the ACLU, the government was forced to disclose a previously classified portion of a CIA memo written in 2006. It recounted Mohammed's telling the CIA that he "made up stories" to stop from being tortured. Legal experts cast serious doubt as to the validity of Mohammed's "confessions" as being false claims, and human rights activists raised serious concerns over the "sham process" of justice and use of torture.

During a radio interview on 24 October 2006, with Scott Hennen of radio station WDAY, Vice President Dick Cheney agreed with the use of waterboarding. The administration later denied that Cheney had confirmed the use of waterboarding, saying that U.S. officials do not talk publicly about interrogation techniques because they are classified. White House Press Secretary Tony Snow claimed that Cheney was not referring to waterboarding, despite repeated questions refused to specify what else Cheney was referring to by a "dunk in the water", and refused to confirm that this meant waterboarding.

On 13 September 2007, ABC News reported that a former intelligence officer stated that Khalid Sheikh Mohammed had been waterboarded in the presence of a female CIA supervisor.

On 2 June 2010, while speaking to the Economic Club of Grand Rapids, Michigan, former President Bush publicly confirmed his knowledge and approval of waterboarding Mohammed, saying "Yeah, we waterboarded Khalid Sheikh Mohammed...I'd do it again to save lives."

==== Obama administration ====
President Barack Obama banned the use of waterboarding and several other interrogation methods in January 2009. He reported that U.S. personnel must stick to the Army Field Manual guidelines. In early April 2009, the Obama administration released several classified Justice Department memos from the George W. Bush administration that discussed waterboarding.

Obama opposed prosecuting CIA personnel who committed waterboarding while relying on legal advice provided by their superiors. The American Civil Liberties Union has criticized his stance. In early April 2009, news reports stated that Obama would support an independent investigation over the issue as long as it would be bipartisan. On 23 April 2009, White House Press Secretary Robert Gibbs stated that the administration had changed its position and no longer supported such an idea. The topic was the subject of heated internal debate within the White House.

National Intelligence Director Dennis Blair has stated that "high value information" came from waterboarding certain prisoners during the George W. Bush administration. He also commented that he could not know for sure whether or not other interrogation methods would have caused them to talk, had they been tried. In an administration memo that was publicly released, he wrote, "I do not fault those who made the decisions at that time, and I will absolutely defend those who carried out the interrogations within the orders they were given."

An April poll by Rasmussen Reports found that 77 percent of voters had followed the story in the media and that 58 percent believed that releasing the memos compromised American national security. On the issue of a further investigation, 58 percent disagreed while 28% agreed.

Obama detailed his view on waterboarding and torture in a press conference on 29 April 2009.

In May 2011, Obama authorized a successful commando raid to kill Osama Bin Laden. The extent to which waterboarding assisted in ascertaining the whereabouts of Bin Laden is a matter of dispute. Former Attorney General Michael Mukasey criticized the Obama administration for denying future missions the intelligence capability that made the raid possible: "Acknowledging and meeting the need for an effective and lawful interrogation program, which we once had, and freeing CIA operatives and others to administer it under congressional oversight, would be a fitting way to mark the demise of Osama bin Laden." CIA Director Leon Panetta, who supervised the operation that found and killed bin Laden, stated in an interview with NBC reporter Brian Williams: "...they used these enhanced interrogation techniques against some of these detainees. But I'm also saying, that the debate about whether we would have gotten the same information through other approaches, I think, is always going to be an open question."

Republican Senator John McCain, in a The Washington Post opinion piece, disputed Mukasey's account, saying:

I asked CIA Director Leon Panetta for the facts, and he told me the following: The trail to bin Laden did not begin with a disclosure from Khalid Sheik Mohammed, who was waterboarded 183 times. The first mention of Abu Ahmed al-Kuwaiti — the nickname of the al-Qaeda courier who ultimately led us to bin Laden — as well as a description of him as an important member of al-Qaeda, came from a detainee held in another country, who we believe was not tortured. None of the three detainees who were waterboarded provided Abu Ahmed's real name, his whereabouts or an accurate description of his role in al-Qaeda. In fact, the use of 'enhanced interrogation techniques' on Khalid Sheik Mohammed produced false and misleading information. He specifically told his interrogators that Abu Ahmed had moved to Peshawar, got married and ceased his role as an al-Qaeda facilitator — none of which was true. According to the staff of the Senate intelligence committee, the best intelligence gained from a CIA detainee — information describing Abu Ahmed al-Kuwaiti's real role in al-Qaeda and his true relationship to bin Laden — was obtained through standard, noncoercive means.

In December 2014, the Senate Select Committee on Intelligence issued a declassified 500-page summary of its still-classified 6,700 page report on the Central Intelligence Agency (CIA) Detention and Interrogation Program. The report concluded that "the CIA's use of Enhanced Interrogation Techniques (EIT) was not effective for acquiring intelligence or gaining cooperation from detainees." According to the report, the CIA had presented no credible proof that information obtained through waterboarding or the other harsh interrogation methods that the CIA employed prevented any attacks or saved any lives. There was no evidence that information obtained from the detainees through EIT was not or could not have been obtained through conventional interrogation methods. The Committee examined in detail the specific question of whether torture had elicited information helpful in locating Osama Bin Laden, concluded that it had not, and further concluded that the CIA deliberately misled political leaders and the public in claiming otherwise.

U.S. Attorney General Eric H. Holder Jr. announced on 30 August 2012 that no one would be prosecuted for the deaths of a prisoner in Afghanistan in 2002 and another in Iraq in 2003, eliminating the last possibility that any criminal charges will be brought as a result of the interrogations carried out by the CIA. The Justice Department closed its investigation of the CIA's use of severe interrogation methods, because investigators said they could not prove any agents crossed the lines authorized by the Bush administration in the "war on terror" program of detention and rendition. According to the New York Times the closing of the two cases means that the Obama administration's limited effort to scrutinize the counterterrorism programs, such as waterboarding, carried out under President George W. Bush has come to an end.

==== Before and during the 2016 presidential election ====
In 2015, various Republican presidential candidates indicated their willingness to bring back waterboarding as an interrogation technique. Donald Trump (the eventual winner of the election) stated he believed in the effectiveness of the technique. Trump also stated that it is a "minimal" form of torture, and that it was necessary. Ben Carson had not ruled out approving its use, nor did Jeb Bush. Carly Fiorina endorsed its use, as did Rick Perry and Rick Santorum.

In June 2015, in response to a critical assessment of China in the U.S. State Department's annual human rights report, China noted that the U.S., among other alleged human rights abuses, had engaged in torture of terrorism suspects by waterboarding.

=== Islamic State of Iraq and Syria ===
In October 2014, John Cantlie reported that ISIS had waterboarded prisoners, "Some of us who tried to escape were waterboarded by our captors, as Muslim prisoners are waterboarded by their American captors."

=== China ===
Waterboarding is reported to be among the forms of torture used as part of the indoctrination process at the Xinjiang re-education camps.

== Effectiveness ==
Waterboarding and other forms of water torture have historically been used for 1) punishing, 2) forcing confessions for use in trials, 3) eliciting false confessions for political purposes, and 4) obtaining factual intelligence for military purposes.

=== For eliciting confessions ===
Its use principally for obtaining confessions rather than as punishment dates back to the 15th century and the Spanish Inquisition. It was also in use for the same purpose, albeit illegally, by U.S. police officers as recently as 1981.

During the Korean War, the North Koreans used several methods of torture to achieve prisoner compliance and false confessions. According to Washington Post writer Walter Pincus, such techniques caused U.S. airmen to falsely "confess" that there was a plan to use biological weapons against North Korea.

After the September 11 attacks, CIA interrogators sought to waterboard suspected terrorists to obtain actionable intelligence, but prisoners falsely confessed to whatever interrogators accused them of in order to stop the torture. Khalid Shaykh Muhammad fabricated stories to give his tormentors "everything they wanted to hear." Later, he recanted, citing he was being tortured when he made up the stories. The same was true for the "confessions" forced by the torture on Riduan Isamuddin, aka Hambali.

=== For obtaining actionable intelligence ===
There is no evidence that waterboarding reliably produces truthful, useful intelligence. In May 2003, a senior CIA interrogator told the CIA's Office of Inspector General that the torture then being used by the CIA was modeled after U.S. resistance training to prepare servicemen for "physical torture" by North Vietnamese. This torture, including waterboarding, was intended to extract "confessions for propaganda purposes" from U.S. airmen "who possessed little actionable intelligence." If the CIA wanted to obtain useful information rather than false confessions, he said, the CIA needed "a different working model for interrogating terrorists."

Nonetheless, with the active support of former Vice President Dick Cheney, the CIA embraced the torture approach proposed by two psychologists, James Elmer Mitchell and Bruce Jessen, neither of whom had interrogation experience. While Cheney continues to maintain that waterboarding has "produced phenomenal results" including tracking down Osama bin Laden, the report of the Senate Select Committee on Intelligence concluded that "the CIA's use of its enhanced interrogation techniques was not an effective means of acquiring intelligence or gaining cooperation from detainees." There was no proof, according to the 6,700-page report, that information obtained through waterboarding prevented any attacks or saved any lives, or that information obtained from the detainees was not or could not have been obtained through conventional interrogation methods.

== Legality ==
=== International law ===
All nations that are signatory to the United Nations Convention Against Torture have agreed they are subject to the explicit prohibition on torture under any condition. This was affirmed by Saadi v. Italy in which the European Court of Human Rights, on 28 February 2008, upheld the absolute nature of the torture ban by ruling that international law permits no exceptions to it. Article 2.2 of the Convention Against Torture states that "[n]o exceptional circumstances whatsoever, whether a state of war or a threat of war, internal political instability or any other public emergency, may be invoked as a justification of torture." Additionally, signatories of the Universal Declaration of Human Rights are bound to Article 5, which states, "No one shall be subjected to torture or to cruel, inhuman or degrading treatment or punishment." Many signatories of the UN Convention Against Torture have made specific declarations and reservations regarding the interpretation of the term "torture" and restricted the jurisdiction of its enforcement. However, UN High Commissioner for Human Rights, Louise Arbour, stated on the subject "I would have no problems with describing this practice as falling under the prohibition of torture", and that violators of the UN Convention Against Torture should be prosecuted under the principle of universal jurisdiction.

Bent Sørensen, Senior Medical Consultant to the International Rehabilitation Council for Torture Victims and former member of the United Nations Committee Against Torture has said:

It's a clear-cut case: Waterboarding can without any reservation be labeled as torture. It fulfils all of the four central criteria that according to the United Nations Convention Against Torture (UNCAT) defines an act of torture. First, when water is forced into your lungs in this fashion, in addition to the pain you are likely to experience an immediate and extreme fear of death. You may even suffer a heart attack from the stress or damage to the lungs and brain from inhalation of water and oxygen deprivation. In other words there is no doubt that waterboarding causes severe physical and/or mental suffering– one central element in the UNCAT's definition of torture. In addition the CIA's waterboarding clearly fulfills the three additional definition criteria stated in the Convention for a deed to be labeled torture, since it is 1) done intentionally, 2) for a specific purpose and 3) by a representative of a state– in this case the US.

Lieutenant General Michael D. Maples, the director of the Defense Intelligence Agency, concurred by stating, in a hearing before the Senate Armed Services Committee, that he believes waterboarding violates Common Article 3 of the Geneva Conventions.

In a review of The Dark Side: The Inside Story of How the War on Terror Turned Into a War on American Ideals, by Jane Mayer, The New York Times reported on 11 July 2008, that "Red Cross investigators concluded last year in a secret report that the Central Intelligence Agency's interrogation methods for high-level Qaeda prisoners constituted torture and could make the Bush administration officials who approved them guilty of war crimes", that the techniques applied to Abu Zubaydah were "categorically" torture, and that Abu Zubaydah had told investigators that, contrary to what had been revealed previously, "he had been waterboarded at least 10 times in a single week and as many as three times in a day".

Shortly before the end of Bush's second term, news media in other countries were opining that under the United Nations Convention Against Torture, the U.S. is obligated to hold those responsible to account under criminal law.

On 20 January 2009, Manfred Nowak—the United Nations Special Rapporteur on torture and other cruel, inhuman or degrading treatment or punishment—stated that following the inauguration of Barack Obama as president of the United States, George W. Bush had lost his head of state immunity; Nowak opined that under international law, the U.S. was mandated to start criminal proceedings against all those involved in violations of the UN Convention Against Torture. Law professor Dietmar Herz asserted that under U.S. and international law, Bush was criminally responsible for adopting torture as interrogation tool.

=== United States law and regulations ===
The United States Supreme Court in Sosa v. Alvarez-Machain, said that the Universal Declaration of Human Rights "does not of its own force impose obligations as a matter of international law." However, the United States has a historical record of regarding waterboarding as a war crime, and has prosecuted individuals for such practice in the past.

In 1947, during the Yokohama War Crimes Trials, the United States prosecuted a Japanese civilian who had served in World War II as an interpreter for the Japanese military, Yukio Asano, for "Violation of the Laws and Customs of War", asserting that he "did unlawfully take and convert to his own use Red Cross packages and supplies intended for" prisoners, but, far worse, that he also "did willfully and unlawfully mistreat and torture" prisoners of war. The charges against Asano included "beating using hands, fists, club; kicking; water torture; burning using cigarettes; strapping on a stretcher head downward." The specifications in the charges with regard to "water torture" consisted of "pouring water up [the] nostrils" of one prisoner, "forcing water into [the] mouths and noses" of two other prisoners, and "forcing water into [the] nose" of a fourth prisoner. Asano received a sentence of 15 years of hard labor.

Following the September 11 attacks, several memoranda, including the Bybee memo, were written analyzing the legal position and possibilities in the treatment of prisoners. The memos, known today as the "torture memos", advocate enhanced interrogation techniques, while pointing out that refuting the Geneva Conventions would reduce the possibility of prosecution for war crimes. In addition, a new definition of torture was issued. Most actions that fall under the international definition do not fall within this new definition advocated by the U.S.

In its 2005 Country Reports on Human Rights Practices, the U.S. Department of State formally recognized "submersion of the head in water" as torture in its examination of Tunisia's poor human rights record, and draws parallels between the two techniques, citing the similar usage of water on the subject.

On 6 September 2006, the U.S. Department of Defense released a revised Army Field Manual entitled Human Intelligence Collector Operations that prohibits the use of waterboarding by U.S. military personnel. The department adopted the manual amid widespread criticism of U.S. handling of prisoners in the war on terrorism, and prohibits other practices in addition to waterboarding. The revised manual applies only to U.S. military personnel, and as such does not apply to the practices of the CIA. Nevertheless, Steven G. Bradbury, acting head of the U.S. Department of Justice (DOJ) Office of Legal Counsel, on 14 February 2008 testified:

There has been no determination by the Justice Department that the use of waterboarding, under any circumstances, would be lawful under current law.

In addition, both under the War Crimes Act and international law, violators of the laws of war are criminally liable under the command responsibility doctrine, and they could still be prosecuted for war crimes. Commenting on the torture memos, Scott Horton pointed out:

the possibility that the authors of these memoranda counseled the use of lethal and unlawful techniques, and therefore face criminal culpability themselves. That, after all, is the teaching of United States v. Altstötter, the Nuremberg case brought against German Justice Department lawyers whose memoranda crafted the basis for implementation of the infamous "Night and Fog Decree".

Michael Mukasey's refusal to investigate and prosecute anyone that relied on these legal opinions led Jordan Paust of the University of Houston Law Center to write an article for JURIST stating:

it is legally and morally impossible for any member of the executive branch to be acting lawfully or within the scope of his or her authority while following OLC opinions that are manifestly inconsistent with or violative of the law. General Mukasey, just following orders is no defense!

On 22 February 2008, Senator Sheldon Whitehouse made public that "the Justice Department has announced it has launched an investigation of the role of top DOJ officials and staff attorneys in authorizing and/or overseeing the use of waterboarding by U.S. intelligence agencies."

Both houses of the United States Congress approved a bill by February 2008 that would ban waterboarding and other harsh interrogation methods, the Intelligence Authorization Act for Fiscal Year 2008. As he promised, President Bush vetoed the legislation on 8 March. His veto applied to the authorization for the entire intelligence budget for the 2008 fiscal year, but he cited the waterboarding ban as the reason for the veto. Supporters of the bill lacked enough votes to overturn the veto.

On 22 January 2009, President Barack Obama signed Executive Order 13491, which requires both U.S. military and paramilitary organizations to use the Army Field Manual as the guide on getting information from prisoners, moving away from the Bush administration tactics.

== Images of waterboarding in use ==
While waterboarding has been depicted in several films and demonstrated at protest gatherings, images of its actual use are scarce. The CIA allegedly destroyed all videos it made of the procedure. The 1968 Washington Post photo of a captured North Vietnamese soldier being interrogated is arguably different because instead of being strapped to a board, the prisoner is held down by two soldiers as a third pours water from a canteen over a cloth covering face. One eyewitness depiction of waterboarding is a painting by Vann Nath, a Cambodian artist who was held captive and tortured by the Khmer Rouge. After his release in 1979 from Tuol Sleng Prison, he began to paint pictures of the abusive practices used there, including waterboarding, to let people know about them, saying of the prisoners he heard screaming for help: "I would like their souls to get something from what I paint." One of his waterboarding paintings depicts a sparse room with a man affixed to a board by iron bars. A cloth covers his head. Another man pours water from a watering can over his face. A similar board and watering can are on display at the Tuol Sleng Genocide Museum.

In 2008, the Coney Island waterboarding thrill ride went on display in Coney Island amusement park: viewers would see two models, one a captive wearing an orange uniform who was spread-eagled on a tilted table, the other one a masked interrogator. When viewers inserted a dollar the interrogator figure would pour water onto a rag over the captive figures' nose and throat, upon which the captive figure would start convulsing.

== See also ==
- At the Center of the Storm: My Years at the CIA
- Command responsibility
- Department of Defense Directive 2310
- Dunking
- Senate Intelligence Committee report on CIA torture
- Torture in the United States

== Sources ==
- Cox, Rory (2018). "Historicizing waterboarding as a severe torture norm". International Relations. 32 (4): 488–512. doi:10.1177/0047117818774396. hdl:10023/16068. S2CID 150350366.
- Hassner, Ron E. (2020). "What Do We Know about Interrogational Torture?". International Journal of Intelligence and CounterIntelligence. 33 (1): 4–42. doi:10.1080/08850607.2019.1660951.
