= Martin Maher =

Martin Maher may refer to:

- Martin Maher (soldier) (1876–1961), American soldier and subject of the 1955 film The Long Gray Line
- Martin Maher (parks commissioner), Brooklyn parks commissioner, New York City

== See also ==
- Martin Maier (1840–1893), American soldier and businessman
- Martin Mayer (1928–2019), American author
