= Coney Island waterboarding thrill ride =

2008 artwork

Exterior of the animatronic depiction of waterboarding from Coney Island.

The Coney Island waterboarding thrill ride was a work in Coney Island, Brooklyn, New York City conceived by conceptual artist Steve Powers in mid-2008.

As originally conceived, Powers saw the public watching volunteers undergoing actual waterboarding. The Washington Post reported that on August 17, 2008, Powers brought in Mike Ritz, a former US official experienced in administering waterboarding, for a one time demonstration of waterboarding on volunteers. This demonstration was not open to the general public, but rather for an invited audience. Powers himself was one of the volunteers.

As built, the thrill ride was a diorama, where viewers would mount stairs to a window where they would see a tableau of two robotic models, one a captive, one a masked interrogator. The captive was wearing an orange uniform "non-compliant" captives wear in the United States' Guantanamo Bay detention camps, in Cuba, and was spread-eagled on a tilted table.

When the piece was installed, in July 2008, viewers inserted a dollar and the interrogator figure would pour water onto a rag over the captive figures' nose and throat, upon which the captive figure would start convulsing.

The piece was installed in a row of ordinary Coney Island freak shows and concessions. When installed the thrill ride triggered coverage and commentary around the world.

The installation's last viewing was on September 14, 2008.

Powers told The New York Times his purpose in preparing the display was educational, being "a way of exploring the issue without doing any harm". He said of the work:

What's more obscene, the official position that waterboarding is not torture, or our official position that it's a thrill ride? [...] It's the perfect Coney Island distraction — it's not quite delivering what it offers, but it's putting a unique experience on the table. And it doesn't take a great leap of the imagination to look in there and say: 'That's really what's going on? That's crazy.'"
