= Liam Holden =

Last person sentenced to death in Northern Ireland (1953–2022)

- Born: 1953
- Died: 15 September 2022 (aged 68)

Liam Holden (1953 – 15 September 2022) was an Irish man who, in 1973 at the age of 19, was sentenced to death by hanging following his conviction for killing a British soldier in Northern Ireland. He was the last person sentenced to death in the UK, as Northern Ireland maintained the death penalty following its abolition in Great Britain in 1965. There were, however, cases in the Channel Islands and the Isle of Man where death sentences were issued after this date, the last against Anthony Teare. As no one had been executed in Northern Ireland since Robert McGladdery in 1961, it was held unlikely that the sentence would be carried out.

In July 1973, the British Secretary of State for Northern Ireland, William Whitelaw, commuted Holden's sentence to life imprisonment. He was released in 1989.

In 2002, Holden brought his conviction to the Criminal Cases Review Commission (CCRC) which investigates miscarriages of justice in Northern Ireland. He gave detailed testimony of being subjected to a wide range of torture techniques, including waterboarding, following his interrogation (with his brother, Patrick) in October 1972 regarding the killing of British Parachute Regiment soldier Private Frank Bell on 17 September 1972.

On 21 June 2012, in the light of the CCRC investigation, which confirmed that the methods used to extract confessions were unlawful, the conviction was quashed by the Court of Appeal in Belfast, when Holden was 58 years old.

== Background ==
At the time of his arrest in October 1972 Holden lived in the staunchly republican Ballymurphy area of Belfast. Many people in his community had been arrested; stories of mistreatment and torture during these arrests bore a similarity to each other. The government of Ireland initiated proceedings in the European Court of Human Rights, the judicial body established by the Council of Europe to hear claims under the European Convention on Human Rights (ECHR), on behalf of a sample number of internees against the government of the United Kingdom, claiming that their human rights were being breached under Article 3 of the ECHR, which outlawed torture and cruel and degrading treatment.

It was shown that the military had adopted an interrogation policy known as "the five techniques" that breached Article 3. The European Commission on Human Rights, when it finally heard the case in 1978, concluded that this policy constituted 'torture' of prisoners under Article 3 of the European Commission on Human Rights, while the European Court of Human Rights concluded the policy constituted "cruel, inhuman and degrading" treatment of internees.

More people died in 1972 than during any other year of "The Troubles". There were 467 conflict-related deaths, 1800 explosions and more than 10,000 shooting incidents that year. Bell's death made him the 100th British soldier to have been killed in Northern Ireland in 1972.

== Arrest and interrogation ==
Holden was employed as a chef. Shortly before 1 am roughly a month after Bell's killing, he was arrested at his parents' home in Ballymurphy by members of the British Army's Parachute Regiment, which claimed to be acting upon a tip-off that Holden had been the PIRA sniper who killed Bell. Holden's brother, Patrick, was taken by the Parachute Regiment at the same time.

The brothers were told they were being detained as suspected IRA members and were driven away in a Saracen armoured car. However, rather than being driven to a police station or regular British Army barracks they were driven to the nearby Black Mountain primary school.

The Guardian journalist Ian Cobain, whose research did much to highlight the Holden case, noted the British Army had chosen the school as a useful base from which to patrol the area, remarking "No doubt one consideration [for choosing a school] was that soldiers inside the grounds were unlikely to attract too much incoming fire from Republican strongholds nearby – at least during the school day." In the school the Holden brothers were interned in a portable building which was home to 1 Para's intelligence section. It had around eight small cubicles without doors, with each brother being taken to a separate cubicle. In the cubicle between them was a tape recorder playing loud music. Patrick Holden was released after an hour.

Holden testified that "six soldiers came into the cubicle where I was being held and grabbed me. They held me down on the floor and one of them placed a towel over my face, and they got water and they started pouring the water through the towel all round my face, very slowly. After a while you can't get your breath but you still try to get your breath, so when you were trying to breathe in through your mouth you are sucking the water in, and if you try to breathe in through your nose, you are sniffing the water in. It was continual, a slow process, and at the end of it you basically feel like you are suffocating."

Five hours later, when the ordeal was almost at an end, a captain from the Royal Army Medical Corps was brought in to examine him. This individual recorded that there were "no injuries ... no bruising anywhere". As Holden's legal team demonstrated, his arrest alone was illegal under British law at the time on several counts. First, according to the 'Blue Card' rules given to all British soldiers at the time, a suspect cannot be questioned at army posts. Second, if a suspect is arrested by military he or she must immediately be handed over to police at the earliest opportunity. Third, suspects must not be questioned by military personnel once detained.

== Trial and release ==
Liam Holden, in his 1973 testimony, said that after the interrogation he was taken from the school and driven to the outskirts of Belfast, where a gun was put to his head and he was told to sign a confession. A military police sergeant drove Holden to Castlereagh police station in east Belfast. There, Holden signed a statement admitting shooting Private Bell. In 2012, Holden summed up his feelings at the time, stating "By the time they were finished with me I would have admitted to killing JFK."

Holden's 1973 trial for murder lasted four days. After deliberating for 90 minutes, the judge told him "You will suffer death in the manner authorised by law". He was led, handcuffed to a prison officer, down the tunnel from the court to Crumlin Road Prison on the opposite side of the road. He was taken to the condemned man's cell in C wing, and by virtue of being on death row was allowed a black and white television and two bottles of beer a day.

Pressure grew on the British Secretary of State for Northern Ireland to abolish the death penalty, as it had been abolished in Britain in the 1960s. By July 1973 capital punishment was banned and Holden's death sentence was commuted to life imprisonment.

In September 1989, almost seventeen years after being interrogated in October 1972, Holden was released from Crumlin Road Prison. However, his terrorism conviction remained active, hindering Holden from finding regular employment. He appealed and, in 2012, prosecutors dropped their opposition to his appeal, thus quashing the 1973 conviction.

He died on 15 September 2022, aged 68. In 2023 the High Court awarded his family £350,000 damages. The judge said "the plaintiff was subjected to waterboarding; he was hooded; he was driven in a car flanked by soldiers to a location where he thought he would be assassinated". He further said the soldiers had an "honest belief" they were acting lawfully but they had "unquestionably acted in bad faith".
