= Mitchell Silver =

American urban planner

Member of the Raleigh City Council
- Incumbent
- Assumed office December 2, 2024
- Preceded by: Mary Black-Branch
- Constituency: District A

Parks Commissioner of New York City
- In office May 1, 2014 – July 30, 2021
- Preceded by: Liam Kavanagh
- Succeeded by: Gabrielle Fialkoff

Personal details
- Born: June 27, 1960 (age 65) Brooklyn, New York, U.S.
- Education: Pratt Institute (BA); Hunter College (MA)

Mitchell J. Silver (born June 27, 1960) is an urban planner and former commissioner for the New York City Parks Department.

Appointed by Mayor Bill de Blasio, he assumed the office of New York City Parks Commissioner in May 2014, and led the department until his resignation in July 2021. He was president of the American Planning Association (APA) between 2011 and 2013, the first African American to hold the title.

Elected in 2024, he currently serves as a City Council member in Raleigh, North Carolina, where he served as chief Planning and Development Officer and Planning Director from 2005 to 2014.

== Education ==
Silver attended Midwood High School in Brooklyn. He has a bachelor's degree in Architecture from Pratt Institute and a Master of Urban Planning from Hunter College. He is certified by the American Institute of Certified Planners (AICP) and a licensed Professional Planner (PP) in the State of New Jersey.

== Career ==
He held roles as a policy and planning director for the Manhattan Borough President's office, a city planner for the New York City Department of Planning, a principal of a New York City-based planning firm, a town manager in New Jersey, and deputy planning director in Washington, D.C.

He served as chief Planning and Development Officer and Planning Director for the City of Raleigh, North Carolina previous to his NYC Parks Department position. He was president of the American Planning Association (APA) between 2011 and 2013, the first African American to hold the title.

In Raleigh, Silver directed a staff of 230 employees in the Departments of City Planning, Community Development and Inspections, in addition to four offices: Transportation Planning, Economic Development, Development Services, and the City's Urban Design Center. He served on the City's Executive Leadership team with the City Manager, Assistant City Managers, CFO and CIO. Silver led the comprehensive plan update process in Raleigh and oversaw a rewrite of the Development Code.

As president of APA, he led an international effort to elevate the value and rebirth of planning in the 21st century.

In 2015, he told the New York Times that Brooklyn Bridge Park was one of his favorite city parks.

=== New York City Parks Commissioner ===
Mayor Bill de Blasio named Silver the New York City's Parks Commissioner in 2014. At the time, the Mayor said: "He has a passion for fairness and equality, and he brings it to the work of government, and understands that we have to ensure that parks and open spaces are available in every community, and are well-maintained in every community in this city." The New York Times wrote that "Mr. Silver’s selection suggests that the mayor plans to confront the issue of inequality in the city’s parks."

In 2017, Silver appointed Marty Maher to the position of Brooklyn Parks Commissioner.

== Teaching and honors ==
He has taught graduate planning courses at Harvard Graduate School of Design, Hunter College, Brooklyn College, Pratt Institute, and North Carolina State University. Silver lectures throughout the United States and abroad on a variety of planning topics. He is a contributing author and editor of the International City/County Management Association (ICMA) latest edition of "Local Planning: Contemporary Principles and Practice," which is a resource for local governments engaged in planning.

In 2012, the Urban Times named him s top international thought leaders of the built environment today. The next year, UBM Future Cities named Silver as one of the top 100 City Innovators in the world and the Royal Town Planning Institute made him an honorary lifetime member. In 2014, he was inducted into the College of Fellows of the American Planning Association.

In 2016, Silver was elected a Fellow of the UK's Academy of Social Sciences (FAcSS).

In 2017, Silver was selected to become an Honorary American Society of Landscape Architects (ASLA) Member.

== Personal life ==
He is married to Mary, an administrator for the nonprofit Brooklyn Community Services, and they have a daughter. He is a confessed "social media addict."

Preceded by Liam Kavanagh	New York City Department of Parks and Recreation; Commissioner; 2014–2021	Succeeded by Gabrielle Fialkoff
