= Intelligence Authorization Act for Fiscal Year 2008 =

Bill vetoed by George W. Bush

The Intelligence Authorization Act for Fiscal Year 2008 (H.R. 2082) would have authorized funding levels for the 13 government intelligence agencies and increased oversight for the U.S. intelligence community. The bill would have also applied the standards in the U.S. Army Field Manual to the entire government, effectively barring the CIA and other agencies from using tactics like waterboarding in their interrogations. The bill was sponsored by Rep. Silvestre Reyes (D, TX-16).

The bill was vetoed by President Bush and did not receive enough votes to override the veto.

Two days after Barack Obama became president he issued an executive order ordering the CIA to apply the standards of the U.S. Army Field Manual.

== Bill history ==
=== Initial debate and passage ===
Introduced on May 1, 2007, the House passed a version of the Intelligence Authorization Act for Fiscal Year 2008 (H.R. 2082) less than two weeks later, by a vote of 225–197.

The Senate soon followed suit after a brief internal debate, approving a similar version of the intelligence bill by voice vote on October 3, 2007.

=== Anti-torture provisions inserted during conference committee ===
When the bill came out of conference committee on Dec. 6, 2007, it had a provision barring the CIA and the rest of the federal government from many interrogation tactics criticized as "torture" and "abusive" by civil liberties groups, including waterboarding. The provision was inserted by Sen. Dianne Feinstein (D-Calif.).

The inserted provision would limit the CIA to the 19 interrogation tactics in the U.S. Army Field manual, effectively banning waterboarding, exposure to extreme temperatures and other techniques used on war on terror detainees after the Sept. 11, 2001, terrorist attacks in the U.S. It bans a total of eight interrogation techniques: mock executions, beatings, electrical shocks, forced nakedness, sexual acts, causing hypothermia and heat injuries.

Congress had banned the military from using such attacks through the Detainee Treatment Act of 2005. Sen. John McCain (R-Ariz.) had sponsored the Act, but opposed the conference committee ban because, he said, it applied military standards to intelligence agencies. McCain also said that waterboarding was forbidden under current law, but asked the Bush administration to clarify the matter by declaring it illegal.

The House approved the bill by a vote of 222–199.

Before the Senate voted in February, there were two weeks of debate over the CIA's use of waterboarding on three al-Qaeda prisoners in 2002 and 2003. The United States Department of Justice was also expected to tell the House that "there has been no determination by the Justice Department" whether legal or illegal. The Bush administration had also just announced that it planned to put six War on Terror detainees from Guantanamo Bay - five of whom had been subjected to the CIA tactics - on trial for involvement in the Sept. 11, 2001, terrorist attacks.

The Senate approved the conference report by a 51–45 vote on Feb. 13, 2008.

=== Veto by President Bush and failed House override ===
As he promised, President Bush vetoed the legislation on March 8. His veto applied to the authorization of the entire intelligence budget for the 2008 fiscal year, but he cited the waterboarding ban as the reason.

On March 11, Speaker Nancy Pelosi (D-Calif.) attempted but failed to lead the House in a vote overriding the veto, 224–188.
