= Stephen Powers (artist) =

American artist (born 1968)

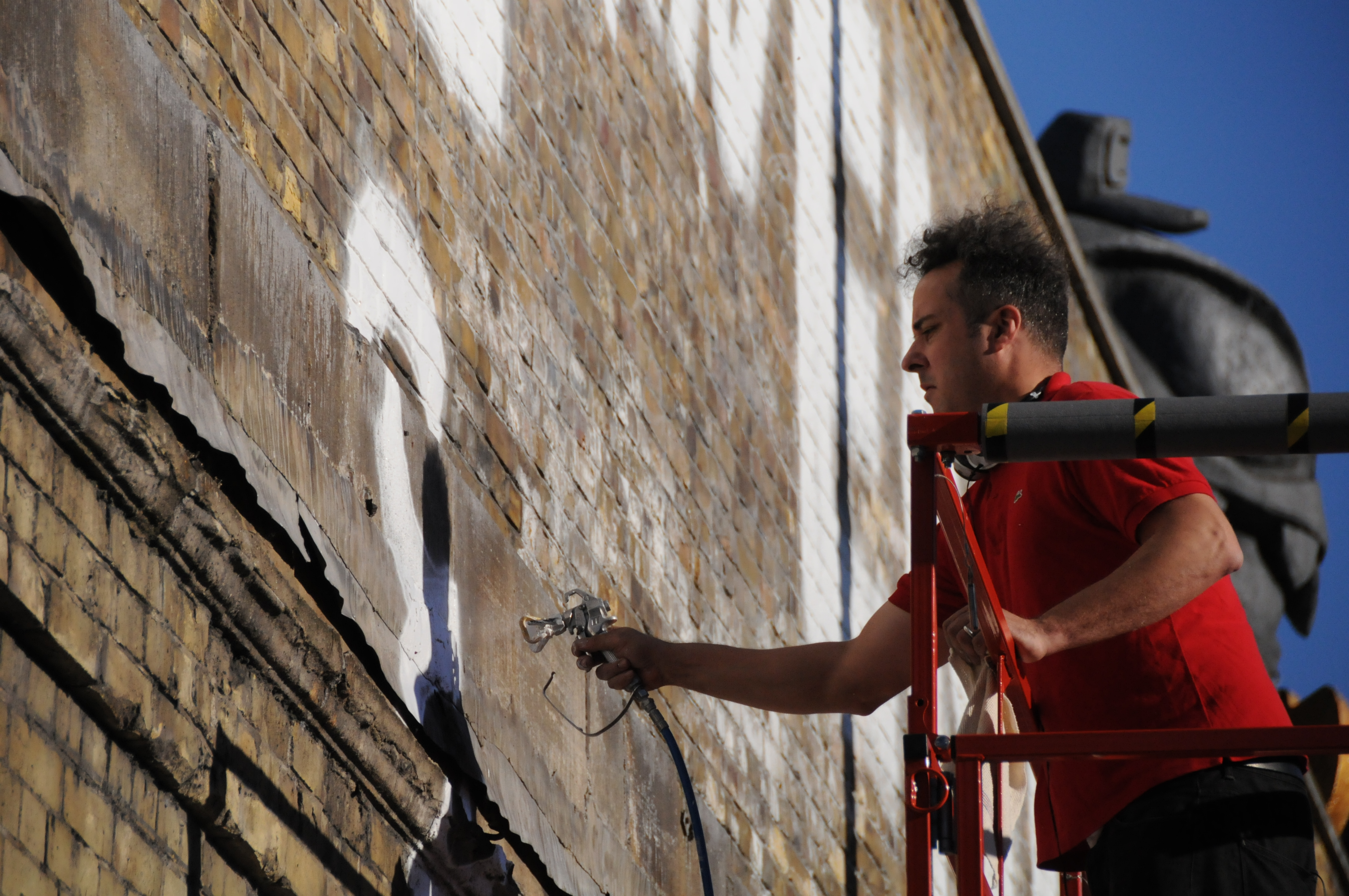
- Powers in 2010
- Born: Stephen J. Powers; May 25, 1968 (age 58); Philadelphia, Pennsylvania, U.S.
- Other names: ESPO, Steve Powers
- Education: The Art Institute of Philadelphia, University of the Arts
- Notable work: Waterboarding Thrill Ride, Love Letters
- Awards: Fulbright scholar (2007), Pew Center for Arts (2009)
- Website: www.firstandfifteenth.net

Stephen J. Powers (born May 25, 1968) is an American contemporary artist and muralist. He is also known by the name ESPO ("Exterior Surface Painting Outreach"), and Steve Powers. He lives in New York City.

== Biography ==
Powers is from Philadelphia and took classes at The Art Institute of Philadelphia, and the University of the Arts.

In 1994, Powers moved to New York City to expand On the Go magazine, a hip hop magazine founded by Powers. Working under the name 'Espo', he painted throughout the city becoming known during the late 1990s for his thematic graffiti 'pieces', for On the Go magazine, and for his 1999 book The Art of Getting Over, which placed stories told by other graffiti writers alongside photos of their work. His graffiti work often blurred the lines between illegal and legal, for example by creating pieces that appeared to be legitimate advertisements or by painting abandoned shop fronts in daylight.

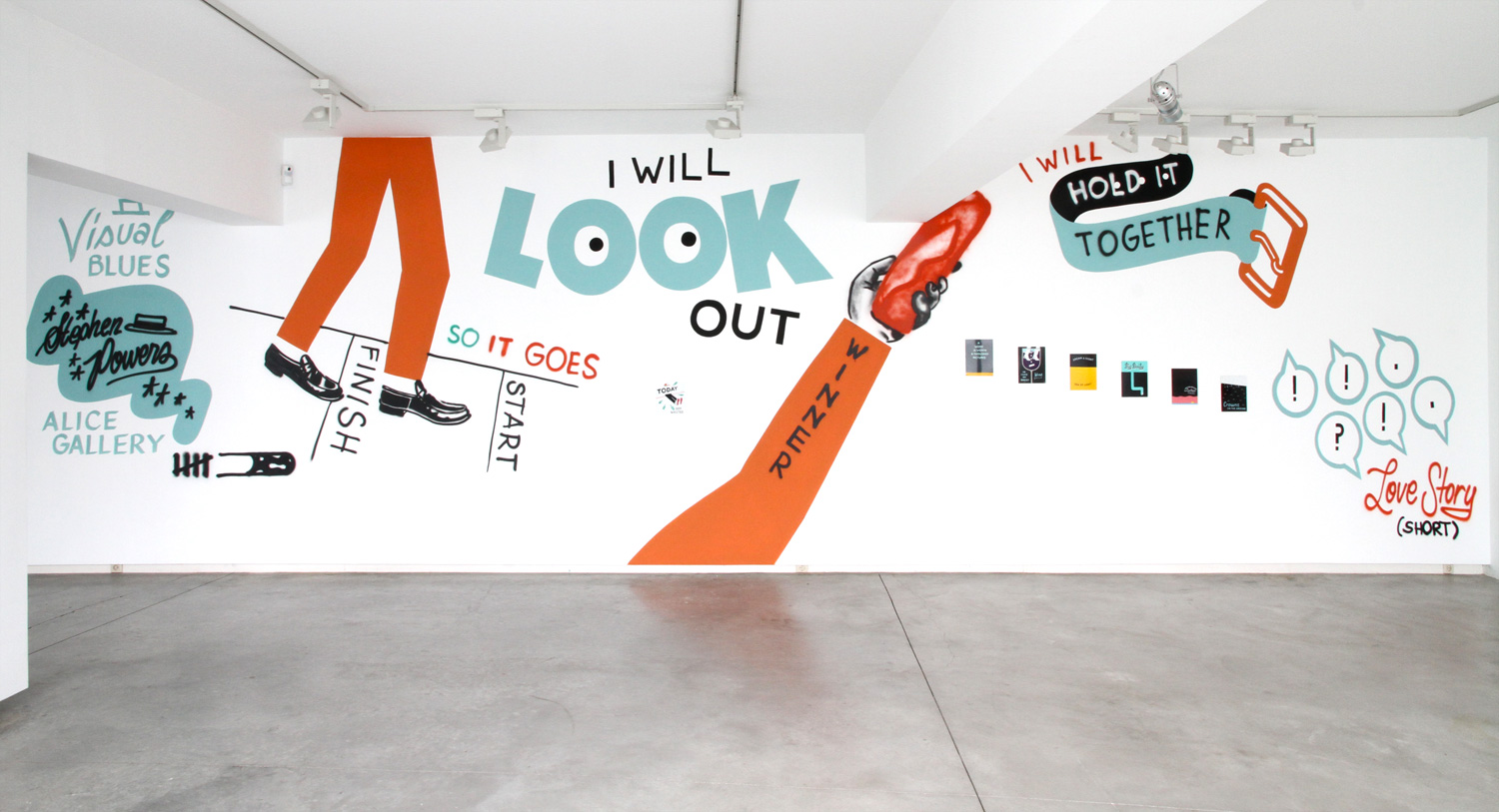
Stephen Powers painted the walls of ALICE gallery for his solo show 'Visual Blues'

In 2000, Powers gave up graffiti to become a full-time studio artist. He is now a mixed media artist, working in drawing, painting, printmaking, and installation art. Power's work has been shown in the Venice and Liverpool biennials, as well as shows at New York City's Deitch Gallery.

In 2005, he organised The Dreamland Artists Club, a project in which professional artists helped Coney Island merchants by repainting their signs. Powers first solo museum exhibition was in the fall of 2007, at the Pennsylvania Academy of the Fine Arts which showed the work from his Coney Island sign shop.

In 2007, Powers was awarded a Fulbright scholarship. He used the grant to create murals in Dublin, Ireland and in Belfast's Shankhill area, with the assistance of local teenagers. His work in Belfast was inspired by the area's political murals.

Waterboarding Thrill Ride, a waterboarding themed installation at Coney Island.

In 2009, Powers produced a series of murals in Philadelphia about the complexities of personal relationships, titled A Love Letter for You. He painted 50 murals along the elevated train in West Philadelphia. The project was sponsored by a $260,000 grant from the Pew Center for Arts & Heritage and was produced by the Philadelphia Mural Arts Program. The 'Love Letters' series continued in Syracuse on railroad overpasses (2010); A Love Letter to Brooklyn (2011), which consisted of painting an old Macy's building occupying an entire city block in Downtown Brooklyn; A Love Letter to Baltimore (2014);

In November 2015 Powers exhibited "Stephen Powers: Coney Island Is Still Dreamland (To a Seagull)" at The Brooklyn Museum. In 2019, Powers created a site specific commission for SFMOMA's third-floor architecture and design gallery.

Powers has exhibited internationally, including at Deitch Projects (New York, NY), the 49th Venice Biennale (with Barry McGee and Todd James) (Venice, Italy), Apex Art (New York), Brazilian Cultural Pavilion (São Paulo, Brazil), Art In The Streets curated by Jeffrey Deitch, MOCA (Los Angeles, CA), and as part of Beautiful Losers, (Contemporary Art Center, Cincinnati, OH; Yerba Buena Art Center, San Francisco, CA; Orange County Museum of Art, Newport Beach, CA; Triennale di Milano, Milan, Italy; Le Tri Postal, Lille, France)

His work is in the collection of the Philadelphia Museum Of Art.

== Solo exhibitions ==
- 2003 – City Arts Centre, Dublin
- 2004 – My List Of Demands, Deitch Projects, New York, NY
- 2007 – The Magic Word, The Pennsylvania Academy of Fine Art, Philadelphia, PA
- 2011 – Days, V1 Gallery, Copenhagen, Denmark
- 2016 – Stephen Powers: Coney Island Is Still Dreamland (To a Seagull), Brooklyn Museum
- 2019 – 2020 – Daymaker – SFMOMA

== Public art ==
- 2004 – Dreamland Artist Club – Creative Time, New York, NY. ESPO co-curated and participated in a project at Coney Island.
- 2008 – Waterboard Thrill Ride – part of Creative Time's Democracy In America Exhibition, Coney Island, NY
- 2009 – A Love Letter For You – A The Mural Arts Program collection of murals in Philadelphia.
- 2010 – Love Letter For Syracuse – Paintings on train bridges in Syracuse, NY. Sponsored by Syracuse University
- 2010 – VOLTO JA (I'll Be Back) – Sponsored by SESC
- 2011 – Love Letter To Brooklyn – Mural project in Brooklyn
- 2014 – Love Letter to Baltimore – Mural project in conjunction with Baltimore Public Arts
- 2015 – Bisous Mchou Charleroi Belgium
- 2016 – Olde City – Philadelphia, PA
- 2017 – O'Miami Poetry Festival – Miami Beach, FL
- 2018 – Coney Island Art Walls – Coney Island NY
- 2018 – 18th and Sansom – Philadelphia, PA
- 2019 – Pier 40 – R.E.D. – New York, NY
- 2020 – During the COVID-19 pandemic, Powers painted a mural on the boarded up windows of a retail store in Soho, New York City.

== Arrest ==
In December 1999, Powers was charged with six counts of criminal mischief. Powers contends that the arrest was politically motivated. The arrest took place in his home, after he had participated in a protest conceived by artist Joey Skaggs, against New York City Mayor Rudolph Giuliani's attempt to shut down a controversial art show, Sensation, at the Brooklyn Museum. During the protest, Powers and others threw fake elephant dung at a caricature of Giuliani, which Powers had painted for the protest. Powers pled guilty to one charge, saying he was "ready to grow on."

An editorial in The New York Times criticized the Giuliani administration for its secrecy in the case, but also dismissed Powers as a self-promoter. TheVillage Voice sympathized with Powers: "it's truly scary to think that if you invite people to throw artificial dung at a portrait of the mayor [...] the police will raid your apartment." However, the article was also critical of Powers' graffiti status, describing him as an egotistical, careerist "celebrity offender". Powers ultimately performed five days of community service.

== Gallery ==
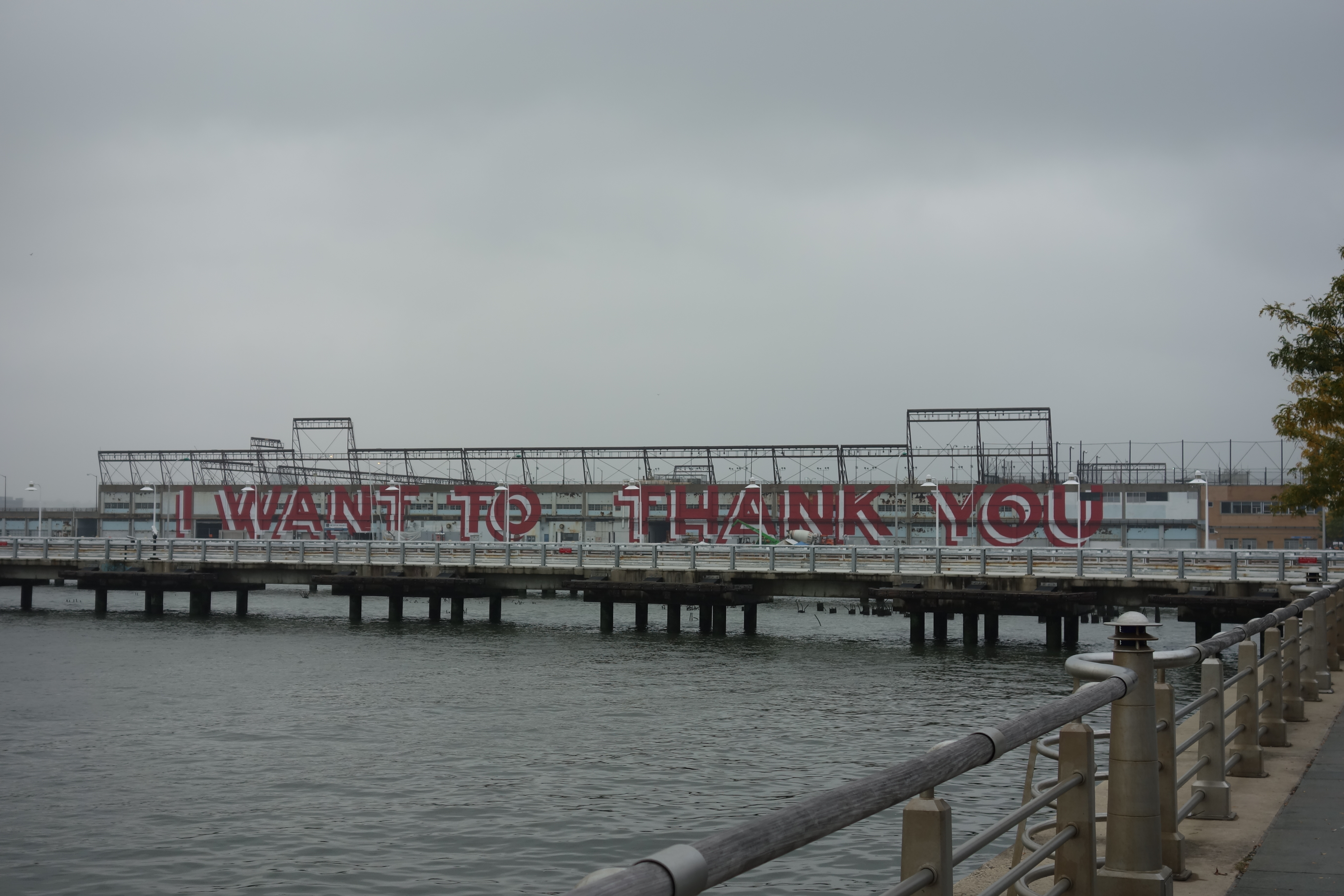
Large scale mural at Pier 40, Hudson River Park, NYC - 2019

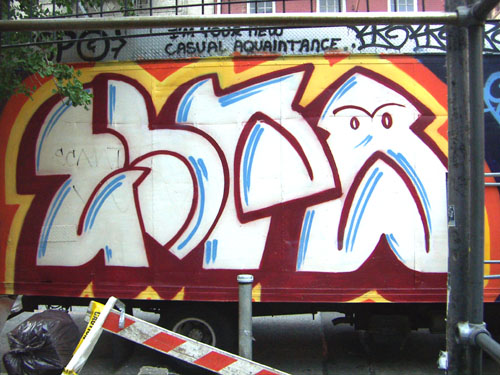
ESPO, 2005

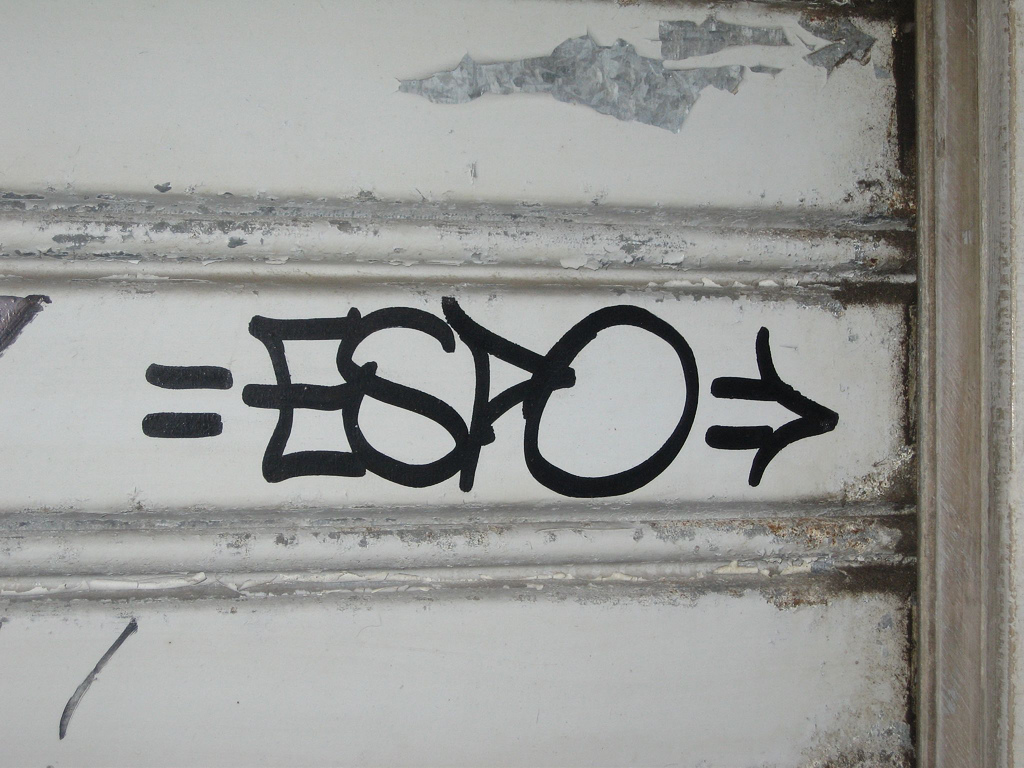
ESPO tag, Italy - 2005

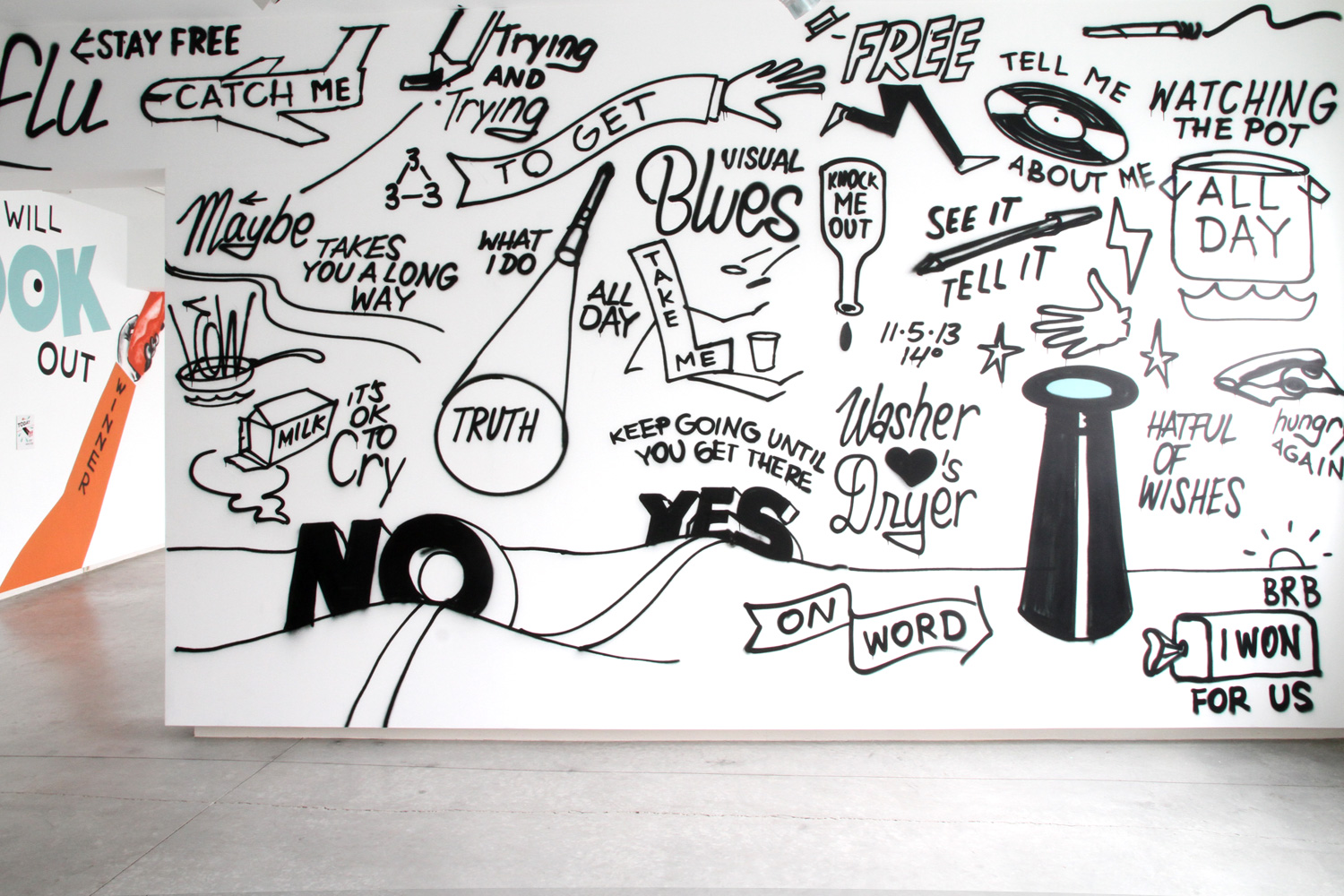
ALICE Gallery, Brussels - 2013

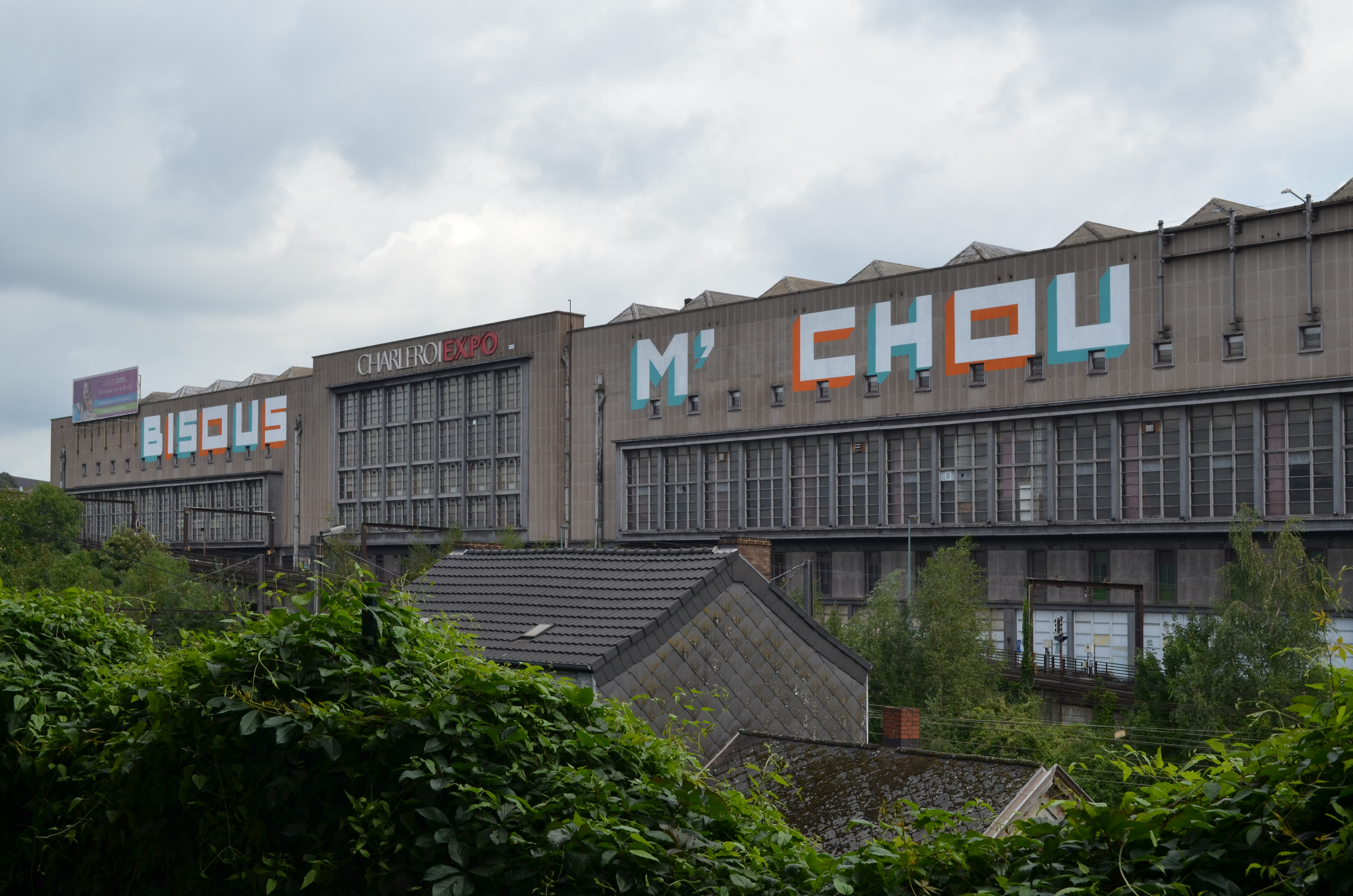
Charleroi, 2014

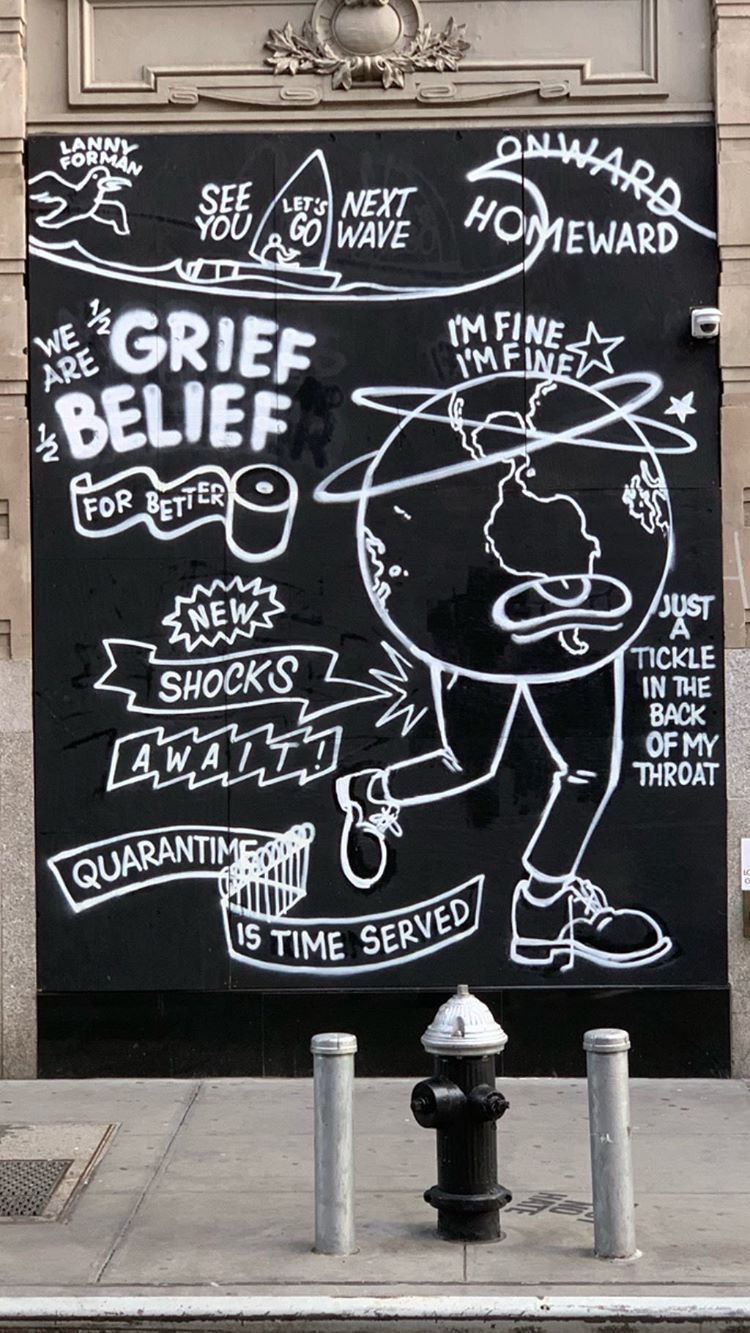
Painted boarded up storefront during the COVID-19 pandemic, SOHO NYC - 2020

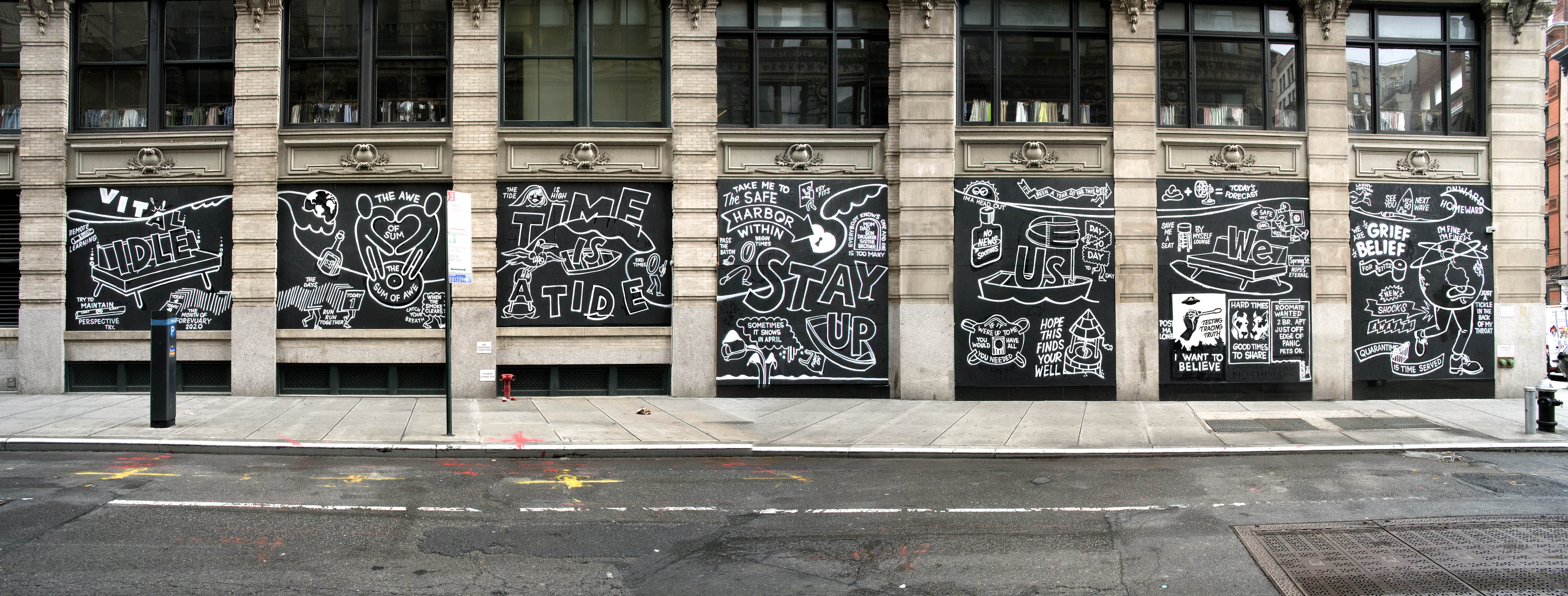
Full COVID-19 pandemic mural, SOHO NYC - 2020

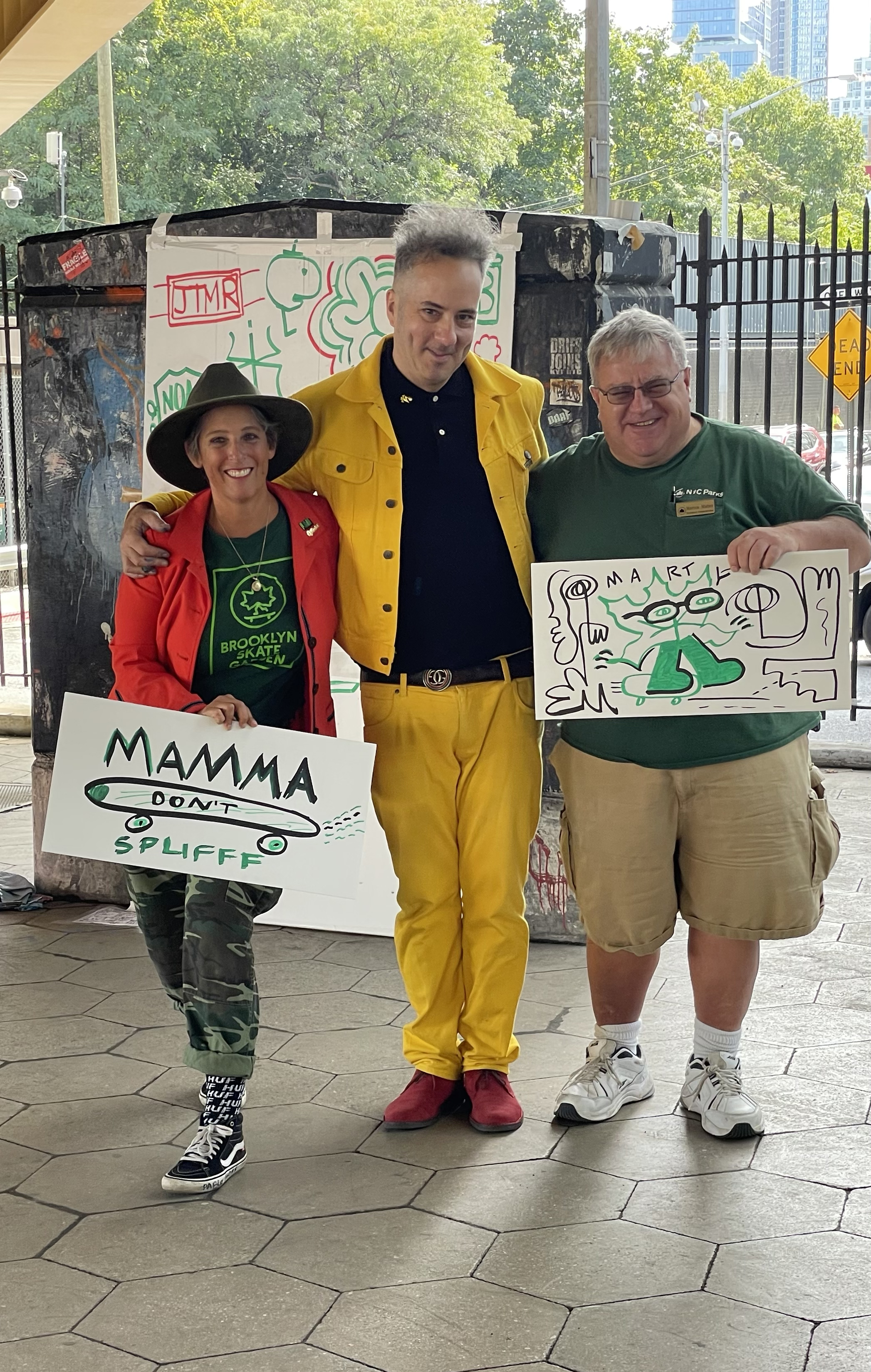
ESPO gives public art & design lecture at Fat Kid Skatepark, Brooklyn, NY with Loren Michelle, Pablo Ramirez's mother and Brooklyn parks commissioner Martin Maher - 2021

== Bibliography ==
- Powers, Stephen, The Art of Getting Over (1999), St. Martin's Press, ISBN 9780312206307
- Kawachi, Taka, Street Market: Barry McGee, Stephen Powers, Todd James (2000), Little More, ISBN 978-4898150399
- Powers, Stephen, First & Fifteenth: Pop Art Short Stories (2005), Villard, ISBN 9780345475596
- Snyder, Gregory, Graffiti Lives (2011), New York University Press, ISBN 9780814740460
- Powers, Stephen, A Love Letter to the City (2014), Princeton Architectural Press, ISBN 9781616892081
