= Executive Order 13440 =

2007 United States executive order

- Interpretation of the Geneva Conventions Common Article 3 as Applied to a Program of Detention and Interrogation Operated by the Central Intelligence Agency
- Front page of Executive Order 13440
- Type: Executive order
- Number: 13440
- President: George W. Bush
- Signed: July 20, 2007; 18 years ago

Federal Register details
- Federal Register document number: 07-3656
- Document citation: 72 FR 40707

Repealed by
- Executive Order 13491, January 22, 2009; 17 years ago

Executive Order 13440 is an executive order issued by United States President George W. Bush on July 20, 2007, ordering limited compliance with the Geneva Conventions in the treatment of captives held in extrajudicial detention by the Central Intelligence Agency. The full title of the order is: Executive Order 13440 – Interpretation of the Geneva Conventions Common Article 3 as Applied to a Program of Detention and Interrogation Operated by the Central Intelligence Agency.

On January 22, 2009, President Barack Obama issued Executive Order 13493, which rescinded Executive Order 13440.

== Reason ==
The opening statements of the order gives insight on the reason the order was created. Bush explains that Al Qaeda and Taliban are unlawful enemies that cause terror to the America and her allies, thus they are not entitled to the prisoner of war protections provided by the Third Geneva Conventions. He then again gives reasoning for this decision on July 21, 2007, the day after the order was issued, when Bush gave a radio address to explain the reasoning for this order. Bush states that ever since 9/11 the United States have taken many steps to keep the people safe. He also says that the terrorists group Al Qaeda, is becoming an evolving terrorist threat according to the "Terrorist Threat to the US Homeland" assessment, a summary made by the Director of National Intelligence. The order does not include torture, murder, sexual violence, inhumane treatment, and they also had to have their basic needs of living while in detention facilities. This only applies to detainees part of Al Qaeda, Taliban, and any one who could give information to help find leaders or important figures in the terrorist group. This order in general was created to obtain information from terrorists groups to protect the America and people.
