= Executive Order 13491 =

Order issued by Barack Obama in 2009

- Ensuring Lawful Interrogations
- Type: Executive order
- Number: 13491
- President: Barack Obama
- Signed: January 22, 2009

Executive Order 13491 is an executive order issued on January 22, 2009, by United States President Barack Obama ordering compliance with US domestic law, and its international agreements, in its treatment of captives. The full title of the order is Executive Order 13491 – Ensuring Lawful Interrogations.

As part of this order, Obama rescinded Executive Order 13440.
