= Martin Maher (parks commissioner) =

Brooklyn Parks Commissioner

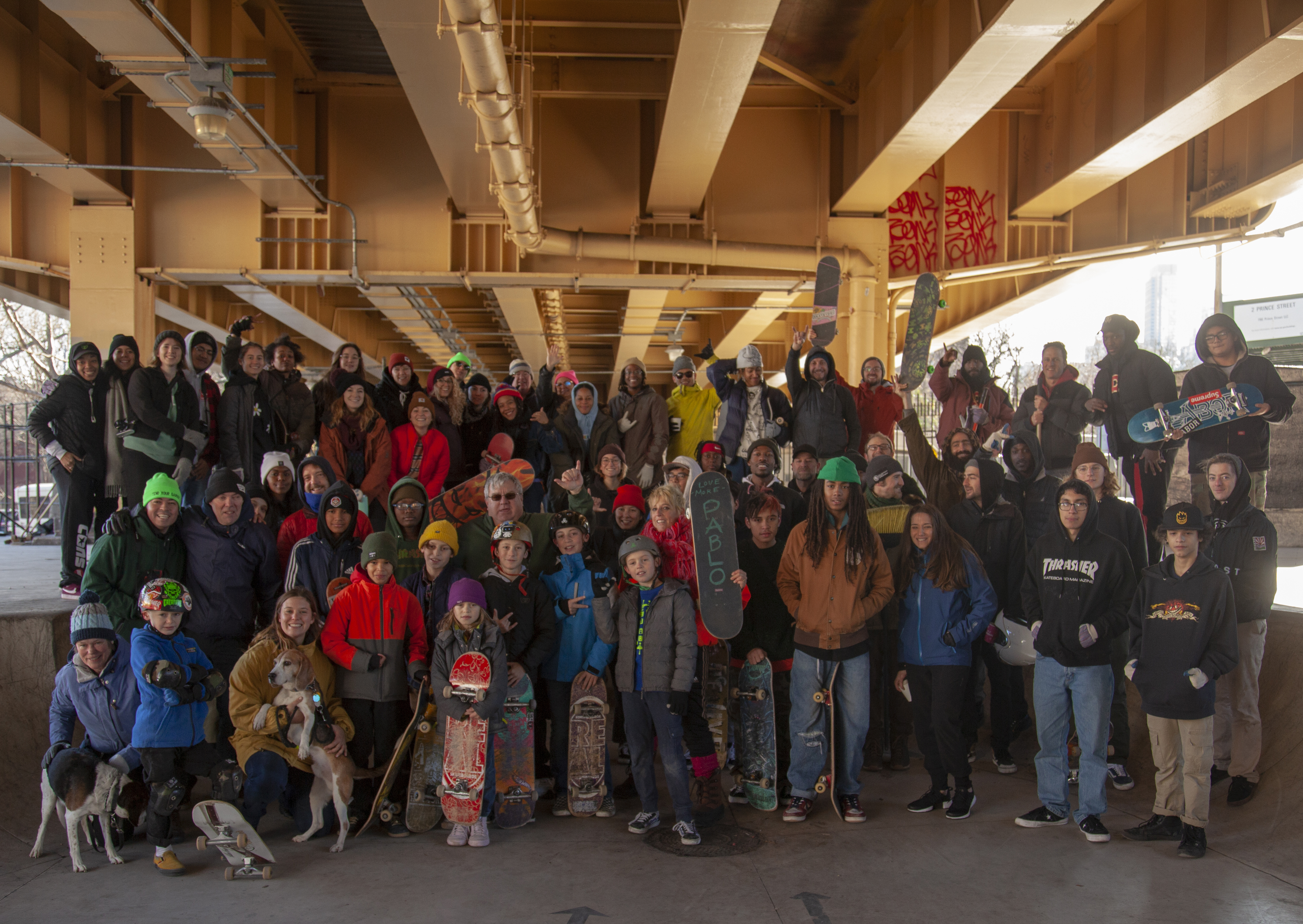

Brooklyn Parks Commissioner
- Incumbent
- Assumed office February 2017
- Appointed by: Mitchell Silver

Personal details
- Born: Martin Maher
- Occupation: Brooklyn Parks Borough Commissioner
- Nickname: Marty Maher

Martin "Marty" Maher is the Brooklyn Parks Commissioner for the New York City Department of Parks and Recreation, assuming the office in 2017.

== Career ==
Maher is a 27-year veteran of the Coast Guard and served in the Persian Gulf War. He served as a boatswain's mate. For over 45 years, Maher has been involved with the Boy Scouts of America.

=== New York City Department of Parks and Recreation ===
Maher began his career in the Parks department as an Urban Park Ranger. Additionally, Maher worked in a spectrum of different positions with-in the department from manager at Coney Island, to inspector at Shea Stadium, to Yankee Stadium, to the 79th Street Boat Basin, and Randall's Island. Before being appointed the Brooklyn Parks Commissioner, Maher served as chief of staff for 18 years in the Parks Department's Brooklyn office. Since assuming the commissioner's office in 2017, Maher has opened and renovated parks throughout Brooklyn.

==== Brooklyn Parks Commissioner ====
In February, 2017 Maher was appointed Brooklyn Parks Commissioner by New York City Parks Commissioner Mitchell Silver.

===== Skatepark advocacy =====
Maher is a proponent of skateparks and actions sports. He believes there should be a skatepark in every community in Brooklyn. As of December 2020, Brooklyn has 15 public skateparks, with 4 additional skateparks in the works. In the late 2010s, Maher worked with a community group in Brownsville, Brooklyn, led by local professional skateboarder Wade Yates, to fund a skatepark built by Spohn Ranch in Betsy Head Park. Maher initiated the Skatefest event series, hosted by the Parks Department. Skate Fest II took place at Ocean Hill Playground in Brownsville.

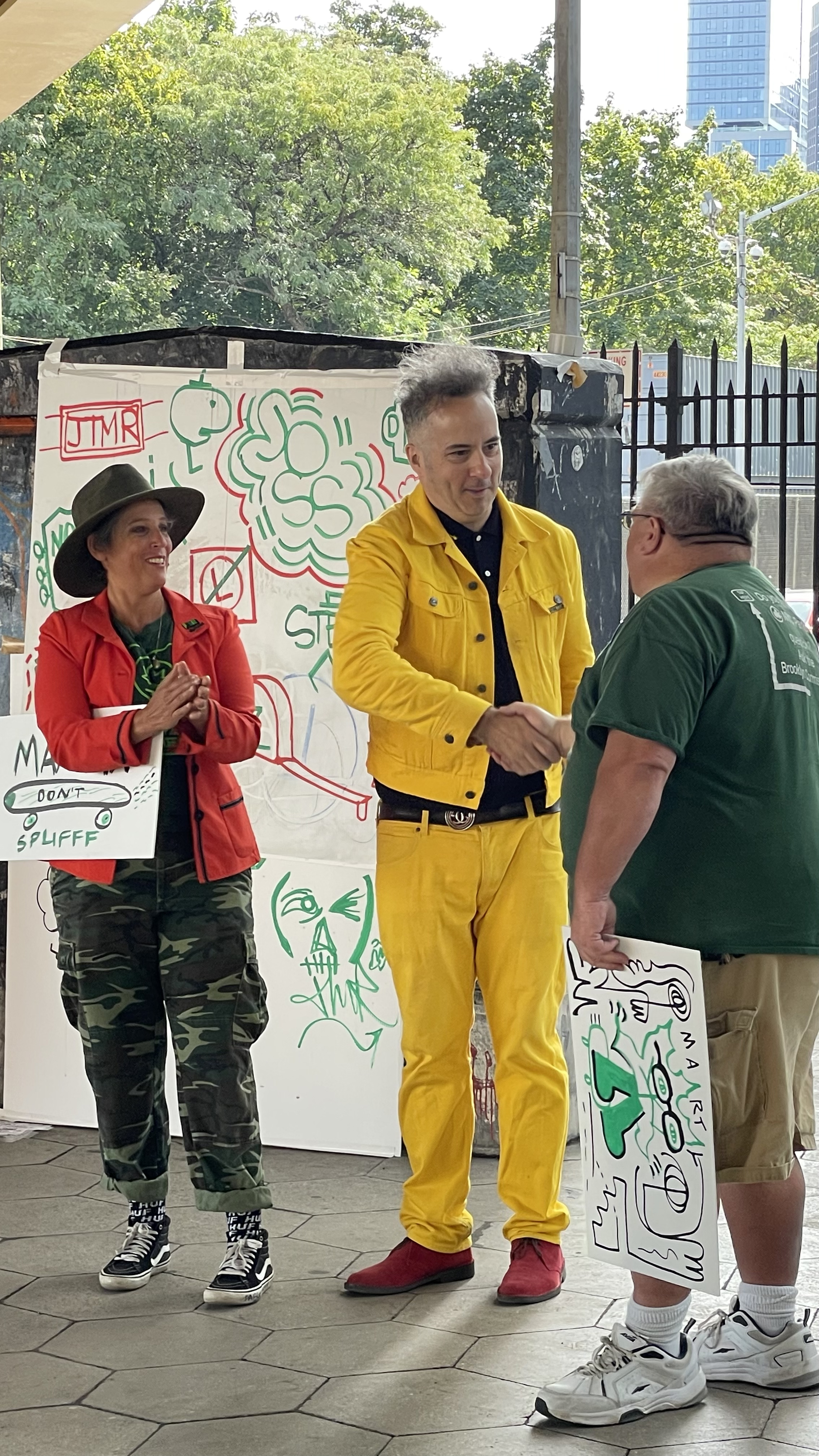
Loren Michelle, mother of late skateboarder Pablo Ramirez watches and claps as ESPO aka Stephen Powers and Martin Maher shake hands at Goldonda Playground - October, 2021.

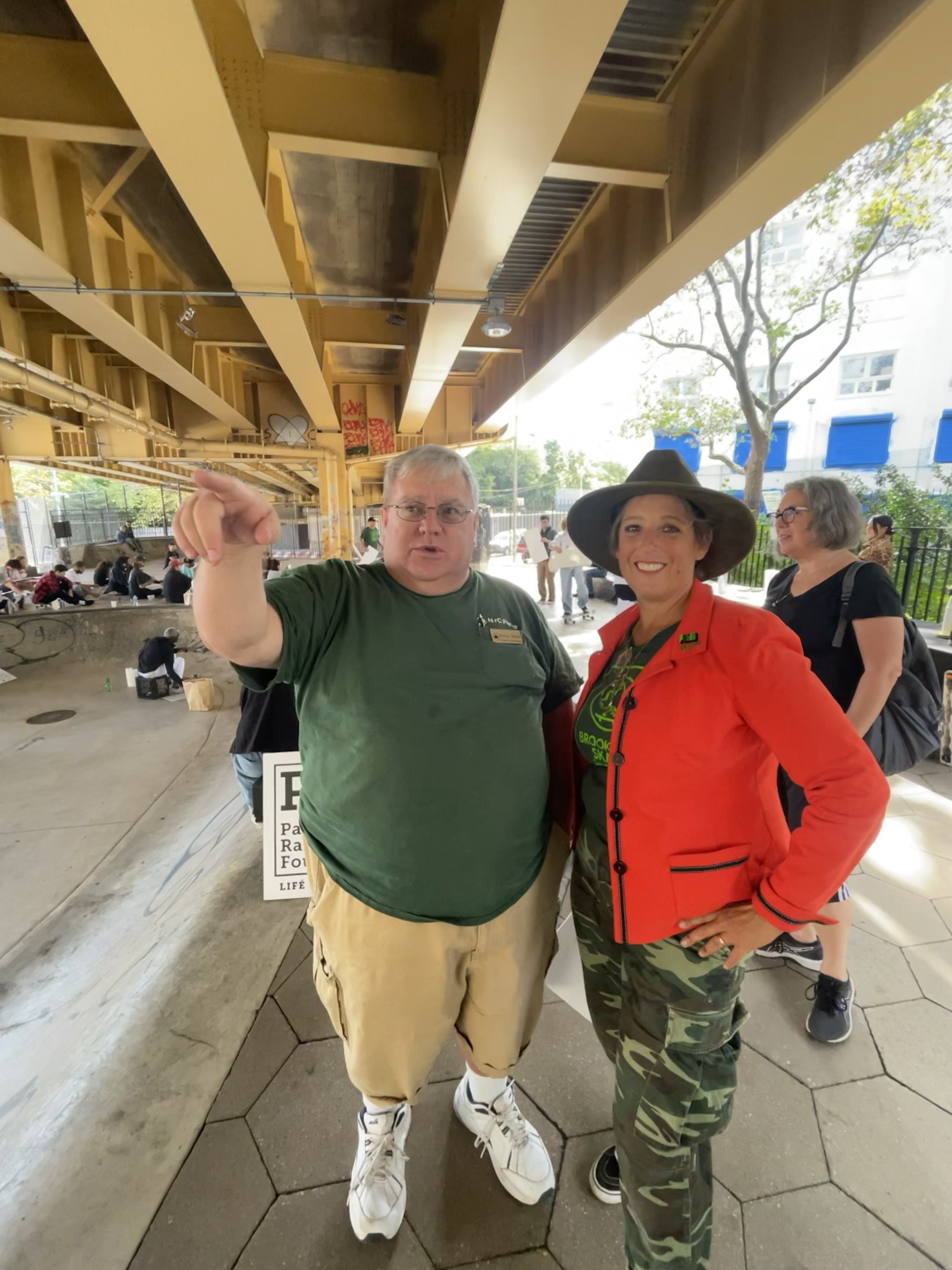
Martin Maher Loren Michelle talk at Golconda - Pablo Ramirez Foundation
