= Extrajudicial prisoners of the United States =

Foreign nationals the United States detains outside of the legal process

Extrajudicial prisoners of the United States, in the context of the early twenty-first century war on terrorism, refers to foreign nationals the United States detains outside of the legal process required within United States legal jurisdiction. In this context, the U.S. government is maintaining torture centers, called black sites, operated by both known and secret intelligence agencies. Such black sites were later confirmed by reports from journalists, investigations, and from men who had been imprisoned and tortured there, and later released after being tortured until the CIA was comfortable they had done nothing wrong, and had nothing to hide.

Of these prisoners being held by the U.S., some were suspected of being from the senior ranks of al Qaeda, referred to in U.S. military terms as "high value detainees." According to the Swiss senator Dick Marty's reports on Secret Detentions and Illegal Transfers of Detainees involving Council of Europe Member States, about a hundred persons had been kidnapped by the CIA on European territory and subsequently rendered to countries where they were tortured.

Former Secretary of Defense, Donald Rumsfeld, had described the men detained in Camp Delta at Guantánamo Bay, Cuba, as "the worst of the worst.", despite concerns about the mental capacity of several of the detainees. But, before September 2006, many of those detainees suspected of having the highest intelligence value were not detained at Guantanamo, but were held at CIA's black sites in Eastern Europe and other countries, including Afghanistan.

In August 2010, it was reported that four high-value detainees: Abu Zubaydah, Abd al-Rahim al-Nashiri, Ramzi bin al-Shibh, and Mustafa al-Hawsawi, had first been transferred to Guantanamo on September 24, 2003. They were held at "Strawberry Fields", a secret camp in the facility constructed for their detention. Worried that a pending Supreme Court decision on habeas corpus rights might go against the Bush administration and compel releasing the men's names and other details, the CIA took back custody of the four men and moved them out of Guantanamo on March 27, 2004.

The United States Supreme Court ruled in Rasul v. Bush (2004) that detainees at Guantanamo Bay detention camp had the habeas corpus right to challenge their detentions before an impartial tribunal. As a result, the US allegedly continued to hold many ghost detainees outside Guantanamo Bay and the United States in order to avoid any review of their cases.

These four men and other high-value CIA detainees were not transferred again to military custody at Guantanamo until September 2006. At that time, the Bush administration was assured of passage by Congress of the Military Commissions Act of 2006, which included provisions preventing detainees from using habeas corpus petitions outside the newly authorized system of military tribunals.

== Ghost detainees ==
Ghost detainees are extrajudicial prisoners whose identities have not been revealed and whose families (and frequently, governments) have not been informed of their status. They are deprived of all legal rights. Ghost detainees' identities, and capture, have been kept secret. As such they are a subset of extrajudicial prisoners, which includes all the detainees who were held in Guantanamo, etc..

== Suspects held by US civilian intelligence agencies ==
=== High-value detainees ===
On September 6, 2006, U.S. President George W. Bush confirmed, for the first time, that the CIA had held "high-value detainees" in secret CIA prisons. He also announced that 14 senior captives were being transferred from CIA custody to military custody at Guantanamo Bay. He said that these 14 captives could expect to face charges before Guantanamo military commissions.

Critics, and elements of the FBI, had long speculated that the captives held in the secret facilities had been subjected to actual torture. They said that evidence derived from such interrogation techniques was not admissible in court and could not be used to prosecute the men.

The fourteen "high-value detainees" transferred on September 6, 2006
JTF-GTMO ISN	Name	Notes
10011	Mustafa al-Hawsawi	believed to have arranged large wire transfers of funds to finance terrorist operations.; captured in Pakistan in March 2003; transferred from CIA custody to Guantanamo in September 2003; withdrawn and transferred back to CIA custody in March 2004; President Bush announced his transfer to the Guantanamo Bay detention camps, in Cuba, on September 6, 2006.
10012	Ahmed Khalfan Ghailani	helped plan the 1998 embassy bombings.; captured July 25, 2004; President Bush announced his transfer to the Guantanamo Bay detention camps, in Cuba, on September 6, 2006.; convicted of conspiracy and sentenced to life in prison without parole; held at ADX Supermax in Florence, Colorado.
10013	Ramzi bin al-Shibh	believed to be another planner of the 9-11 attacks.; shared a Hamburg apartment with Mohamed Atta, the ringleader of the 9-11 hijackers.; transferred from CIA custody to Guantanamo in September 2003; withdrawn and transferred back to CIA custody in March 2004; President Bush announced his transfer to the Guantanamo Bay detention camps, in Cuba, on September 6, 2006.
10014	Waleed Muhammad bin Attash	allegedly tied to both the USS Cole bombing and 9-11; captured on April 29, 2003; Human Rights Watch reports he is said to have described ties between Iran and al Qaeda during his interrogation; President Bush announced his transfer to the Guantanamo Bay detention camps, in Cuba, on September 6, 2006.
10015	Abd al-Rahim al-Nashiri	believed to be the mastermind of the USS Cole bombing.; believed to have organized the Limburg tanker bombing; captured in November 2002; transferred from CIA custody to Guantanamo in September 2003; withdrawn and transferred back to CIA custody in March 2004; President Bush announced his transfer to the Guantanamo Bay detention camps, in Cuba, on September 6, 2006.
10016	Abu Zubaydah	believed to have run a military training camp associated with al Qaeda.; believed to have played a role in the 2000 millennium attack plots; transferred from CIA custody to Guantanamo in September 2003; withdrawn and transferred back to CIA custody in March 2004; President Bush announced his transfer to the Guantanamo Bay detention camps, in Cuba, on September 6, 2006.; Later revealed to have been a low-level player and not significant; Because of having suffered torture, he has never been charged
10017	Abu Faraj al-Libi	described as the new number three in al Qaeda, succeeding his mentor Khalid Sheikh Mohammed.; captured in Pakistan on May 2, 2005; President Bush announced his transfer to the Guantanamo Bay detention camps, in Cuba, on September 6, 2006.
10018	Ali Abdul Aziz Ali	helped transfer funds to the 9-11 hijackers.; arrested on April 29, 2003; President Bush announced his transfer to the Guantanamo Bay detention camps, in Cuba, on September 6, 2006.
10019	Hambali	captured on August 11, 2003.; a planner of the Bali nightclub bombings; President Bush announced his transfer to the Guantanamo Bay detention camps, in Cuba, on September 6, 2006.
10020	Majid Khan	President Bush announced his transfer to the Guantanamo Bay detention camps, in Cuba, on September 6, 2006.; An accomplice of Uzair Paracha
10021	Mohamad Farik Amin	reported arrested in June 2003.; helped scout the sites of terror bombings in Thailand
10022	Mohammed Nazir Bin Lep	President Bush announced his transfer to the Guantanamo Bay detention camps, in Cuba, on September 6, 2006.
10023	Gouled Hassan Dourad	Transferred to Guantanamo on September 6, 2006.
10024	Khalid Sheikh Mohammed	Allegedly played a role in the WTC bombing 1993.; Allegedly worked on Operation Bojinka; Allegedly one of the architects of 9-11.; Allegedly detained at various CIA black sites for about 3 years.; Allegedly waterboarded 183 times while in CIA custody.; Transfer to the Guantanamo Bay detention camps in September 2006.

=== Other captives in custody ===
American intelligence officials have made public the names of some of the suspects the CIA has reported to have been held. The capture of other detainees is not acknowledged. According to the US military, this is in order to spread disorder among their opponents, and fear among those who might be considering supporting them.

Other captives reported to have been held in CIA custody
Name	Notes
Jamil al-Banna	told his lawyers he was detained in "the dark prison" in Kabul; arrested in Gambia with Bisher al-Rawi; claims the CIA offered him $10 million to serve as a mole against Abu Qatada; He was transferred to military custody at Guantanamo Bay detainment camp in March 2003 and held there until December 19, 2007.
Muhammed al-Darbi	Claimed by administration to have been captured due to information derived from enhanced interrogation techniques of captives in secret interrogation centres.; A Yemeni, captured in August 2002.
Omar al-Faruq	alleged to have been a liaison with Southeast Asian Islamic militants; arrested June 5, 2002; escaped from Bagram prison in July 2005; killed by British troops in Iraq on September 25, 2006.
Abd al-Salam Ali al-Hila	currently detained in Camp Delta; told his lawyers he was detained in "the dark prison" in Kabul
Abd al-Hadi al-Iraqi	currently detained in Guantanamo
Adil al-Jazeeri	said to have been a liaison between al Qaeda and the Taliban; believed to have been involved in transferring funds for terrorist activities.; captured on June 17, 2003; transferred to US custody on July 13, 2003; US State department confirmed custody in December 2003, location unknown
Yassir al-Jazeeri
Ibn al-Shaykh al-Libi	may have been the first detainee to have been subjected to coercive interrogation techniques.; reported Iraq had an arsenal of WMD, and provided al Qaeda with WMD training, cited in Powell's UN speech; Recanted the WMD claim after the invasion; extradited to Libya and died in prison
Bisher al-Rawi	currently detained in Camp Delta; told his lawyers he was detained in "the dark prison" in Kabul; arrested in Gambia with Jamil al-Banna; now claims he was already co-operating with MI5 in their surveillance of Abu Qatada
Abdul Rahim al-Sharqawi	One of the 25 top al Qaeda leadership members.; al-Sharqawi is called "Riyadh the Facilitator,"; al-Sharqawi is said to have been captured before April 2002.
Mohammed Omar Abdel-Rahman	extradited to Egypt and released in 2010
Musaad Aruchi	
Hassin Bin Attash	currently detained in Camp Delta; told his lawyers he was detained in "the dark prison" in Kabul; claims he was tortured in the black sites; 17 years old when captured; brother of Waleed Muhammad bin Attash
Abdul Aziz	
Abu Faisal	
Hassan Ghul	He was held at a CIA black site for two years, before being turned over to a Pakistani prison system and released. Killed in a CIA drone strike in Pakistan in October 2012.
Mohammed Naeem Noor Khan	alleged Al-Qaeda operative and computer expert.; agreed to be a mole after his capture on July 13, 2004; mole status outed by Condoleezza Rice on August 2, 2004; released on 20 August 2007, without charge.
Muhammed Khudayr al-Dulaymi	believed to have been a senior intelligence official during the Saddam Hussein administration. In May 2009 it became public that Vice President Dick Cheney had pushed for Al Dulaymi to be subjected to waterboarding, in order to establish that Saddam had ties to international terrorists.
Tariq Mahmood
Binyam Mohammed	told his lawyers he was detained in "the dark prison" in Kabul; claims he was tortured in the black sites; On 23 February 2009, almost seven years after his arrest, Mohamed was repatriated from Guantánamo to the UK, where he was released after questioning.
Khalid El-Masri	German citizen wrongfully labelled terror-suspect, became a high-value detainee.; Abducted at behest of CIA by Macedonian police, based on "hunch" of CIA officer.; Raped in Skopje, rendered to Afghanistan, held in CIA Salt Pit; tortured by CIA.; Released (flown to Albania, "dumped in a forest, blindfolded") after CIA realized mistake.; US government warned German government to not press charges against CIA.; US courts refused to hear El-Masri's case; he was represented by the ACLU.; European Court of Human Rights ruled in El-Masri's favor, stating that it was "beyond a reasonable doubt" that he had been tortured in violation of the European Convention on Human Rights.

== Legal status of detainees ==
Shortly after the Invasion of Afghanistan, the Bush administration announced a policy that combatants captured "on the battlefield" in Afghanistan would not be afforded the protections of POW status as described in the Geneva Conventions. This policy triggered debate both within and outside of the US government. The Bush administration claimed that the Geneva Conventions signed by the US protected only the fighters of recognized states, thus disqualifying al Qaeda fighters from these privileges as per the Bush administration's views. They argued that, since the Taliban was not a legitimate government either, their combatants did not qualify either. They saw Afghanistan as a "failed state," one without a legitimate government.

=== Classifying captives as illegal combatants ===
The Bush administration categorized such captives as "illegal combatants." These terms are not explicitly used in the Geneva Conventions, but the Third Geneva Convention of 1949 defines the term "lawful combatant", from which the term 'unlawful combatant' is derived. The Convention obliges signatories to afford captured lawful combatants significant rights and protections. Such captives are entitled to be classified as prisoners of war (POW). Internal critics within the US military and US government argue that failing to afford POW protections to combatants captured in the global war on terror would endanger American military personnel when they were captured in current and future conflicts. Other critics argue that classifying all combatants as illegal combatants is in violation of Article 5 of the Third Geneva Convention, which describes how a captor should treat combatants who are suspected of violating the Geneva Conventions such that they strip themselves of its protections. Article 5 says that combatants suspected of violations of the Conventions are to be afforded POW protection until the captors have convened a "competent tribunal." However, the Conventions never explicitly impose a limitation regarding the detention of detainees without trial during and after an armed conflict.

The Bush administration expanded the criteria for classifying captives as illegal combatants. Individuals captured around the world are now classified as such if US intelligence officials believe they have sufficient evidence to tie the individual to Islamic terrorism.

In Rasul v. Bush (2004), the US Supreme Court ruled that detainees held by the United States did have the habeas corpus right to challenge their detentions before a competent tribunal. This decision led the Bush administration to bolster the prevalence of black sites overseas.

=== Use of interrogation techniques ===
The US intelligence community has debated what techniques should be used on the detainees. The debate was triggered over the interrogation of Ibn al-Shaykh al-Libi, described as the first senior al Qaeda captive. It was reported that initially his interrogation was being conducted by the FBI because they had the most experience interrogating criminal suspects. Their interrogation approach was based on building rapport with suspects and they did not use coercive techniques. They argued that coercive techniques produced unreliable false confessions, and that using coercive techniques would mean that the evidence they gathered could not be used by the prosecution in a trial in the US judicial system.

Fear and desire for actionable intelligence led the administration to legal opinions (the Torture Memos, including the Bybee memo) by the Office of Legal Counsel, United States Department of Justice, issued to the CIA in August 2002 authorizing the use of 12 enhanced interrogation techniques (since 2009, these have been legally defined as torture and prohibited from use) with detained suspects.

Similarly, on March 14, 2003, five days before the US started its 2003 invasion of Iraq, the OLC issued a memo to William J. Haynes, General Counsel of the United States Department of Defense, concluding that federal laws against the use of torture and other coercion did not apply to interrogations overseas. In reaction to the release of the abuse pictures from Abu Ghraib in Iraq in April and May 2004, and the leak that summer of the Bybee memo, the administration advised agencies to suspend actions based on those memos. CIA suspended the use of enhanced interrogation techniques.

=== Legal justification for the use of "enhanced interrogation techniques" ===
Secretary Rumsfeld assured the world that the detainees held at the Guantanamo Bay Naval Base were going to be treated in a manner consistent with the treatment of Geneva Convention POWs. In 2004, confidential memos surfaced that discussed the limits to how much pain, discomfort and fear could be used in the interrogation of detainees in the global war on terror. The memos showed that debate within the Bush administration had been resolved in favor of what was later legally determined to be torture.

=== Legislative challenges to interrogation policy ===
In 2005, US Senator John McCain, a former POW from the Vietnam War, attached a passage to a military spending bill that would proscribe inhumane treatment of detainees and restrict US officials to use only the interrogation techniques in the US Army's field manual on interrogation. Ninety of the one hundred Senators supported this amendment.

On Thursday, October 20, 2005, Vice President Dick Cheney proposed a change to McCain. Cheney tried to get McCain to limit the proscription to just military personnel, thus allowing CIA personnel the freedom to use harsher techniques. McCain declined to accept Cheney's suggestion.

=== U.S. Government denial of allegations of mistreatment ===
The United States government, through the State Department, makes periodic reports to the United Nations Committee Against Torture. In October 2005, the report focused on pretrial detention of suspects in the war on terrorism, including those held in Guantanamo Bay and Afghanistan. This was the first official response of the U.S. government to allegations that prisoners were mistreated at Guantanamo Bay detention camp. The report denies the allegations. However, the report does not address detainees held elsewhere by the CIA. Recently, the Director of the CIA, Michael Hayden has acknowledged that some detainees had been subject to waterboarding, in accordance with several OLC (Office of Legal Counsel) memos. General Hayden states that in February 2008, waterboarding was not part of the authorized interrogation techniques for U.S. agents.

The CIA's Inspector General investigated cases in which men were captured and transported through "erroneous renditions." There were said to be 3,000 individuals who were held in CIA custody.

=== Geneva Conventions compliance ===
On July 20, 2007, President Bush issued an executive order officially banning torture of POWs by intelligence officials. Amnesty International points out that the Bush administration has narrowly defined torture under the Bybee memo, at the time, the only known one of the Torture Memos. While the US is a signatory to the Geneva Conventions of 1949, it has failed to ratify that portion of the Geneva Convention, Protocol I, which would grant such persons POW status as the detainees at Guantanamo. The US is one of only six countries that have not.

=== Individuals identified as being tortured by the CIA without authorization ===
The Senate Intelligence Committee identified these men as being the victims of unauthorized torture
ISN	Name	Current location	Allegations	Notes
10024	Khalid Sheikh Mohammed	Guantanamo	Various	various
892	Rafiq Bashir al-Hami	Transferred to Slovakia in 2010	Suspicious acquaintances	subjected to sleep deprivation at the salt pit
893	Tawfiq Nasir Awad al-Bihandi	Guantanamo	Unknown	subjected to sleep deprivation at the salt pit
	Hikmat Nafi Shaukat	Unknown	Suspicious acquainces	subjected to sleep deprivation at the salt pit
1209	Lufti al-Arabi al-Gharisi	Unknown	Unknown	subjected to sleep deprivation at the salt pit
1461	Muhammad Ahmad Ghulam Rabbani	Transferred to Pakistan in 2023	Alleged KSM lieutenant	stress positions, beatings, hypothermia
	Gul Rahman		Murdered in custody	short shackling, water dousing, beatings, sleep deprivation, auditory overload, total darkness, hypothermia
10015	Abd al-Rahim al-Nashiri	Guantanamo	USS Cole bombing	waterboarding, death threats, threats to rape and kill his family in front of him, faked execution, rectal feeding
10013	Ramzi Bin al-Shibh	Guantanamo	Alleged KSM lieutenant	
	Mohammed Omar Abdel-Rahman	Extradited to Egypt and released in 2010	Unknown	water dousing, forced nudity, solitary confinement
10011	Mustafa al-Hawsawi	Guantanamo	Suspected "financier"	rectal feeding
	Abu Khalid	Unknown	Unknown	sleep deprivation
	Laid Ben Dohman Saidi aka Abu Hudhaifa	unknown	Mistaken identity	ice water baths, forced standing, sleep deprivation, forced nudity, dietary manipulation
	Abd al-Karim aka Al-Shara'iya	Unknown	Unknown	crippled by torture
	Abu Hazim	Unknown	Unknown	water dousing
	Sayyid Ibrahim	Unknown	Unknown	sleep deprivation
	Suleiman Abdullah	Unknown	Unknown	subjected to "water-dousing" without authorization

== Location of the suspects held by US civilian intelligence agencies ==
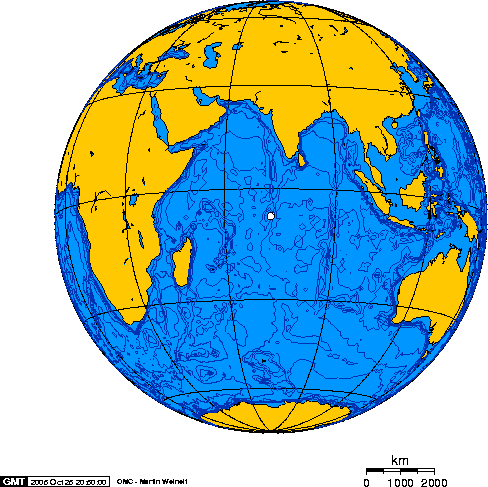
Orthographic projection centred over Diego Garcia in the Indian Ocean.

Location	Details
USS Bataan	John Walker Lindh, a United States citizen, was held for two months in a secure facility aboard the USS Bataan.
The Salt Pit	a clandestine, remote, CIA detention facility in Afghanistan; German national Khalid El-Masri, whose name was similar to that of a suspected senior al Qaeda cadre who was still at large, was arrested in Macedonia and transferred by their police to the CIA, who took him to this location. Agents detained and interrogated him for five months in the winter of 2004. The agency found it was mistaken and released him in Albania in late 2004. In 2012 El-Masri's account was held valid "beyond a reasonable doubt," and he was awarded compensation for his torture and suffering by the Grand Chamber of the European Court of Human Rights, which held Macedonia responsible for knowingly transferring him to the CIA and possible torture.

== See also ==
- Arbitrary arrest and detention
- Command responsibility
- Detainees in Iraq
- Khalid El-Masri, a German citizen wrongly detained by the CIA
- Maher Arar
- March 2025 American deportations of Venezuelans
