= Hayatullah =

Hayatullah (Arabic: حیات الله) is a male Muslim given name, composed of the elements Hayat and Allah. It may refer to

- Hayatullah Khan Durrani (born 1962), Pakistani cave explorer, mountaineer, environmentalist, and rescuer; also a part-time TV sports presenter
- Hayatullah Khan (journalist) (1976–2006), Pakistani journalist
- Hayatullah Khan (comedian) (1955–2025), Pakistani comedian
- Hayatullah (detainee) (born 1979), Afghan detained in Bagram
- Hayatullah (Tehreek-e-Taliban leader), Pakistani politician
- Hayatullah Khan (Taliban leader), Afghan politician
- Hayatullah (Afghan cricketer), Afghan cricketer
- Hayatullah (Pakistani cricketer) (born 2000), Pakistani cricketer
