= Abdul Al-Rahim Ghulam Rabbani =

Pakistani Guantanamo detainee (1969–2024)

Abdul Rahim Ghulam Rabbani
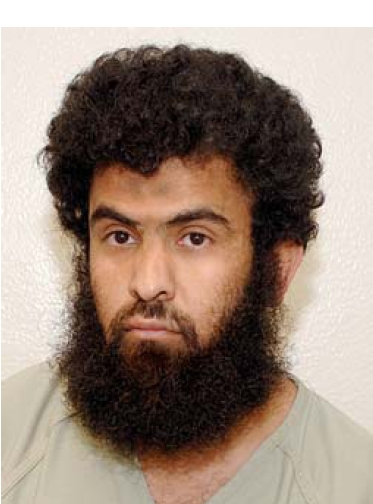
- Born: 1967; Mecca, Saudi Arabia
- Arrested: September 2002; Karachi, Pakistan
- Died: 1 November 2024 (aged 56–57); Karachi, Pakistan
- Detained at: "The salt pit" Guantanamo
- Other name: Abu Rahim Moulana Gulam Rabbani
- ISN: 1460
- Charge(s): No charge, extrajudicial detention
- Status: Released

Abdul Rahim Ghulam Rabbani (1967 - November 1, 2024) was a citizen of Pakistan who was held in the United States Guantanamo Bay detainment camps, in Cuba.

American Intelligence analysts estimated that Rabbani was born in 1967.

Abdul Rahim Ghulam Rabbani arrived at Guantanamo on 19 September 2004, and was held at Guantanamo for over 18 years, until his release on 23 February 2023.

== Detention in "the salt pit" ==
According to Laid Saidi, Rabbani, and his brother, Mohammed Ahmad Ghulam Rabbani, were being held in the CIA black site known as "the salt pit" at the same time as him. He was born in a Pakistani family that migrated from India to Karachi following the partition in 1947. The family lived in Saudi Arabia for many years.

== Official status reviews ==
Originally, the Bush Presidency asserted that captives apprehended in the "war on terror" were not protected by the Geneva Conventions, and could be held indefinitely, without explanation. However, in 2004, the United States Supreme Court ruled, in Rasul v. Bush, that the captives were entitled to hear the allegations that justified their detention, and to try to refute those allegations.

=== Office for the Administrative Review of Detained Enemy Combatants ===
In 2004, in response to the Supreme Court's ruling in Rasul v. Bush, the Department of Defense set up the Office for the Administrative Review of Detained Enemy Combatants. Documents from those reviews were published in response to Freedom of Information Act requests.

Scholars at the Brookings Institution, led by Benjamin Wittes, listed the captives still held in Guantanamo in December 2008, according to whether their detention was justified by certain common allegations:

- Abdul Rahim Ghulam Rabbani was listed as one of the captives who "The military alleges ... are members of Al Qaeda."
- Abdul Rahim Ghulam Rabbani was listed as one of the captives who "The military alleges ... stayed in Al Qaeda, Taliban or other guest- or safehouses."
- Abdul Rahim Ghulam Rabbani was listed as one of the captives who "The military alleges ... took military or terrorist training in Afghanistan."
- Abdul Rahim Ghulam Rabbani was listed as one of the captives who was an "al Qaeda operative".
- Abdul Rahim Ghulam Rabbani was listed as one of the captives who worked directly for "Khalid Sheikh Mohammad".

=== Habeas petition ===
A habeas submission was submitted on his behalf to US District Court Judge Ricardo M. Urbina. In response, on 13 December 2005, the Department of Defense published a fourteen-page dossier of unclassified documents arising from his Combatant Status Review Tribunal.

His Summary of Evidence memo was drafted on 10 November 2004.

The documents indicate a USAF Major, his Personal Representative, recorded on the detainee election form that they met for half an hour on 17 November 2004 to discuss his upcoming Tribunal. His Personal Representative's notes state he chose not to attend his Tribunal.

Tribunal panel 21 convened 23 November 2004 and confirmed his "enemy combatant status". The decision memo drafted by the Tribunal states it reached this conclusion based on classified evidence. Unusually this Tribunal was not convened in Guantanamo, and the Personal Representative who met with him was not present. The Department of Defense has not offered an explanation as to why this Tribunal was not convened in Guantanamo.

His name is spelled both as "Abdul Al-Rahim Ghulam Rabbani" and "Abu Rahim Moulana Gulam Rabbani" in the document.

=== Formerly secret Joint Task Force Guantanamo assessment ===
On 25 April 2011, whistleblower organization WikiLeaks published formerly secret assessments drafted by Joint Task Force Guantanamo analysts. His assessment was twelve pages long, and recommended his continued detention. It was signed by camp commandant David M. Thomas Jr. and was dated 8 June 2008.

== Joint Review Task Force ==
When he assumed office in January 2009 President Barack Obama made a number of promises about the future of Guantanamo. He promised the use of torture would cease at the camp. He promised to institute a new review system. That new review system was composed of officials from six departments, where the OARDEC reviews were conducted entirely by the Department of Defense. When it reported back, a year later, the Joint Review Task Force classified some individuals as too dangerous to be transferred from Guantanamo, even though there was no evidence to justify laying charges against them. On 9 April 2013, that document was made public after a Freedom of Information Act request. Abdul Rahim Ghulam Rabbani was one of the 71 individuals deemed too innocent to charge, but too dangerous to release. Although Obama promised that those deemed too innocent to charge, but too dangerous to release would start to receive reviews from a Periodic Review Board less than a quarter of men have received a review. Rabbani was approved for transfer on 13 May 2021.

== Hunger strike ==
Rabbani and his brother participated in the hunger strike that started on 8 August 2005.

== Release ==
Rabbani and his brother were transferred to Pakistan on 23 February 2023.

== Death ==
Rabbani died of a stomach illness on 1 November 2024.
