= Hayatullah Khan =

Hayatullah Khan may refer to:

- Hayatullah Khan Durrani (born 1962), Pakistani cave explorer and mountaineer
- Mirawas (born Hayatullah Khan; 1955–2025), Pakistani stand up comedian and singer
- Hayatullah Khan (Taliban leader) (born 1972), Taliban leader and spokesmen
- Hayatullah Khan (journalist) (1976–2006), Pakistani journalist
