= Khalid El-Masri =

German torture victim (born 1963)

Khaled El-Masri
- Born: 29 June 1963 (age 63); Kuwait
- Other name: Khaled Masri
- Children: 6

Khaled El-Masri (also Khalid El-Masri and Khaled Masri, Levantine Arabic pronunciation: [ˈxaːlɪd elˈmɑsˤɾi, -ˈmɑsˤɾe], Arabic: خالد المصري; born 29 June 1963) is a German, Lebanese and French citizen who was mistakenly abducted by the Macedonian police in 2003, and handed over to the U.S. Central Intelligence Agency (CIA). While in CIA custody, he was flown to Afghanistan, where he was held at a black site and routinely interrogated, beaten, strip-searched, raped, and subjected to other forms of torture. After El-Masri held hunger strikes, and was detained for four months in the "Salt Pit", the CIA admitted his arrest was a mistake and released him. He is believed to be among an estimated 3,000 detainees whom the CIA captured from 2001 to 2005, in its campaign to dismantle terrorist networks.

In May 2004, the U.S. Ambassador to Germany, Daniel R. Coats, convinced the German interior minister, Otto Schily, not to press charges or to reveal the program. El-Masri filed suit against the CIA for his arrest, extraordinary rendition and torture. In 2006, his suit El Masri v. Tenet, in which he was represented by the American Civil Liberties Union (ACLU), was dismissed by the United States District Court for the Eastern District of Virginia, based on the U.S. government's claiming the state secrets privilege. The ACLU said the Bush administration attempted to shield its abuses by invoking this privilege. The case was also dismissed by the Appeals Court for the Fourth Circuit, and in December 2007, the United States Supreme Court declined to hear the case.

On 13 December 2012, El-Masri won an Article 34 case at the European Court of Human Rights in Strasbourg. The court determined he had been tortured while held by CIA agents and ruled that Macedonia was responsible for abusing him while in the country, and knowingly transferring him to the CIA when torture was a possibility. It awarded him compensation. This marked the first time that CIA activities against detainees was legally declared as torture. The European Court condemned nations for collaborating with the United States in these secret programs.

== Personal history ==
El-Masri was born in Kuwait to Lebanese parents. He grew up in Lebanon.

He immigrated to France in the 1980s during the Lebanese civil war, where he applied for political asylum, based on his membership in the Islamic Unification Movement which had fought against the Lebanese government during the war years. In 1988 he obtained French citizenship. He then later moved to Germany. He was granted asylum in 1990. In 1994 he obtained German citizenship through a previous marriage with a German woman, whom he later divorced. In 1996, El-Masri married a Lebanese woman in Ulm, Germany. They have had five children together.

== Abduction and CIA torture in Macedonia ==
At the end of 2003, El-Masri travelled from his home in Ulm to go on a short vacation in Skopje. He was detained by Macedonian border officials on 31 December 2003, because his name was identical (except for variations in Roman transliteration) to that of Khalid al-Masri, who was being sought as an alleged mentor to the al-Qaeda Hamburg cell, and because of suspicion that El-Masri's German passport was a forgery. He was held in a motel in Macedonia for over three weeks and questioned about his activities, his associates, and the mosque he attended in Ulm.

The Macedonian authorities contacted the local CIA station, who in turn contacted the agency's headquarters in Langley, Virginia. According to a 4 December 2005 article in the Washington Post, CIA agents discussed whether to remove El-Masri from Macedonia through an extraordinary rendition. The decision to do so was made by the head of the al Qaeda division of the CIA's Counter-Terrorism Center, Alfreda Frances Bikowsky, on the basis of "a hunch" that El-Masri was involved in terrorism; his name was similar to suspected terrorist Khalid al-Masri.

When the Macedonian officials released El-Masri on 23 January 2004, American security officers immediately kidnapped him. El-Masri later described them as members of a "black snatch team." They beat him and sedated him for transport using a rectal suppository. "The CIA stripped, hooded, shackled and sodomized el-Masri with a suppository—in CIA parlance, subjected him to "capture shock"—as Macedonian officials stood by." He was dressed in a diaper and a jumpsuit, with total sensory deprivation, and flown to Baghdad, then immediately to the "Salt Pit", a black site or covert CIA interrogation center, in Afghanistan. It also held CIA prisoners from Pakistan, Tanzania, Yemen and Saudi Arabia.

== 'Salt Pit' in Afghanistan ==
After his release, in 2006 El-Masri wrote in the Los Angeles Times that, while held by the CIA in Afghanistan, he was beaten and repeatedly interrogated. He also said that his custodians forcibly inserted an object into his anus. He was kept in a bare, squalid cell, given only meager rations to eat and putrid water to drink.

According to a report by the inspector general of the CIA, El-Masri's German passport was not examined for authenticity until three months into his detention. Upon examination, the CIA's Office of Technical Services swiftly concluded it was genuine and that his continued detention would be unjustified. Discussion over what to do with El-Masri included secretly transporting him back to Macedonia and dumping him there without informing German authorities, and denying any claims he made.

In March 2004, El-Masri took part in a hunger strike, demanding that his captors afford him due process or watch him die. After 27 days without eating, he forced a meeting with the prison director and a CIA officer known as "The Boss". They conceded he should not be imprisoned but refused to release him. El-Masri continued his hunger strike for 10 more days until he was force-fed and given medical attention. He had lost more than 60 pounds (27 kg) since his abduction in Skopje.

While imprisoned in Afghanistan, Masri befriended several other detainees. The men memorized each other's telephone numbers so that if one was released, he could contact the families of the others. According to the New York Times, Laid Saidi, an Algerian who was a former detainee, was released in 2006. His description of his abduction and detention closely matched that of El-Masri.

El-Masri reports that Majid Khan, characterized by the Bush administration as a high-value detainee, was held in the Salt Pit at the same time as he was. Khan, a former resident of Catonsville, Maryland, US was held by the CIA for an additional three and a half years prior to being transferred to US military custody and Guantanamo on 5 September 2006.

== Release ==
In April 2004, CIA Director George Tenet was told by his staff that El-Masri was being wrongfully detained. National Security Adviser Condoleezza Rice learned of the German citizen's detention in early May and ordered his release. Shortly before El-Masri was released, in May 2004 the US ambassador to Germany informed the government for the first time of his detention. The ambassador asked the interior minister Otto Schily not to disclose the events, as the US feared "exposure of a covert action program designed to capture terrorism suspects abroad and transfer them among countries, and possible legal challenges to the CIA from Mr Masri and others with similar allegations." El-Masri was released on 28 May 2004 following a second order from Rice.

The CIA flew El-Masri out of Afghanistan and released him at night on a desolate road in Albania, without an apology or funds to return home. He later said that, at the time he believed his release was a ruse, and he would be executed. He was intercepted by Albanian guards, who believed him to be a terrorist due to his haggard and unkempt appearance. He was returned to Germany. It took time for him to be reunited with his wife; with no word of him for so long, she thought he had abandoned her and their family, and returned with their children to her family in Lebanon.

In 2005, a German prosecutor started aiding El-Masri to validate his case. Using isotope analysis, scientists at the Bavarian archive for geology in Munich analyzed his hair; they verified that he was malnourished during his disappearance.

== Timeline of investigation and aftermath ==
- On 9 January 2005, The New York Times journalists Don van Natta and Souad Mekhennet broke the story about the El-Masri case after months of research.
- Van Natta and Mekhennet also worked on follow-up stories about the involvement of German and Macedonian authorities. Mekhennet later travelled to Algeria and other countries and interviewed prisoners who had been held with El-Masri.
- A 9 November 2005 Reuters story stated that a German prosecutor is investigating El-Masri's kidnapping "by persons unknown", and that another lawyer, Manfred Gnjidic, would be flying to the U.S. to file a civil compensation suit. It noted that US authorities neither confirmed nor denied any element of El-Masri's story.
- According to a 4 December 2005 article in The Washington Post, the CIA's Inspector General was investigating a series of "erroneous renditions", including El-Masri's. The article was by Dana Priest, the journalist who broke the story on the covert interrogation centers known as the "black sites".
- On 5 December 2005, German Chancellor Angela Merkel said that the United States had acknowledged holding El-Masri in error.
- On 6 December 2005, the American Civil Liberties Union helped El-Masri file suit in the US against former CIA director George Tenet and the owners of the private jets, leased to the US government, that the CIA used to transport him. El-Masri had to participate via a video link because the American authorities had denied him entry when his plane landed in the United States. Some press reports attributed the Americans barring him entry due to his name remaining on the watch list and being confused with Khalid al-Masri. But his lawyer, Manfred Gnjidic, was also barred entry.
- On 17 December 2005, Front magazine reported that a member of a German Intelligence Agency had clandestinely passed a copy of El-Masri's dossier to the CIA in April 2004.
- In December 2005, El-Masri published a first-person account of his experience in the Los Angeles Times.
- Time magazine reported on 2 March 2006 that El-Masri may have been a leader of a radical, Lebanese Sunni islamist group ideologically affiliated with the Muslim brotherhood called "el-Tawhid" in the early 1980s, which fought Alawites in Tripoli during the Lebanese Civil War. The description of the group fits the Islamic Unification Movement, also known simply as "Tawhid". German reports assert that El-Masri reported being a member of El-Tawhid (also spelled Al-Tawhid when he applied to Germany for refugee status, in 1985.
- On 18 May 2006, U.S. Federal District Judge T.S. Ellis, III dismissed a lawsuit El-Masri filed against the CIA and three private companies allegedly involved with his transport, based on the government's position that it would "present a grave risk of injury to national security." (This legal doctrine is known as the state secrets privilege. Ellis said that if Masri's allegations were true, he deserved compensation from the US government.)
- The BND (German intelligence agency) declared on 1 June 2006 that it had known of El-Masri's seizure 16 months before the German government was officially informed in May 2004 of his mistaken arrest. Germany had previously claimed that it did not know of El-Masri's abduction until his return to the country in May 2004.
- On 26 July 2006, the ACLU announced that "it will appeal the recent dismissal of a lawsuit brought by Khaled El-Masri against the US government." According to the ACLU attorney Ben Wizner, "If this decision stands, the government will have a blank check to shield even its most shameful conduct from accountability."
- In September 2006, a German public TV program revealed the names the pilots of the El-Masri rendition flight as Eric Robert Hume (alias Eric Matthew Fain), James Kovalesky and Harry Kirk Elarbee.
- On 4 October 2006, The Washington Post reported that Munich prosecutors were complaining that a lack of cooperation from US authorities was impeding their investigation into El-Masri's abduction. The article reported that Munich prosecutors have a list of the names, or known aliases, of 20 CIA operatives who they believe played a role in the abduction.
- On 31 January 2007, Munich Prosecutor Christian Schmidt-Sommerfeld announced that warrants for 13 people were issued for suspected involvement in El-Masri's rendition.
- According to a leaked US cable, on February 6, 2007, U.S. officials warned the German government not to issue international warrants, saying such action could adversely affect relations between the two countries.
- On 21 February 2007, the German Government decided to pass the warrants to Interpol.
- On 2 March 2007, the United States Court of Appeals for the Fourth Circuit affirmed the dismissal of El-Masri v. Tenet.
- On 30 April 2007, the Federal Constitutional Court of Germany ruled as unconstitutional the tapping of the phones of El-Masri's lawyer by Munich's DA office. The DA had requested the tapping, claiming they expected the CIA to contact the lawyer "to find a solution to the case".
- In June 2007, the ACLU filed a petition for certiorari at the U.S. Supreme Court to have El-Masri's suit heard.
- On 12 July 2007, the European Parliament issued the 2006 Progress Report on the Former Yugoslav Republic of Macedonia, in which the authorities of Macedonia were urged to cooperate in the investigation of the abduction.
- In July 2007, the CIA prepared an internal report examining the CIA's handling of El-Masri, stating "The report notes that all agency attorneys interviewed agreed that Masri did not meet the legal standard for rendition and detention, which required that a suspect be deemed a threat."
- In September 2007, the German Government decided not to ask the US officially for extradition of CIA personnel associated with El-Masri's abduction, as an unofficial request had been denied.
- On 5 September 2007, the Constitution Project filed an amicus curiae, a legal brief in support of El-Masri's petition for certiorari.
- On 9 October 2007, the ACLU petition was declined for hearing by the U.S. Supreme Court, without comment.
- On 10 June 2008, German and US civil rights lawyers representing El-Masri filed a new civil suit, seeking to force the German government to reconsider the extradition requests it issued in January 2007.
- In May 2009, prosecutors attached to the Spanish National Court asked for an arrest order for thirteen CIA agents involved in the kidnapping.
- On 4 March 2010, in a written statement, former Macedonian Interior Minister Hari Kostov confirmed that El-Masri was arrested by the Macedonian security authorities, held in Skopje without contact to the outside world under the supervision of intelligence officials, and was later handed over to a CIA team.
- In May 2012, the European Court of Human Rights held a hearing on the case between El-Masri and the Former Yugoslav Republic of Macedonia (application number 39630/09)), in which he had filed for damages for suffering due to treatment in Macedonian custody and for being handed over to the CIA.
- On 13 December 2012, the Grand Chamber of the European Court of Human Rights ruled that El-Masri's account was established beyond a reasonable doubt, and that "Macedonia was "responsible for his torture and ill-treatment" both in the country and after turning him over to US authorities." It awarded him compensation of 60,000 euros for his abuse.
- In June 2016, a redacted version of the July 2007 internal CIA report was obtained by the ACLU under the FOIA.
- In a letter dated on 28 March 2018 Macedonia's Minister of Foreign Affairs Nikola Dimitrov expressed his “sincere apologies and unreserved regrets” for what he described as the “improper conduct of our authorities” in 2004.

== Other legal troubles ==
On 17 May 2007, El-Masri was arrested on suspicion of arson. According to Die Welt Online, the problem arose over a dispute over an iPod that El-Masri had bought at a METRO warehouse club store back in April in the Bavarian city of Neu-Ulm. He claimed the iPod malfunctioned just hours after purchase. When he tried to return it, the store refused, and the situation escalated into a shouting match. El-Masri spat in the face of a female employee, and was barred from the store. On 17 May 2007, El-Masri kicked in a door of the Metro store and used gasoline to start a fire. The fire caused almost €90,000 in damages. Nobody was hurt. El-Masri was arrested near the scene of the crime. After arrest, a judge ordered him held in a psychiatric hospital. On 18 May, El-Masri's attorney, Manfred Gnjidic, conceded his client did set fire to the store, but blamed it on his client's torture experiences and claimed that the German government did not provide enough therapy to him after his return from Afghanistan. He had actually requested extended therapy for his client shortly before the incident, as El-Masri stated he felt threatened, and believed himself to be pursued by cars and strangers. He stated the act of arson was executed on impulse and could not have led to a larger fire. While the courts recognized that El-Masri had never breached the law before his CIA abduction, and ruled that he had been traumatized, they also stated that this did not now justify acts of violence. He received a suspended sentence.

Prosecutors in the arson case also revealed that El-Masri faced charges for allegedly attacking a truck driving instructor. They said El-Masri lost his temper after the instructor criticized him for failing to attend his lessons.

On 11 September 2009, El-Masri was arrested after attacking Gerold Noerenberg, the mayor of Neu-Ulm. Shortly before the attack El-Masri tried to meet Noerenberg, but was prevented from entering the office and sent off by the police. He then took three of his six children with him, stormed the office and struck Noerenberg repeatedly in the face and threw a chair at him. He was arrested two hours after the attack in Senden. He confessed the attack, but kept silent about the motives at the time. Writing from his cell, he complained about the increasing licensing of brothels by the city, one of which he said desecrated a Muslim prayer room. He was sentenced to two years' imprisonment on 30 March 2010. Manfred Gnjidic explained that El-Masri believed he was pursued by the secret services, trying to break or recruit him, and he intended to file an appeal.

== European Court of Human Rights ==
El-Masri filed a complaint against the Macedonian government asking for damages for his "suffering, anguish and mental breakdown", due to his mistaken arrest, torture and abuse after being transferred to CIA custody.

On December 13, 2012, the Grand Chamber for the European Court of Human Rights issued a ruling, finding that El-Masri's account of his abduction, rendition and torture "was established beyond reasonable doubt" and that Macedonia "had been responsible for his torture and ill-treatment both in the country itself and after his transfer to the U.S. authorities in the context of an extra-judicial rendition." It awarded El-Masri 60,000 Euros in compensation. The Court termed El-Masri's abduction, detention and torture in Macedonia, and subsequent rendition to Afghanistan, a forced disappearance. The Court stated that El-Masri's allegations were supported by previous investigations into flight logs, as well as forensic evidence about his physical condition.

This was the first time that a court had found in favor of El-Masri since his release by the CIA. In a statement before the Grand Chamber, the Open Society Institute, which had prosecuted the case, called upon the United States to apologize to El-Masri. James Goldston, executive director of the Open Society Justice Initiative, said:

For Mr. El-Masri, the most important thing that he was hoping for was to have the European court officially acknowledge what he did and say that what he's been claiming is in fact true and it was in fact a breach of the law. ... It's an extraordinary ruling.

Goldston also said, the court's ruling was "a comprehensive condemnation of the worst aspects of the post-9/11 war-on-terror tactics that were employed by the CIA and governments who cooperated with them."

== See also ==
- Extrajudicial prisoners of the United States
- Ghost detainee
- Forced disappearance
- List of kidnappings (2000–2009)
- State secrets privilege
- Rendition (film)

Similar cases:

- Hassan Mustafa Osama Nasr
- Laid Saidi
- Maher Arar
- Mohammed Haydar Zammar
- Mamdouh Habib
