= Ghairat Baheer =

Afghan public servant

- Born: 1956 (age 69–70); Chanakhwa, Paktika
- Arrested: 2002; Islamabad, Pakistan
- Citizenship: Afghanistan
- Detained at: the salt pit, BTIF
- Alleged to be a member of: Hezbi Islami Gulbuddin
- Status: released
- Occupation: Senator in the House of Elders - Afghanistan

Ghairat Baheer is a citizen of Afghanistan who served as a Senator in the House of Elders of Afghanistan. He is also the Chairman of the Political Committee of Hezbi Islami in Afghanistan. Ghairat Baheer was held by American forces in extrajudicial detention for over six years. According to BBC News, Pakistani officials took him into custody during a pre-dawn raid on his home in Islamabad on October 30, 2002. The BBC said no reason was offered for his apprehension, and that there were rumors US security officials participated in the raid.

After his release in May 2008, Baheer asserted he had spent six months in the salt pit, one of the Central Intelligence Agency's network of clandestine interrogation centers. He spent the rest of his detention in the Bagram Theater Internment Facility in Afghanistan.

According to the Associated Press, Baheer is a medical doctor, a son-in-law of Gulbuddin Hekmatyar, the leader of the Hezbi Islami Gulbuddin previously a militant group, and he was captured with Gul Rahman, the only captive the CIA has acknowledged died in captivity. In 2010, Baheer was a member of the Hezbi Islami Gulbuddin peace delegation to peace talks.

In an interview with the German news agency DPA Bahir said he spent most of his six years in captivity in chains, bombarded with disorienting music so loud his guards wore hearing protection. He said they were fed an inadequate quantity of food, and he lost 40 kilograms, and he still hadn't fully recovered his strength.

In 2012 he served as the HiG's main negotiator with the United States.

David Loyn, of the BBC News, quoting sources close to new President of Afghanistan Ashraf Ghani, reported that Ghairat Baheer had been offered a position in his new cabinet. Baheer, former Taliban Minister of Foreign Affairs, Wakil Ahmad Muttawakil, and former Taliban Ambassador to Pakistan Abdul Salem Zaeef, were offered the Ministries of Minister of Rural Affairs, Minister of Border Affairs and Minister of Religious Affairs.

On June 14, 2018, Baheer addressed 180 members of the Hezbi Islami Party, who had just been released from prison, following the peace negotiations he had helped lead. He urged the men, on behalf of the party, to be peaceful, law-abiding citizens.

Ghairat Baheer was sworn in as a Senator and a member of the House of Elders on September 16, 2018. He was selected for the senate as part of the one third members that the President is entitled to appoint. He is also currently the Chairman of the Political Committee of Hezbi Islami in Afghanistan.
