= Attash =

Attash may refer to:

- Abd al-Malik ibn Attash, Fatimid da'i involved in Muhammad Tapar's anti-Nizari campaign
- Attash Durrani (1952–2018), Pakistani writer
- Hassan bin Attash (born 1985), Juvenile held at Guantanamo Bay
- Walid bin Attash (born 1978), Yemeni prisoner
- Attash v. Bush, Habeas corpus petition
