= Tariq Mahmood =

Tariq Mahmood or Mehmood may refer to:

- Tariq Mahmood (cricketer)
- Tariq Mahmood (detainee)
- Tariq Mahmood (judge)
- Tariq Mehmood, Pakistani military officer
