= Gul Rahman =

Afghan victim of CIA torture

- Photo of Gul Rahman, released by his family
- Arrested: October 2002; Pakistan
- Died: 20 November 2002 the Salt Pit
- Citizenship: Afghanistan
- Detained at: Salt Pit
- Charge: No charge
- Status: Death by torture in a secret CIA facility
- Occupation: Detainee of DOD

Gul Rahman (Pashto: ګل رحمان; died November 20, 2002) was an Afghan man, suspected by the United States of being a militant, who was a victim of torture. He died in a secret CIA prison, or black site, located in northern Kabul, Afghanistan, known as the Salt Pit. He had been captured October 29, 2002.

His name was kept secret by the United States for more than seven years, although his death was announced. In 2010 the Associated Press reported that before his death he was left half-stripped and chained against a concrete wall on a night when the temperature was close to freezing. The United States government did not notify his family (wife and four daughters) of his death, according to the report.

== Capture and death ==
Gul Rahman was captured and arrested on October 29, 2002, during a joint operation by U.S. agents and Pakistani security forces against Hezb-e-Islami Gulbuddin. He was reportedly arrested with the physician Ghairat Baheer, the son-in-law of the warlord Gulbuddin Hekmatyar, who led the insurgent faction Hezb-e-Islami. Rahman had traveled from Peshawar to Islamabad, Pakistan, for a medical checkup when he was arrested at the home of Ghairat Baheer, and subsequently flown by the CIA to Afghanistan.

U.S. officials claim Rahman was "violently uncooperative" while in custody at the Salt Pit, the CIA code name for an abandoned brick factory that had been turned into a CIA black site or covert interrogation center, including threatening to kill his guards – who responded by beating him. Rahman was also subjected to "48 hours of sleep deprivation, auditory overload, total darkness, isolation, a cold shower and rough treatment". Gul Rahman reportedly died on November 20, 2002, after being stripped naked from the waist down and shackled to a cold cement wall in the Salt Pit, where temperatures were approximately 36 °F (2 °C).

This technique of shackling is known as "short-chaining." The detainee is shackled "in a short chain position, which prevents prisoners from standing upright." A CIA pathologist reported that Rahman likely froze to death.

His death prompted an internal CIA review and the development of improved guidance. No one was ever charged in his death.

== Rescue of Hamid Karzai ==
Redacted version of the CIA investigation of Rahman's death, released June 2016 (.pdf file)

According to Gul's brother, Habib Rahman, Gul Rahman was involved in a 1994 rescue of Hamid Karzai, the president of Afghanistan from 2001 to 2014. Karzai had been imprisoned by the government forces, and Rahman was working for Hekmatyar, whose forces fired rockets at the building while Rahman entered and freed Karzai. Rahman took him to a safe house in Kabul.

== Senate Intelligence Committee's report of CIA torture ==
On December 9, 2014, the Senate Intelligence Committee report on CIA torture was published. According to that report he had been subjected to total darkness, sensory overload, sleep deprivation, cold shower, rough treatment, short shackling, and finally froze to death. The report said he was the only captive known to have died in CIA custody.

On October 13, 2015, the American Civil Liberties Union filed a lawsuit on behalf of Rahman's estate and two other former detainees against two psychologists, James Mitchell and Bruce Jessen, who they maintain were responsible for designing the protocols that resulted in Rahman's death and the torture of the other two plaintiffs. The ACLU case is the first lawsuit brought against significant individuals identified in the Senate report since it was published. On July 28, 2017, U.S. district judge Justin Lowe Quackenbush denied both parties' motions for summary judgment, noted that the defendants are indemnified by the United States government, and encouraged the attorneys to reach a settlement before trial.

== See also ==
- Mohammed Ahmad Ghulam Rabbani
- Lufti Al-Arabi Al-Gharisi
- Abd al-Rahim al-Nashiri
