= Manfred Gnjidic =

Manfred Gnjidic (April 22, 1964 – September 27, 2023) was a lawyer in Germany. In 2004 he was employed by Khalid El-Masri, a German citizen who was subjected to extraordinary rendition by the CIA in the years past. Gnjidic helped El-Masri launch a lawsuit against George Tenet and other Americans he alleges were involved in his rendition.

On December 8, 2005, following a meeting with United States Secretary of State Condoleezza Rice, German Chancellor Angela Merkel announced that Dr Rice had privately acknowledged that El-Masri had been captured and transported in error. Rice then offered her account, that she had merely acknowledged that the United States had made some errors, without acknowledging that El-Masri's rendition was an instance of those errors.

Gnjidic has announced his intention to subpoena Merkel to testify in El-Masri's lawsuit.

He also represents Aleem Nasir, a German citizen interrogated by Pakistani, American and British intelligence agents during a two-month-long extrajudicial detention in Pakistan. Gnjidic is investigating whether information gained under coercion during these interrogations may have been used to initiate a German investigation of Nasir.
