= Bukit Pasir (state constituency) =

Political subdivision in Malaysia

Bukit Pasir (N08)
Johor constituency

State constituency
- Legislature: Johor State Legislative Assembly
MLA
Mohamad Fazli Mohamad Salleh
BN
- Constituency created: 2018
- First contested: 2018
- Last contested: 2026

Demographics
- Population (2020): 60,532
- Electors (2026): 34,142
- Area (km²): 235

Bukit Pasir is a state constituency in Johor, Malaysia, that has been represented in the Johor State Legislative Assembly.

The state constituency was first contested in 2018 and is mandated to return a single Assemblyman to the Johor State Legislative Assembly under the first-past-the-post voting system.

== Demographics ==
As of 2020, Bukit Pasir has a population of 60,532 people.

Ethnic breakdown of Bukit Pasir's electorate as of 2026
1. Malay (62.7%)
2. Chinese (32.5%)
3. Indian (4.10%)
4. Other ethnicities (0.70%)

== History ==
=== Polling districts ===
According to the federal gazette issued on 2 July 2026, the Bukit Pasir constituency has a total of 20 polling districts.

State constituency	Polling Districts	Code	Location
Bukit Pasir (N08）	Samasih	143/08/01	SK Semaseh
Bukit Pasir (N08）	Kampong Raja	143/08/02	SK Kampong Raja
Bukit Pasir (N08）	Panchor	143/08/03	SK Kota Raja
Bukit Pasir (N08）	Bandar Panchor	143/08/04	SJK (C) Ai Hwa
Bukit Pasir (N08）	Kampong Jawa	143/08/05	SK Panchor
Bukit Pasir (N08）	Jorak	143/08/06	SK Jorak
Bukit Pasir (N08）	Tanjong Selabu	143/08/07	SJK (C) Wee Sin
Bukit Pasir (N08）	Pergam	143/08/08	Balai Raya Kampung Pergam
Bukit Pasir (N08）	Temiang	143/08/09	SK Temiang
Bukit Pasir (N08）	Sungai Terap	143/08/10	Ma'had Tahfiz Al-Quran Al-Muttaqin
Bukit Pasir (N08）	Sungai Raya	143/08/11	SK Sungai Raya
Bukit Pasir (N08）	Kampong Tengah	143/08/12	Balai Raya Kampung Tengah
Bukit Pasir (N08）	Permatang Pasir	143/08/13	SK Sri Bukit Pasir
Bukit Pasir (N08）	Pekan Bukit Pasir Barat	143/08/14	SJK (C) Yu Jern
Bukit Pasir (N08）	Pekan Bukit Pasir Utara	143/08/15	SMK Bukit Pasir
Bukit Pasir (N08）	Pekan Bukit Pasir Selatan	143/08/16	SJK (T) Ladang Temiang Renchong
Bukit Pasir (N08）	Bukit Pasir	143/08/17	SK Paya Panjang
Bukit Pasir (N08）	Ladang Craigielea	143/08/18	SJK (C) Kim Kee
Bukit Pasir (N08）	Panjang Sari	143/08/19	SK Panjang Sari
Bukit Pasir (N08）	Bukit Treh	143/08/20	SJK (C) Aik Ming

=== Representation history ===
Members of the Legislative Assembly for Bukit Pasir
Assembly	No	Years	Member	Party
Constituency created from Jorak
14th	N08	2018–2020	Najib Lep	PAS
14th	N08	2020–2022	Najib Lep	PN (PAS)
15th	N08	2022–2026	Mohamad Fazli Mohamad Salleh	BN (UMNO)
16th	N08	2026–present	Mohamad Fazli Mohamad Salleh	BN (UMNO)

== Election results ==
Johor state election, 2026
Party	Candidate	Votes	%	∆%
BN	Fazli Salleh	14,220	57.54	▲25.43
PH	Najib Lep	6,620	26.79	▲1.97
PN	Idzhar Nasirruddin	3,872	15.67	▼15.39
Total valid votes		24,712	100.00	
Total rejected ballots		224		
Unreturned ballots		0		
Turnout		24,936	73.04	▲13.18
Registered electors		34,142		
Majority		7,600	30.75	▲29.70
BN hold		Swing		?

Johor state election, 2022
Party	Candidate	Votes	%	∆%
BN	Fazli Salleh	6,048	32.11	▼12.60
PN	Iqbal Razak	5,850	31.06	▲31.06
PH	Elia Nadira	4,676	24.82	▲24.82
Independent	Najib Lep	1,860	9.87	▲9.87
Independent	Johar Siraj	207	1.10	▲1.10
PEJUANG	Mohd Akhiri Mahmood	196	1.04	▲1.04
Total valid votes		18,837	100.00	
Total rejected ballots		381		
Unreturned ballots		63		
Turnout		19,281	59.85	▼25.87
Registered electors		32,213		
Majority		198	1.05	▼9.53
BN gain from PAS		Swing		?

Johor state election, 2018
Party	Candidate	Votes	%
PAS	Najib Lep	9,835	55.29
BN	Noriah Mahat	7,952	44.71
Total valid votes		17,787	100.00
Total rejected ballots		1,382	
Unreturned ballots		0	
Turnout		19,305	85.72
Registered electors		22,520	
Majority		1,883	10.58
This was a new constituency created
