= Mohammed Ahmad Ghulam Rabbani =

Pakistani Guantanamo bay detainee

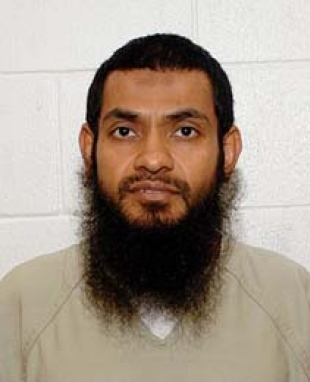
- Mohammed Ahmad Ghulam Rabbani
- Born: October 1969 (age 57); Medina, Saudi Arabia
- Arrested: September 2002; Karachi, Pakistan
- Detained at: "the salt pit" Guantanamo
- ISN: 1461
- Charge: extrajudicial detention
- Status: Released
- Children: 1

Mohammed Ahmad Ghulam Rabbani is a citizen of Pakistan who was extrajudicially detained by the United States military at the Guantanamo Bay detention camp in Cuba from 2004 to 2023. He was never charged with a crime, was never tried, and was a subject of enhanced interrogation techniques.

American Intelligence analysts estimated that Rabbani was born in 1969, in Medina, Saudi Arabia.

Mohammed Ahmad Ghulam Rabbani arrived at Guantanamo on September 19, 2004, and was held there for over 18 years, until his release on February 23, 2023. He had spent approximately two years in the CIA's network of secret black site camps, prior to his transfer to Guantanamo.

== Background ==
Rabbani was born in Saudi Arabia to a Pakistani family who had migrated to Karachi from India during the partition in 1947. He learned to speak Arabic while growing up in Saudi Arabia. Rabbani eventually moved back to Karachi where he worked as a taxi driver during the 1990s. Due to his fluency in Arabic, his clientele included Arabs visiting the city, and he became a referred driver and guide for them. He married in 2001 and had a son, whom he has never seen and only came to learn of during custody, when his son was six years old. Rabbani has written that he was handed over to American authorities because his crime was that he "spoke Arabic" and that he was accused of being one of them. He has also written on the torture he has endured during captivity in Afghanistan and Guantanamo.

== CIA black site detention ==
According to Laid Saidi, Rabbani, and his brother, Abdul Al-Rahim Ghulam Rabbani, were being held in the CIA black site known as "the salt pit" at the same time as him. According to the Senate Intelligence Committee report on CIA torture, Rabbani was tortured for two years by the CIA. According to the report, he had been trained in a militant camp in Khost in 1994 for seven months, and then at the Khaldan Training camp for two months. Imprisoned in Pakistan for two years — 1995-96 — and that in 1997, he met Osama bin Laden and became a travel facilitator for Al Qaeda. According to his file, he worked directly for Al Qaeda operational planner, Khalid Sheikh Mohammad.

== Official status reviews ==
Originally, the Bush Presidency asserted that captives apprehended in the "war on terror" were not protected by the Geneva Conventions, and could be held indefinitely, without explanation. However, in 2004, the United States Supreme Court ruled, in Rasul v. Bush, that the captives were entitled to hear the allegations that justified their detention, and to try to refute those allegations.

=== Office for the Administrative Review of Detained Enemy Combatants ===
In 2004, in response to the Supreme Court's ruling in Rasul v. Bush, the Department of Defense set up the Office for the Administrative Review of Detained Enemy Combatants. Documents from those reviews were published in response to Freedom of Information Act requests.

Scholars at the Brookings Institution, led by Benjamin Wittes, listed the captives still held in Guantanamo in December 2008, according to whether their detention was justified by certain common allegations:

- Mohammed Ahmad Ghulam Rabbani was listed as one of the captives who "The military alleges ... are members of Al Qaeda."
- Mohammed Ahmad Ghulam Rabbani was listed as one of the captives who "The military alleges ... stayed in Al Qaeda, Taliban or other guest- or safehouses."
- Mohammed Ahmad Ghulam Rabbani was listed as one of the captives who "The military alleges ... took military or terrorist training in Afghanistan."
- Mohammed Ahmad Ghulam Rabbani was listed as one of the captives who was an "al Qaeda operative".
- Mohammed Ahmad Ghulam Rabbani was listed as one of the "82 detainees made no statement to CSRT or ARB tribunals or made statements that do not bear materially on the military’s allegations against them."

=== Habeas petition ===
A habeas petition was submitted on Rabbani's behalf to US District Court Judge Ricardo M. Urbina. In response, on December 14, 2005, the Department of Defense published a thirteen-page dossier of unclassified documents arising from his Combatant Status Review Tribunal.

His Summary of Evidence memo was drafted on November 9, 2004.

The documents indicate a Lieutenant Commander, his Personal Representative, recorded on the detainee election form that they met, for eighty minutes, on 13 November 2004, to discuss his upcoming Tribunal. His Personal Representative's notes state simply that he chose not to attend his Tribunal.

Tribunal Panel 21 convened 17 November 2004 and confirmed his "enemy combatant status". The decision memo drafted by the Tribunal states it reached this conclusion based on classified evidence. His brother's status was also confirmed by Tribunal panel 21, on 23 November 2004. The notes in his case state his Tribunal did not convene in Guantanamo.

=== Formerly secret Joint Task Force Guantanamo assessment ===
His assessment was eleven pages long, and recommended his continued detention. It was signed by camp commandant David M. Thomas Jr. and was dated May 28, 2008.

=== Joint Review Task Force ===
When he assumed office in January 2009 President Barack Obama made a number of promises about the future of Guantanamo. He promised the use of torture would cease at the camp. He promised to institute a new review system. That new review system was composed of officials from six departments, where the OARDEC reviews were conducted entirely by the Department of Defense. When it reported back, a year later, the Joint Review Task Force classified some individuals as too dangerous to be transferred from Guantanamo, even though there was no evidence to justify laying charges against them. On April 9, 2013, that document was made public after a Freedom of Information Act request. Mohammed Ahmad Ghulam Rabbani was one of the 71 individuals deemed too innocent to charge, but too dangerous to release. Although Obama promised that those deemed too innocent to charge, but too dangerous to release would start to receive reviews from a Periodic Review Board less than a quarter of men have received a review. Rabbani was approved for transfer on October 7, 2021.

== Hunger strike ==
Rabbani and his brother participated in the hunger strike that started on August 8, 2005.

== Named by the US Senate as one of the CIA's captives subjected to torture, without authorization ==
On December 9, 2014, the United States Senate Intelligence Committee published the 600-page unclassified summary of a 6,000-page report on the CIA's use of torture. While some of the CIA's captives were identified as only been subjected to torture that had been authorized from Washington, other captives, like Rabbani, were identified as having been tortured by CIA officials who did not have authorization. According to the Intelligence Committee, Rabbani "Subjected to forced standing, attention grasps, and cold temperatures without blankets in November 2002."

== Los Angeles Times op-ed ==
The Los Angeles Times published an op-ed from Rabbani, on July 25, 2018. In the op-ed Rabbani says he had been extensively tortured. In the op-ed Rabbani maintained he had been a mere taxi driver.

Rabbani said that his weight was down to just 95 pounds (43 kg). He said he had engaged in hunger strikes, to peacefully protest the injustice of his detention, his current weight loss was due to an inability to take in solid food. He said that the prison's head doctor had directed that he should be allowed the foods he said he could digest, but that camp guards insisted on ignoring these directions, and subjecting him to force-feeding ensure, through a nose-tube, while locked in a "restraint chair".

Rabbani said he was held in "the dark prison". He identified himself as the previously unidentified individual who found being suspended by the wrists so painful he had tried to amputate his own hands.

== Release ==
Rabbani and his brother were transferred to Pakistan on February 23, 2023.
