= Lufti Al-Arabi Al-Gharisi =

Citizen of Tunisia held in extra-judicial detention by the United States

Lutfi al-Arabi al-Gharisi
- Arrested: 2002; Peshawar, Pakistan
- Detained at: CIA black sites, the dark prison, Bagram
- Other names: Abou Hudeifa; Abou Houdayfa
- ISN: 1209
- Charge(s): no charge, extrajudicial detention
- Status: ghost prisoner

Lutfi al-Arabi al-Gharisi is a citizen of Tunisia held in detention by the United States.

On 15 January 2010, the Department of Defense complied with a court order and published a heavily redacted list of Captives held in the Bagram Theater Internment Facility. There were 645 names on the list, which was dated 22 September 2009. One of the names was Lutfi al-Arabi al-Gharisi. Historian Andy Worthington, author of The Guantanamo Files, speculated that Lutfi al-Arabi al-Gharisi may have been a Tunisian, identified by human rights groups as a ghost prisoner. If so he was captured in late 2002 in Peshawar, Pakistan. Worthington reported this individual was held in the CIA's "dark prison", and several other CIA black sites. Worthington speculated that he might also have been a Tunisian captive identified by Marwan Jabour, named "Hudeifa".

== Named by the Senate Intelligence Committee as having been tortured without authorization ==
On 9 December 2014, the United States Senate Intelligence Committee published the 600-page unclassified summary of a 6,000-page report on the CIA's use of torture. While some of the CIA's captives were identified as only been subjected to torture that had been authorized from Washington, other captives, like Al-Gharisi, were identified as having been tortured by CIA officials who did not have authorization. According to the Intelligence Committee, Al-Gharisi "underwent at least two 48-hour sessions of sleep deprivation in October 2002."

On 4 October 2016, the Washington Post reported that Al-Gharisa and another CIA captive asserted that they were subjected to previously unknown techniques. In particular, they asserted that their captors had built what they described as an "electric chair", they were shown the chair, and threatened that it would be used on them. They also reported that they too had been subjected to a form of water-boarding, although the CIA claimed waterboarding had only been used on three high-value detainees.
