= Khalid al-Masri =

Alleged member of al-Qaeda

Khalid al-Masri (Arabic: خالد المصري; other transcriptions: Ḫālid al-Miṣrī, al-Maṣrī, Khālid, Khaled, El-Masri IPA: [ˈxæːled elˈmɑsˤɾi]) is the name of a person alleged to have approached two 9/11 hijackers on a train in Germany and suggested that they contact an alleged al-Qaeda operative in Duisburg.

The 9/11 Commission Report stated:

The available evidence indicates that in 1999, Atta, Binalshibh, Shehhi, and Jarrah decided to fight in Chechnya against the Russians. According to Binalshibh, a chance meeting on a train in Germany caused the group to travel to Afghanistan instead. An individual named Khalid al Masri approached Binalshibh and Shehhi (because they were Arabs with beards, Binalshibh thinks) and struck up a conversation about jihad in Chechnya. When they later called Masri and expressed interest in going to Chechnya, he told them to contact Abu Musab in Duisburg, Germany. Abu Musab turned out to be Mohamedou Ould Slahi, a significant al Qaeda operative who, even then, was well known to U.S. and German intelligence, though neither government apparently knew he was operating in Germany in late 1999. When telephoned by Binalshibh and Shehhi, Slahi reportedly invited these promising recruits to come see him in Duisburg.

However, in response to Slahi's petition for a writ of habeas corpus, a U.S. District Court found only that Slahi "provided lodging for three men for one night at his home in Germany [in November 1999], that one of them was Ramzi bin al-Shibh, and that there was discussion of jihad and Afghanistan".

An unrelated German citizen, Khalid El-Masri, spent almost five months in the covert CIA prison in Afghanistan called the Salt Pit in the early months of 2004, where he was interrogated and tortured. Alfreda Frances Bikowsky ordered El-Masri to be extraordinarily rendered, even though she only had a hunch El-Masri was the same person as al-Masri.

Slahi was arrested and tortured by U.S. officials at the Guantanamo Bay detention camp in Cuba. He was released in 2016, when he was found to be innocent.
