= Najib Lep =

Malaysian politician

Captain (Rtd) Haji Najib Lep
- نجيب ليڤ

Member of the Johor State Legislative Assembly for Bukit Pasir
- In office 9 May 2018 – 12 March 2022
- Preceded by: Position established
- Succeeded by: Mohamad Fazli Mohamad Salleh (BN–UMNO)
- Majority: 1,883 (2018)

Faction represented in the Johor State Legislative Assembly
- 2018–2020: Malaysian Islamic Party
- 2020–2022: Perikatan Nasional

Personal details
- Born: 14 March 1963 (age 63) Muar, Johor, Federation of Malaya (now Malaysia)
- Citizenship: Malaysia
- Party: Malaysian Islamic Party (PAS) (2018–2022); Independent (2022); United Malays National Organisation (UMNO) (2022–2023); National Trust Party (AMANAH) (since 2023)
- Other political affiliations: Gagasan Sejahtera (2018–2020); Perikatan Nasional (2020–2022); Barisan Nasional (2022–2023); Pakatan Harapan (since 2023)
- Relations: Nazir Lep (brother)
- Occupation: Politician

Najib bin Lep (born 14 March 1963) is a Malaysian politician and military veteran who was a member of the Johor State Legislative Assembly (MLA) for Bukit Pasir from May 2018 to March 2022. In the 2022 election, he contested the Bukit Pasir seat as an independent candidate and due to his actions he was sacked as a Malaysian Islamic Party (PAS) member with immediate effect.

On 18 October 2022, Lep joined UMNO.

On 2 September 2023, Lep joined the National Trust Party.

== Election results ==
Johor State Legislative Assembly
Year	Constituency	Candidate	Votes	Pct	Opponent(s)	Votes	Pct	Ballots cast	Majority	Turnout
2018	N08 Bukit Pasir	Najib Lep (PAS)	9,835	55.29%	Noriah Mahat (UMNO)	7,952	44.71%	19,305	1,883	85.70%
2022	N08 Bukit Pasir	Najib Lep (IND)	1,860	9.87%	Mohamad Fazli Mohamad Salleh (UMNO)	6,048	32.11%	18,837	198	58.48%
2022	N08 Bukit Pasir	Najib Lep (IND)	1,860	9.87%	Muhamad Nur Iqbal Abdul Razak (PAS)	5,850	31.06%	18,837	198	58.48%
2022	N08 Bukit Pasir	Najib Lep (IND)	1,860	9.87%	Elia Nadira Sabudin (AMANAH)	4,676	24.82%	18,837	198	58.48%
2022	N08 Bukit Pasir	Najib Lep (IND)	1,860	9.87%	Johar Siraj (Independent)	207	1.10%	18,837	198	58.48%
2022	N08 Bukit Pasir	Najib Lep (IND)	1,860	9.87%	Mohd Akhiri Mahmood (PEJUANG)	196	1.04%	18,837	198	58.48%
2026	N08 Bukit Pasir	Najib Lep (AMANAH)	6,620	26.79%	Mohamad Fazli Mohamad Salleh (UMNO)	14,220	57.54%	24,712	7,600	73.04%
2026	N08 Bukit Pasir	Najib Lep (AMANAH)	6,620	26.79%	Idzhar Nasirrudin (BERSATU)	3,872	15.67%	24,712	7,600	73.04%
