= Hiwa Abdul Rahman Rashul =

Iraqi held by the CIA

Hiwa Abdul Rahman Rashul, nicknamed Triple-X by his American guards, was the first ghost detainee to be publicly acknowledged by American authorities.

Captured by Kurdish forces in Iraq in June or July 2003, he was turned over to the CIA who believed he was a member of Ansar al-Islam. He was then moved to a CIA prison in Afghanistan.

Office of Legal Counsel representative Jack L. Goldsmith informed Alberto R. Gonzales in October 2003 that Rashul was legally protected under the 4th Geneva Convention, and must legally be returned to Iraq.

On June 16, 2004 Secretary of Defense Donald Rumsfeld acknowledged that he had ordered Rashul to be imprisoned without record, at the request of DCI George Tenet.

Rashul was nicknamed "Triple-X" because, since he was kept off the books, his guards never learned his real name. When some of the circumstance of his incarceration became public, it was suggested that the reason he had been secretly incarcerated for seven months, without being interrogated, was that he got lost. Because of the order to keep him off the books those who would have interrogated him forgot about him, or could not find him. His whereabouts since 2004 are unknown.
