= Abu Hamza Rabia =

Egyptian al-Qaeda member (1960–2005)

- Born: c. 1960 Egypt
- Died: November 30, 2005 (aged 45) (approx.) Asoray, near Miranshah, North Waziristan, Pakistan
- Cause of death: U.S. drone strike
- Allegiance: Al-Qaeda
- Known for: Being alleged third-in-command of al-Qaeda
- Conflicts: War on Terror

Abu Hamza Rabia (/ˈɑːbuː ˈhɑːmzə rəˈbiːə/ AH-boo HAHM-zə rə-BEE-ə; c. 1960 – November 30, 2005) was an Egyptian member of al-Qaeda, described in news accounts as a high-ranking leader within the organization's hierarchy. His death in a surprise CIA drone attack was widely reported by media outlets around the world.

According to American intelligence officials, Rabia was al-Qaeda's third in command. Few details have been made available about his background, although CNN reports confirmed his Egyptian origins and indicated that he was in his thirties. He and four other men, two of them also Arabs, were killed in the village of Asoray, near Miranshah, the capital of North Waziristan. His death stirred controversy because it was Pakistani policy that US forces were not allowed in the country. Initially US and Pakistani authorities denied that the surprise airstrike was launched from a US Predator drone.

In a subsequent development, the murder of local journalist Hayatullah Khan, whose body was found months after his disappearance, was tied to his investigation into Rabia's death.
