= Mohamad Fazli Mohamad Salleh =

Malaysian politician and engineer (born 1986)

Yang Berhormat Tuan Mohamad Fazli Mohamad Salleh MLA
- محمد فضلي محمد صالح

Member of the Johor State Executive Council (Works, Transport & Infrastructure : 26 March 2022–13 February 2024 & Works, Transport, Infrastructure & Communication : since 13 February 2024)
- Incumbent
- Assumed office 13 February 2024
- Monarch: Ibrahim Iskandar
- Menteri Besar: Onn Hafiz Ghazi
- Preceded by: Himself (Works, Transport & Infrastructure); Norlizah Noh (Communication)
- Constituency: Bukit Pasir
- In office 26 March 2022 – 13 February 2024
- Monarch: Ibrahim Iskandar
- Menteri Besar: Onn Hafiz Ghazi
- Preceded by: Mohd Solihan Badri
- Succeeded by: Himself
- Constituency: Bukit Pasir

Member of the Johor State Legislative Assembly for Bukit Pasir
- Incumbent
- Assumed office 12 March 2022
- Preceded by: Najib Lep (PAS)
- Majority: 198 (2022); 7,600 (2026)

Faction represented in Johor State Legislative Assembly
- 2022–: Barisan Nasional

Personal details
- Born: Mohamad Fazli bin Mohamad Salleh; 4 November 1986 (age 39) Kampung Jalan Raja, Bukit Pasir, Johor, Malaysia
- Citizenship: Malaysian
- Party: United Malays National Organisation (UMNO)
- Other political affiliations: Barisan Nasional (BN)
- Occupation: Politician
- Profession: Engineer

Mohamad Fazli bin Mohamad Salleh (born 4 November 1986) is a Malaysian politician and engineer who has served as Member of the Johor State Executive Council (EXCO) in the Barisan Nasional (BN) state administration under Menteri Besar Onn Hafiz Ghazi as well as Member of the Johor State Legislative Assembly (MLA) for Bukit Pasir since March 2022. He is a member of the United Malays National Organisation (UMNO), a component party of the BN coalition.

== Personal life ==
Mohamad Fazli was born in Kampung Jalan Raja, Bukit Pasir, Johor, Malaysia on 4 November 1986.

== Political career ==
=== Member of the Johor State Executive Council (since 2022) ===
On 26 March 2022, Mohamad Fazli was appointed a Member of the Johor State EXCO in charge of Works, Transport and Infrastructure by Menteri Besar Onn Hafiz.

=== Member of the Johor State Legislative Assembly (since 2022) ===
==== 2022 Johor state election ====
In the 2022 Johor state election, Mohamad Fazli made his electoral debut after being nominated by BN to contest the Bukit Pasir state seat. He won the seat and was elected into the Johor State Legislative Assembly as the Bukit Pasir MLA after narrowly defeating Iqbal Razak of Perikatan Nasional (PN), Elia Nadira of Pakatan Harapan (PH), defending MLA and independent candidate Najib Lep, another independent candidate Johar Siraj and Mohd Akhiri Mahmood of the Homeland Fighters Party (PEJUANG) by a majority of only 198 votes.

== Other career ==
=== Tenaga Nasional Berhad ===
Mohamad Fazli used to work with Tenaga Nasional Berhad (TNB).

== Election results ==
Johor State Legislative Assembly
Year	Constituency	Name	Votes	Pct	Opponent(s)	Votes	Pct	Ballots cast	Majority	Turnout
2022	N08 Bukit Pasir	Mohamad Fazli Mohamad Salleh (UMNO)	6,048	32.11%	Iqbal Razak (PAS)	5,850	31.06%	18,837	198	58.48%
2022	N08 Bukit Pasir	Mohamad Fazli Mohamad Salleh (UMNO)	6,048	32.11%	Elia Nadira (AMANAH)	4,676	24.82%	18,837	198	58.48%
2022	N08 Bukit Pasir	Mohamad Fazli Mohamad Salleh (UMNO)	6,048	32.11%	Najib Lep (IND)	1,860	9.87%	18,837	198	58.48%
2022	N08 Bukit Pasir	Mohamad Fazli Mohamad Salleh (UMNO)	6,048	32.11%	Johar Siraj (IND)	207	1.10%	18,837	198	58.48%
2022	N08 Bukit Pasir	Mohamad Fazli Mohamad Salleh (UMNO)	6,048	32.11%	Mohd Akhiri Mahmood (PEJUANG)	196	1.04%	18,837	198	58.48%
2026	N08 Bukit Pasir	Mohamad Fazli Mohamad Salleh (UMNO)	14,220	57.54%	Najib Lep (AMANAH)	6,620	26.79%	24,712	7,600	73.04%
2026	N08 Bukit Pasir	Mohamad Fazli Mohamad Salleh (UMNO)	14,220	57.54%	Idzhar Nasirrudin (BERSATU)	3,872	15.67%	24,712	7,600	73.04%
