= Abdul Salam Al Hilal =

Yemeni Guantanamo detainee

Abd al-Salam al-Hilah
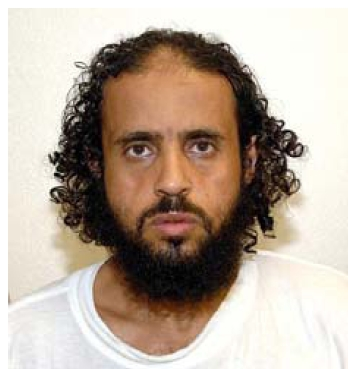
- Guantanamo mugshot
- Born: January 30, 1968 (age 58); Sanaa, Yemen
- Detained at: Guantanamo
- Other names: Al Hela, Abdulsalam
- ISN: 1463
- Status: Released

Abd al-Salam al-Hilah is a citizen of Yemen who was held in extrajudicial detention in the United States Guantanamo Bay detainment camps, in Cuba.

The Department of Defense lists his place of birth as Sanaa, Yemen and his date of birth as January 30, 1968.

== CIA detention ==
Al-Hilah was captured, in Cairo, on September 19, 2002, while on a business trip. John Sifton, of Human Rights Watch, says that Al-Hilah disappeared, for eighteen months, before surfacing in American detention in the US naval base in Guantanamo Bay, Cuba. According to medical records published on March 16, 2007, his "in process date" at Guantanamo was September 20, 2004.

Since his arrival in Guantanamo Bay, he is one of the approximately 200 detainees who has had a writ of habeas corpus filed on his behalf. In recently declassified discussions with his lawyer, al-Hilah says that after his capture he was sent to Baku Azerbaijan for two months, and then spent 16 months in secret bases in Afghanistan, including "the dark prison".

== Official status reviews ==
Originally the Bush Presidency asserted that captives apprehended in the "war on terror" were not covered by the Geneva Conventions, and could be held indefinitely, without charge, and without an open and transparent review of the justifications for their detention. In 2004, the United States Supreme Court ruled, in Rasul v. Bush, that Guantanamo captives were entitled to being informed of the allegations justifying their detention, and were entitled to try to refute them.

=== Office for the Administrative Review of Detained Enemy Combatants ===
Combatant Status Review Tribunals were held in a 3x5 meter trailer where the captive sat with his hands and feet shackled to a bolt in the floor.

Following the Supreme Court's ruling the Department of Defense set up the Office for the Administrative Review of Detained Enemy Combatants.

Scholars at the Brookings Institution, led by Benjamin Wittes, listed the captives still held in Guantanamo in December 2008, according to whether their detention was justified by certain common allegations:

- Abd al-Salam al-Hilah was listed as one of the captives who "The military alleges ... are members of Al Qaeda."
- Abd al-Salam al-Hilah was listed as one of the captives who was an "al Qaeda operative".

=== Habeas corpus petition ===
Abdulsalam Ali Abdulrahman Al Hela v. George W. Bush had a writ of habeas corpus filed on his behalf.

=== Joint Review Task Force ===
On January 21, 2009, the day he was inaugurated, United States President Barack Obama issued three Executive orders related to the detention of individuals in Guantanamo. That new review system was composed of officials from six departments, where the OARDEC reviews were conducted entirely by the Department of Defense. When it reported back, a year later, the Joint Review Task Force classified some individuals as too dangerous to be transferred from Guantanamo, even though there was no evidence to justify laying charges against them. On April 9, 2013, that document was made public after a Freedom of Information Act request. Abd al-Salam al-Hilah was one of the 71 individuals deemed too innocent to charge, but too dangerous to release. Obama said those deemed too innocent to charge, but too dangerous to release would start to receive reviews from a Periodic Review Board.

=== Periodic Review Board ===
The first review was not convened until November 20, 2013. Al-Hilah was approved for transfer on June 8, 2021.

== Hunger strike ==
Al-Hilah was reported to have participated in a hunger strike that led to a deterioration in his health.

== Children's death ==
"His mother died, his father died, his two sons died, and now his uncle has died. Do they want us to all be dead before they bring him back home again?

— Hila's sister, April 2010.

On April 23, 2009, Yemeni newspapers reported two of the four children of Guantanamo captive "Abdul Salam Al Hilam" were killed, in his home, by the explosion of a hand grenade. The two boys were reported to be nine and eleven years old, and ten and eleven years old. They were reported to have died when playing with the grenade.

In 2008, camp authorities started to allow compliant captives to make an annual phone call home. The Yemen Post reports that Al Hila's sons died just two days after his call.

== Assassination fears ==
On August 1, 2009, the Saba News reported that in a phone call after his son's death he told his family that he feared he would be assassinated in Guantanamo. He told his family not to believe accounts that he committed suicide if he should die in Guantanamo.

On May 17, 2010, Saba News reported Al Hilah's family had recently received a letter where he wrote he believed camp authorities had a new plan to assassinate him.

== Release ==
Al-Hilah and 10 other detainees were transferred to Oman on January 6, 2025.

== See also ==
- Black site
- Extrajudicial prisoners of the United States
- List of Guantanamo Bay detainees
