= Hassan bin Attash =

Saudi Guantanamo Bay detainee (born 1985)

Hassan Muhammad Salih bin Attash
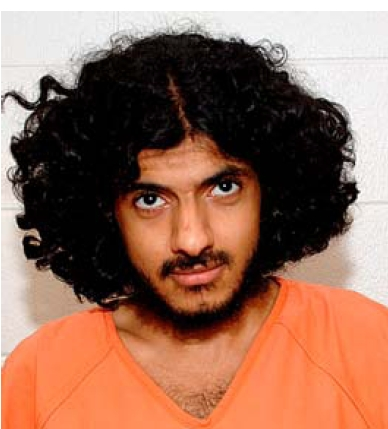
- Hassan bin Attash, wearing an orange uniform issued to non-compliant individuals
- Born: 1985 (age 40–41); Jeddah, Saudi Arabia
- Arrested: September 11, 2002; Karachi; Pakistani security officials, CIA
- Citizenship: Saudi Arabia
- Detained at: Guantanamo, previously held in "the dark prison"
- Other name: Hassan Muhammad Ali Bin Attash
- ISN: 1456
- Charge: Extrajudicial detention
- Status: Released
- Occupation: student

Hassan Muhammad Salih bin Attash (Arabic: حسن محمد علي بن عطاش) is a citizen of Saudi Arabia who was held in extrajudicial detention by the United States in the Guantanamo Bay detention camp in Cuba. Joint Task Force Guantanamo counter-terrorism analysts estimate that bin Attash was born in 1985, in Jeddah, Saudi Arabia.

He was held at Guantanamo for 20 years.

Attash was seventeen years old when he was captured. Hassan is the brother of Walid bin Attash, who has also been described as an inmate in the CIA's network of secret prisons. Hassan, too, claims he spent time in the other prisons, including "the dark prison", prior to being detained in Guantanamo Bay, Cuba.

== Human Rights Concern ==
The circumstances of Hassan bin Attash have triggered the attention of several human rights organizations, including Amnesty International, Reprieve and Human Rights Watch. According to their accounts Hassan bin Attash was captured on September 10, 2002, spent time in the dark prison, spent sixteen months in Jordan, where he was hung upside down, and beaten on the soles of his feet, which were then immersed in salt water. They assert that he underwent this kind of treatment during questioning until he was willing to sign anything. They claim that he wasn't interrogated about anything he himself had done, but rather about the activity of his older brother. They assert that his 70-year-old father underwent similar questioning. Bin Attash was flown to Guantanamo in March 2003.

The Boston Globe quoted Guantanamo spokesmen Lieutenant commander Chito Peppler, who insisted, "US policy requires all detainees to be treated humanely,"

Peppler repeated the assertion that none of the captive's assertions of abuse were credible because al-Qaeda trained operatives to lie about abuse.

== Transportation to Guantanamo Bay ==
Human Rights group Reprieve reports that flight records show two captives named Al-Sharqawi and Hassan bin Attash were flown from Kabul in September 2002. The two men were flown aboard N379P, a plane suspected to be part of the CIA's ghost fleet. Flight records showed that the plane originally departed from Diego Garcia, stopped in Morocco, Portugal, then Kabul before landing in Guantánamo Bay.

== Official status reviews ==
Originally the Bush Presidency asserted that captives apprehended in the "war on terror" were not covered by the Geneva Conventions, and could be held indefinitely, without charge, and without an open and transparent review of the justifications for their detention. In 2004 the United States Supreme Court ruled, in Rasul v. Bush, that Guantanamo captives were entitled to being informed of the allegations justifying their detention, and were entitled to try to refute them.

=== Office for the Administrative Review of Detained Enemy Combatants ===
Combatant Status Review Tribunals were held in a 3x5 meter trailer where the captive sat with his hands and feet shackled to a bolt in the floor.

Following the Supreme Court's ruling the Department of Defense set up the Office for the Administrative Review of Detained Enemy Combatants.

Scholars at the Brookings Institution, led by Benjamin Wittes, listed the captives still held in Guantanamo in December 2008, according to whether their detention was justified by certain common allegations:

- Hassan Muhammad Salih Bin Attash was listed as one of the captives who ...
- Hassan Muhammad Salih Bin Attash was listed as one of the captives who "The military alleges ... traveled to Afghanistan for jihad."
- Hassan Muhammad Salih Bin Attash was listed as one of the captives who "The military alleges that the following detainees stayed in Al Qaeda, Taliban or other guest- or safehouses."
- Hassan Muhammad Salih Bin Attash was listed as one of the captives who "The military alleges ... took military or terrorist training in Afghanistan."
- Hassan Muhammad Salih Bin Attash was listed as one of the captives who "The military alleges that the following detainees were captured under circumstances that strongly suggest belligerency."
- Hassan Muhammad Salih Bin Attash was listed as one of the captives who was an "al Qaeda operative".
- Hassan Muhammad Salih Bin Attash was listed as one of the "82 detainees made no statement to CSRT or ARB tribunals or made statements that do not bear materially on the military's allegations against them."

=== Habeas corpus ===
A writ of habeas corpus was filed on behalf of Bin Attash.

=== Joint Review Task Force ===
On January 21, 2009, the day he was inaugurated, United States President Barack Obama issued three executive orders related to the detention of individuals in Guantanamo Bay detention camp. That new review system was composed of officials from six departments, where the OARDEC reviews were conducted entirely by the Department of Defense. When it reported back, a year later, the Guantanamo Review Task Force classified some individuals as too dangerous to be transferred from Guantanamo, even though there was insufficient evidence to justify charging them. On April 9, 2013, that document was made public after a Freedom of Information Act request. Hassan bin Attash was one of the 71 individuals deemed unable to be charged due to insufficient evidence, but too dangerous to release. Obama said those deemed unable to be charged due to insufficient evidence, but too dangerous to release would start to receive reviews from a Periodic Review Board.

== Periodic Review Board ==
The first review wasn't convened until November 20, 2013. As of 15 April 2016, 29 individuals had reviews, but Hassan bin Attash wasn't one of them. Bin Attash was approved for transfer on April 13, 2022.

== Release ==
Bin Attash and 10 other detainees were transferred to Oman on January 6, 2025.

== See also ==
- Minors detained in the global war on terror
- Extraordinary rendition by the United States
