= Mohammed Nazir Lep =

Malaysian terrorist suspect (born 1976)

Mohammed Nazir bin Lep
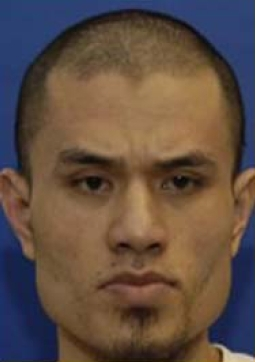
- Mohammed Nazir bin Lep in 2008
- Born: December 26, 1976 (age 49); Johor, Malaysia
- Arrested: 2003; Bangkok, Thailand; Royal Thai Police
- Detained at: CIA black sites, Guantanamo
- Other names: Lillie, Bin Lep, Bin Lap, Ali, Mohammad Nasir Bin Lep, Bashir Bin Lep
- ISN: ISN10022
- Charge: Charged before a military commission in 2021
- Status: Pleaded guilty
- Relatives: Najib Lep (Elder brother)

Mohammed Nazir bin Lep (also referred to as Lillie; born December 26, 1976) is a Malaysian alleged to be affiliated with Jemaah Islamiyah and Al-Qaeda, who was held in American DoD custody in the Guantanamo Bay detention camp. He is one of 119 detainees previously held at secret Black Sites abroad, which included being subjected to Enhanced Interrogation Techniques. In the ODNI biographies, Bin Lep is described as a high value detainee and lieutenant of Hambali (along with another alleged subordinate, Mohamad Farik Amin). He was transferred from clandestine custody to the Guantanamo Bay detention camps, in Cuba, on September 6, 2006.

== Early life ==
Mohammed Nazir bin Lep was born in 1976 in Johor, Malaysia. He received a degree in architecture from Universiti Poly-Tech Malaysia (UPTM).

== Guantanamo detainment ==
Mohammed Nazir bin Lep was detained in Guantanamo Bay in 2006 when he was transferred into DoD custody. Throughout his internment, the Malaysian Government has sought to repatriate him in addition to another Malaysian national held in Guantanamo Bay.

== Guantanamo Review Task Force ==
On January 21, 2009, the day he was inaugurated, United States President Barack Obama issued three executive orders related to the detention of individuals in Guantanamo Bay detention camp. That new review system was composed of officials from six departments, where the OARDEC reviews were conducted entirely by the Department of Defense. When it reported back, a year later, the Guantanamo Review Task Force classified some individuals as too dangerous to be transferred from Guantanamo, even though there was insufficient evidence to justify charging them. On April 9, 2013, that document was made public after a Freedom of Information Act request. He was one of the 71 individuals deemed unable to be charged due to insufficient evidence, but too dangerous to release. Obama said those deemed unable to be charged due to insufficient evidence but too dangerous to release would start to receive reviews from a Periodic Review Board.

== Periodic Review Board ==
The first review wasn't convened until November 20, 2013. As of 15 April 2016, 29 individuals had reviews, but Nazir was not one of them. Nazir was denied approval for transfer on September 15, 2016.

== Trial ==
In August 2021, Mohammed Nazir bin Lep, Hambali, and Mohammed Farik bin Amin were charged by the United States government with murder and terrorism for their involvement in the 2002 Bali bombings. On January 26, 2024, a military jury at Guantánamo sentenced Nazir and Farik to 23 years' confinement for their roles in the bombings. However, the sentence may be reduced to at most 6 years' confinement due to a secret deal the pair reached with a senior Pentagon official. They were granted the reduced sentence in exchange for agreeing to testify against Hambali.

On December 18, 2024, Nazir and Farik were transferred to Malaysia.
