= Tariq Mahmood (detainee) =

British Pakistani man

- Born: Birmingham, United Kingdom
- Arrested: 2003-10, 2004-2(?); Rawalpindi; ISI
- Released: 2004
- Citizenship: United Kingdom
- Detained at: Rawalpindi
- Charge: released after 5 month without charges
- Occupation: taxi driver
- Children: 2

Tariq Mahmood is a British Pakistani man who was captured in Islamabad by Pakistani security forces in October 2003. His family reports that Tariq was tortured, while in Pakistani custody, with the knowledge or cooperation of UK and American security officials.

== Background ==
Tariq Mahmood is a married father of two from Sparkhill, Birmingham. The former taxi driver flew to Pakistan in 2001 to settle a land dispute over a family home there.

== Arrest ==
In October 2003, Mahmood was held on suspicion of being associated with a "banned organization" under the Security of Pakistan Act, Section 10, and was not given immediate access to courts despite his British citizenship. Pakistani officials confirmed on the 17th of November that they had detained and were questioning Mahmood. At the time of his arrest, Mahmood had been living in Pakistan for three years. His wife and two children joined him, and been living in Pakistan for two years. They moved back to their Birmingham home following Mahmood's arrest.

In early 2004 Mahmood was arrested by police in Rawalpindi. The police report stated that ISI had released him from custody on the side of a road. Police were called with details on where to find him, and that he was a foreigner with no identification, a crime under Pakistani law. His brother, Asif Mahmood claimed that Mahmood had been mistreated by MI5, and the FBI while in ISI custody.

Pakistani security reportedly turned him over to American forces, prompting fears he would be sent to Guantanamo Bay Naval Base. In February 2004, Pakistani intelligence sources indicated Tariq Mahmood had been transported to Bagram Airfield, Afghanistan, a "stepping stone" to Guantanamo Bay.

Human Rights Watch listed him as one of 39 ghost detainees in 2005, who are not given any legal rights or access to counsel, and who are likely not reported to or seen by the International Committee of the Red Cross.

On February 19, 2004, The Guardian listed the nine UK citizens then known to have been held in Guantanamo. They listed him as a possible 10th UK citizen held in Guantanamo. His presence in Guantanamo has never been confirmed.

The Guardian spoke to Mahmood's friends and relatives, who claimed he was now living in Dubai. The Guardian was unable to make contact with Mahmood to discuss his case.

== See also ==
- List of people who disappeared mysteriously: post-1970
