= Hayatullah (detainee) =

Afghan held in extrajudicial detention

- Born: 1979 (age 46–47)
- Arrested: 2007-07; Kandahar "foreign forces"
- Released: 2009-10
- Citizenship: Afghanistan
- Detained at: the dark prison, Bagram
- ISN: 3494
- Charge(s): no charge, extrajudicial detention
- Occupation: pharmacist

Hayatullah (born 1979) is a citizen of Afghanistan who was held in extrajudicial detention in the United States' Bagram Theater Internment Facility. He was interviewed by The New York Times in November 2007, and gave an account being held for 28 months, first in "the black prison" and then in Bagram.

According to his account Hayatullah was a pharmacist, with no association with or knowledge of the Taliban's activities, who was apprehended because he had the same name as a Taliban leader, Hajji Hayatullah.

Hayatullah described being held for forty days in "the black prison", which he believed was near the main prison at Bagram. He said that when he was held there, in July 2007, the walls were concrete blocks, but that he was told, by captives who had been held there a long time, the walls had originally been covered in plywood that had been painted black. He said that, unlike Bagram, each captive was kept in a cell of his own. He described how the lack of natural light meant that the captives didn't know when it was day or night, and so they didn't know when to say their prayers. He said that the International Committee of the Red Cross was not allowed to visit the black prison. Hayatullah also called the black prison" "Tor Jail".

Hayatullah told The New York Times that both he and his partner were apprehended, in their shop, shortly after noon. He said they were hooded and bound. He said in addition to being accused of being Haji Hayatullah, the Taliban leader, he was also accused of once allowing members of the Taliban to enter his house, and that he served them a meal.

According to Hayatullah, by the time he was sent to Bagram, the captives were still kept in communal cells, with up to twenty captives in each. He said that in Bagram the captives were allowed to talk with one another, and he learned all their stories. He described suicide attempts by other captives.

Hayatullah said that representatives of the Red Cross were allowed to visit the captives in Bagram, every 40 days, and that, through them, he was able to get mail to his family, finally telling them where he was. He said that not only had the detention been damaging to his own health, it had a profound effect on his parents' health.

Hayatullah told The New York Times that he understood the Americans' task, but he was very critical that the allegations against the captives were not subjected to a judicial review.
