= Mohamad Farik Amin =

Malaysian al-Qaeda member

Mohammed Farik bin Amin
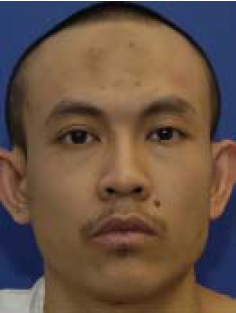
- Guantanamo captive Mohammed Farik bin Amin wearing the white uniform issued to compliant captives
- Born: February 16, 1975 (age 51); Kajang, Selangor, Malaysia
- Citizenship: Malaysia
- Detained at: black sites, Guantanamo
- ISN: 10021
- Charge: Charged before a military commission in 2021
- Status: Pleaded guilty

Mohammed Farik bin Amin (born February 16, 1975), alias Zubair Zaid, is a Malaysian who is alleged to be a senior member of Jemaah Islamiyah and al Qaeda. He was held in American custody in the Guantanamo Bay detention camp. He is one of the 14 detainees who had previously been held for years at CIA black sites. In the ODNI biographies of those 14, Amin is described as a direct subordinate of Hambali. Farik Amin is also a cousin of well-known Malaysian terrorist Zulkifli Abdhir.

According to Time Magazine, Amin, Hambali, and Mohammed Nazir Bin Lep were detained and interrogated on the remote Indian Ocean island of Diego Garcia, where they confessed to scouting out possible sites for terrorist bombings throughout Thailand. Time also reported that the three were captured together in central Thailand on August 11, 2003. The ODNI document says that Hambali and bin Lep were captured together, but only that Amin was captured some time in 2003.

The Department of Defense announced on August 9, 2007 that all fourteen of the "high-value detainees" who had been transferred to Guantanamo from the CIA's black sites, had been officially classified as "enemy combatants". Although judges Peter Brownback and Keith J. Allred had ruled two months earlier that only "illegal enemy combatants" could face military commissions, the Department of Defense waived the qualifier and said that all fourteen men could now face charges before Guantanamo military commissions.

Scholars at the Brookings Institution, led by Benjamin Wittes, listed the captives still held in Guantanamo in December 2008, according to whether their detention was justified by certain common allegations:

- Mohammed Farik bin Amin was listed as one of the captives who was a member of the "al Qaeda leadership cadre".
- Mohammed Farik bin Amin was listed as one of the "82 detainees made no statement to CSRT or ARB tribunals or made statements that do not bear materially on the military's allegations against them".

== Bin Amin's Capture by Thai Authorities ==
"On June 8, 2003, [Mr. bin Amin, commonly referred to by the Government as “Zubair”] was detained by the government of Thailand. While still in Thai custody, Zubair was questioned about his efforts to obtain fraudulent [redacted] documents . . . Zubair admitted to seeking illegal [redacted] documents on behalf of Hambali."

== Bin Amin's Time in CIA Custody at COBALT ==
“After being transferred to CIA custody and rendered to the CIA’s COBALT detention site, [Mr. bin Amin] was immediately subjected to the CIA’s enhanced interrogation techniques.” After days of being subjected to these techniques, Mr. bin Amin was again questioned. Mr. bin Amin “confirmed the same information he previously provided during interrogation by Thai authorities concerning the illegally obtained documents.”

The Government’s treatment of Mr. bin Amin, along with the treatment of other detainees, is detailed to a small degree in the Report of the Senate Select Committee on Intelligence Committee Study of the Central Intelligence Agency’s Detention and Interrogation Program. (Mr. bin Amin is frequently referred to as Abu Zubair throughout the Report.) Specifically, CIA interrogators were authorized to and did subject Mr. bin Amin to “enhanced interrogation techniques,” as well as “standard interrogation techniques.”

=== Standard Interrogation Techniques ===
Permissible “standard interrogation techniques” authorized by the CIA include, but are not limited to, the following:

- Isolation
- Sleep deprivation not to exceed 72 hours
- Reduced caloric intake
- Deprivation of reading material
- The use of loud music
- The use of white noise
- The use of diapers for limited time periods.

=== Enhanced Interrogation Techniques ===
The CIA’s “enhanced interrogation techniques” were techniques that “incorporate[d] physical or psychological pressure beyond Standard Techniques.” The CIA identifies “enhanced techniques” as the following:

- Attention grasp
- Walling
- Facial hold
- Facial slap
- Abdominal slap
- Cramped confinement
- Wall standing
- Stress positions
- Sleep deprivation beyond 72 hours
- The use of diapers for prolonged periods
- The use of 'harmless' insects
- Waterboarding
- Other techniques 'as approved.'

While in the custody of the United States, Mr. bin Amin was subject to both “standard” and “enhanced” interrogation. Mr. bin Amin was also subject to treatment that was not authorized. Specifically, an interrogator put “a broomstick behind the knees of Zubair when Zubair was in a stress position on his knees on the floor.”

=== COBALT Conditions ===
DETENTION SITE COBALT housed 64 detainees between September 2002 and 2004. From January to August 2003, the CIA's enhanced interrogations were primarily used at DETENTION SITE COBALT and DETENTION SITE BLUE. CIA employees themselves referred to COBALT as “the dungeon,” and one CIA employee asserted, “COBALT was itself an enhanced interrogation technique.”

At DETENTION SITE COBALT, CIA detainees were subjected to multiple uses of “sleep deprivation, required standing, loud music, sensory deprivation, extended isolation, reduced quantity and quality of food, nudity, and 'rough treatment' of CIA detainees." Detention conditions independent of interrogation left detainees “shackled in complete darkness and isolation, with a bucket for human waste, and without notable heat during the winter months." Detainees were forced to stand with their arms shackled above their heads for extended periods of time. At times, detainees were left to urinate and defecate in adult diapers rather than being unshackled to use a waste bucket or latrine. “At DETENTION SITE COBALT, detainees were often held down, naked, on a tarp on the floor, with the tarp pulled up around them to form a makeshift tub, while cold or refrigerated water was poured on them."

Unauthorized “interrogation techniques” used at DETENTION SITE COBALT included “rectal rehydration” absent evidence of medical necessity, or threats of same; rectal exams conducted with “excessive force”; and allowing “groups of four or more interrogators. . . to apply the CIA’s enhanced interrogation techniques as a group against a single detainee. In at least two instances, mock executions were used at DETENTION SITE COBALT. Despite medical complications such as a broken foot (2 detainees), a sprained ankle (1 detainee), and a prosthetic leg (1 detainee), these detainees were shackled “in a standing position for sleep deprivation for extended periods of time.” While Mr. bin Amin was at DETENTION SITE COBALT, “sleep deprivation” for a period of up to 72 hours was considered standard.

Prior to Mr. bin Amin’s arrival at DETENTION SITE COBALT, another detainee, Gul Rahman, had been killed as a result of coercive interrogation and harsh conditions of confinement employed by the CIA. Those involved in the death “remained key figures in the CIA interrogation program and received no reprimand or sanction for Rahman’s death.”

The Committee found “a CIA photograph of a waterboard at DETENTION SITE COBALT. While there are no records of the CIA using the waterboard at COBALT, the waterboard device in the photograph is surrounded by buckets, with a bottle of unknown pink solution (filled two thirds of the way to the top) and a watering can resting on the wooden beams of the waterboard.” The CIA was unable to provide an explanation for this.

DETENTION SITE COBALT housed 64 detainees between September 2002 and 2004.

=== Enhanced Interrogation Techniques Ineffectiveness ===
The Senate Committee made a number of findings and conclusions regarding the CIA’s use of “enhanced interrogation techniques,” including:

- The use of these techniques “was not an effective means of acquiring intelligence or gaining cooperation from detainees”
- The CIA used “inaccurate claims” regarding the effectiveness of the use of these techniques”
- The techniques “were brutal and far worse than the CIA represented to policymakers and others”
- “The conditions of confinement of CIR detainees were harsher than the CIA had represented to policymakers and others.”
- “The CIA repeatedly provided inaccurate information to the Department of Justice, impeding a proper legal analysis of the CIA’s Detention and Interrogation Program”
- The CIA engaged in active avoidance of or impeded congressional oversight of the program
- “The CIA impeded effective White House oversight and decision-making”
- The management and operation of the program both “complicated, and in some cases impeded, the national security missions of other Executive Branch agencies”
- “The CIA impeded oversight by the CIA’s Office of Inspector General”
- “The CIA coordinated the release of classified information to the media, including inaccurate information concerning the effectiveness” of the techniques
- The techniques used on detainees by the CIA included “coercive interrogation techniques that had not been approved by the Department of Justice or had not been authorized by CIA Headquarters”
- The CIA did not “adequately evaluate the effectiveness of its enhanced interrogation techniques”

=== Opinions Regarding the Enhanced Interrogation Techniques Beyond The Report ===
==== CIA Response to the Report ====
CIA acknowledged there should have been, but was no, systematic, comprehensive assessment of the effectiveness of various techniques.

==== CIA Director John Brennan ====
CIA Director John O. Brennan has cast doubt on the effectiveness of “enhanced interrogation techniques,” stating “you cannot establish cause and effect between the application of these [techniques] and credible information that came out of these individuals.”

==== President Barack Obama ====
President Barack Obama, after the release of the Senate Subcommittee’s Report, also commented on the actions of the CIA. “We tortured some folks,” Obama said. “When we engaged in some of these enhanced interrogation techniques, techniques that I believe and I think any fair-minded person would believe were torture, we crossed a line. And that needs to be understood and accepted.”

==== The Ninth Circuit Court ====
The Ninth Circuit Court appears to be the first Court in the country to address the Government’s use of techniques such as waterboarding, confinement in a coffin sized box, “walling, attention grasps, slapping, facial holds, stress positions, cramped confinement, white noise and sleep deprivation. To use colloquial terms, as was suggested by the Senate Select Committee Report, Abu Zubaydah was tortured.”

==== Subsequent Research ====
In 2006, psychologists and other specialists commissioned by the Intelligence Science Board released a report that concluded pain, coercion, and threats are unlikely to elicit good information from a subject, and urged that more research be done. In 2016, a team of researchers from Harvard University concluded the United States’ treatment of detainees had incurred strategic costs that greatly damaged US national security. Also in 2016, researchers for the FBI-administered High-Value Detainee Interrogation Group concluded that the most effective practices for eliciting accurate information and actionable intelligence are “non-coercive, rapport-based, information-gathering interviewing and interrogation methods.”

=== "Architects" of the Enhanced Interrogation Techniques ===
In 2017, the American Civil Liberties Union, representing Suleiman Abdullah Salim, Mohamed Ahmed Ben Soud, and the family of Gul Rahman, announced a settlement in a lawsuit filed against Dr. James Mitchell and Dr. Bruce Jessen, CIA contracted psychologists who developed the methods used against the plaintiffs.

The lawsuit, based on the Alien Tort Statute, alleged Mitchell and Jessen committed gross human rights violations “for their commission of torture, cruel, inhuman, and degrading treatment; nonconsensual human experimentation; and war crimes.”

The following joint statement from the plaintiffs and the defendants was agreed to as part of the settlement:

"Drs. Mitchell and Jessen acknowledge that they worked with the CIA to develop a program for the CIA that contemplated the use of specific coercive methods to interrogate certain detainees.

Plaintiff Gul Rahman was subjected to abuses in the CIA program that resulted in his death and in pain and suffering for his family, including his personal representative Obaidullah. Plaintiffs Suleiman Abdullah Salim and Mohamed Ahmed Ben Soud were also subjected to coercive methods in the CIA program, which resulted in pain and suffering for them and their families.

Plaintiffs assert that they were subjected to some of the methods proposed by Drs. Mitchell and Jessen to the CIA, and stand by their allegations regarding the responsibility of Drs. Mitchell and Jessen.

Drs. Mitchell and Jessen assert that the abuses of Mr. Salim and Mr. Ben Soud occurred without their knowledge or consent and that they were not responsible for those actions. Drs. Mitchell and Jessen also assert that they were unaware of the specific abuses that ultimately caused Mr. Rahman's death and are also not responsible for those actions.

Drs. Mitchell and Jessen state that it is regrettable that Mr. Rahman, Mr. Salim, and Mr. Ben Soud suffered these abuses."

The remainder of the settlement terms remain confidential.

== Results of the Torture on bin Amin ==
While the CIA asserts torture led to the discovery of the location of Hambali, the evidence, including CIA records indicate that the intelligence that led to Hambali’s capture was based on signals intelligence, a CIA source, and Thai investigative activities in Thailand.

== Joint Review Task Force ==
On January 21, 2009, the day he was inaugurated, United States President Barack Obama issued three executive orders related to the detention of individuals in Guantanamo. That new review system was composed of officials from six departments, where the OARDEC reviews were conducted entirely by the Department of Defense. When it reported back, a year later, the Joint Review Task Force classified some individuals as too dangerous to be transferred from Guantanamo, even though there was no evidence to justify laying charges against them. On April 9, 2013, that document was made public after a Freedom of Information Act request. Mohammed Farik bin Amin was one of the 71 individuals deemed too innocent to charge, but too dangerous to release. Obama said those deemed too innocent to charge, but too dangerous to release would start to receive reviews from a Periodic Review Board.

== Periodic Review Board ==
The first review was not convened until November 20, 2013. As of 15 April 2016, 29 individuals had reviews, but Mohammed Farik bin Amin was not one of them. Bin Amin was denied approval for transfer on September 15, 2016.

== Trial ==
In August 2021, Mohammed Farik bin Amin, Mohammed Nazir bin Lep and Hambali were charged by the United States government with murder and terrorism for their involvement in the 2002 Bali bombings.

During the trial, bin Amin's defense lawyer showed bin Amin's drawings of his torture, including waterboarding and stress positions, as exhibits.

On January 26, 2024, a military jury at Guantánamo sentenced bin Amin and bin Lep to 23 years' confinement for their roles in the bombings. However, the sentence may be reduced to at most 6 years' confinement due to a secret deal the pair reached with a senior Pentagon official. They were granted the reduced sentence in exchange for agreeing to testify against Hambali.

On December 18, 2024, bin Amin and bin Lep were transferred to Malaysia.
