= Abdu Ali al Haji Sharqawi =

Yemeni alleged Al-Qaeda associate (born 1974)

Sharqawi Abdu Ali al-Hajj
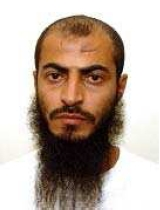
- Sharqawi Abdu Ali al-Hajj official Guantanamo portrait, showing him wearing the white uniform issued to compliant captives.
- Born: May 26, 1974 (age 52); Taiz, Yemen
- Arrested: February 2002; Karachi, Pakistan
- Detained at: CIA's black sites Guantanamo
- ISN: 1457
- Status: Released

Sharqawi Abdu Ali al-Hajj (born May 26, 1974 in Taiz, Yemen), also known as Riyadh the Facilitator, is a Yemeni alleged Al-Qaeda associate who was held in the United States' Guantanamo Bay detention camps, in Cuba. He was accused of being a "senior al-Qaida facilitator who swore an oath of allegiance to and personally recruited bodyguards for Osama Bin Laden".

Al-Hajj arrived at the Guantanamo detention camps on 20 September 2004, and was held there for 20 years.

== Transportation to Guantanamo Bay ==
Human Rights group Reprieve reports that flight records show two captives named Al-Sharqawi and Hassan bin Attash were flown from Kabul in September 2002. The two men were flown aboard N379P, a plane suspected to be part of the CIA's ghost fleet. Flight records showed that the plane originally departed from Diego Garcia, stopped in Morocco, Portugal, then Kabul before landing in Guantanamo Bay.

The Guardian reports that one of the two men has been released from US custody.

A differing report shows al-Hajj was arrested by the CIA in Karachi, Pakistan, in February 2002, and rendered to Jordan. He was transferred to Afghanistan in January 2004, where he was held at the CIA-run Dark Prison, then at Bagram Air Base, and then finally transferred to Guantanamo in September 2004.

== Extraordinary rendition ==
Sharqawi Abdu Ali al-Hajj has written that after his capture, in February 2002, in Pakistan he spent two years in CIA custody in foreign interrogation centers, prior to his transfer to Guantanamo, in February 2004: He writes that he spent 19 months in Amman, Jordan, and then five months in a secret interrogation center. While in Jordan he had been handed over to the custody of Jordan's General Intelligence Department. He wrote:

- I was kidnapped, not knowing anything of my fate, with continuous torture and interrogation for the whole of two years. When I told them the truth, I was tortured and beaten.
- I was told that if I wanted to leave with permanent disability both mental and physical, that that could be arranged. They said they had all the facilities of Jordan to achieve that. I was told that I had to talk, I had to tell them everything.

== Official status reviews ==
Originally the Bush Presidency asserted that captives apprehended in the "war on terror" were not covered by the Geneva Conventions, and could be held indefinitely, without charge, and without an open and transparent review of the justifications for their detention. In 2004 the United States Supreme Court ruled, in Rasul v. Bush, that Guantanamo captives were entitled to being informed of the allegations justifying their detention, and were entitled to try to refute them.

=== Office for the Administrative Review of Detained Enemy Combatants ===
Combatant Status Review Tribunals were held in a 3-by-5-metre (10 ft × 16 ft) trailer where the captive sat with his hands and feet shackled to a bolt in the floor.

Following the Supreme Court's ruling the Department of Defense set up the Office for the Administrative Review of Detained Enemy Combatants.

Scholars at the Brookings Institution, led by Benjamin Wittes, listed the captives still held in Guantanamo in December 2008, according to whether their detention was justified by certain common allegations.:

- Sharqawi Abdu Ali al-Hajj was listed as one of the captives who "The military alleges ... are members of Al Qaeda."
- Sharqawi Abdu Ali al-Hajj was listed as one of the captives who "The military alleges ... were at Tora Bora."
- Sharqawi Abdu Ali al-Hajj was listed as one of the captives who "The military alleges ... served on Osama Bin Laden’s security detail."
- Sharqawi Abdu Ali al-Hajj was listed as one of the captives who was a member of the "al Qaeda leadership cadre".
- Sharqawi Abdu Ali al-Hajj was listed as one of the "82 detainees made no statement to CSRT or ARB tribunals or made statements that do not bear materially on the military’s allegations against them."

=== Habeas Corpus ===
In June 2011, a federal Judge ruled that the Obama administration can not use certain statements al-Hajj gave to justify his detention because the government did not rebut claims of torture in Jordan and Afghanistan. But the same judge rejected a defense attempt to suppress an incriminating statement al-Hajj made before his claims of torture.

=== Formerly secret Joint Task Force Guantanamo assessment ===
On 25 April 2011, whistleblower organization WikiLeaks published formerly secret assessments drafted by Joint Task Force Guantanamo analysts. His 11-page Joint Task Force Guantanamo assessment was drafted on 20 July 2008. It was signed by camp commandant Rear Admiral David M Thomas Jr. He recommended continued detention.

=== Joint Review Task Force ===
When he assumed office in January 2009, President Barack Obama made a number of promises about the future of Guantanamo. He promised to institute a new review system. That new review system was composed of officials from six departments, where the OARDEC reviews were conducted entirely by the Department of Defense. When it reported back, a year later, the Joint Review Task Force classified some individuals as too dangerous to be transferred from Guantanamo, even though there was no evidence to justify laying charges against them. On 9 April 2013, that document was made public after a Freedom of Information Act request. Sharqawi Abdu Ali al-Hajj was one of the 71 individuals deemed too innocent to charge, but too dangerous to release. Al-Hajj was approved for transfer on 8 June 2021.

== Release ==
Al-Hajj and 10 other detainees were transferred to Oman on January 6, 2025.
