= Hayatullah Khan (Taliban leader) =

Afghan Taliban leader and spokesman

- Hayatullah Khan in 2007
- Born: 1972 (age 53–54)
- Known for: Senior Taliban leader and spokesman

Mullah Hayatullah Khan is a Taliban leader and spokesman. In 2004 Khan informed journalists that the Taliban's leadership were in Afghanistan, not taking sanctuary in Balochistan. When Hayatullah Khan made his first statement, in 2004, President of Afghanistan Hamid Karzai said "Who is this Taliban commander Hayatullah Khan who made this claim? I have never heard his name and probably you also don’t know him.".

In February 2007 he was quoted about the Taliban's capture of Musa Qala. He asserted that the Taliban had over 300 fighters in Musa Qala. He said that the Taliban had thousands of individuals who had volunteered to be suicide bombers.

In April 2007 he told the Daily Times that the Taliban had Afghans who were willing to serve as suicide bombers waiting to attack in major cities in Afghanistan.

In October 2007 he asserted that the Taliban had played no role in the assassination attempt of Benazir Bhutto. He said that “The Afghan Taliban are not involved in attacks in foreign countries.”

In an interview with Reuters in November 2007 he described managing hundreds of suicide bombers.

He told Reuters:

"Next year, 2008, will be the bloodiest year for U.S. and coalition forces in Afghanistan and we will make the Afghan land a graveyard for foreign forces,"

Hayatullah Khan issued the Taliban's reaction on January 20, 2009, the day Barack Obama was inaugurated. He promised that "The increase of U.S. forces by Obama will provide us fresh and easy targets. Mujahideen are preparing, and as soon as winter goes, an intensity will be seen in our attacks in Afghanistan."

In 2009 Hayatullah Khan reappeared again, and again asserted that the Taliban's leadership was in Afghanistan, not Pakistan. He said that Pakistan was more dangerous for the Taliban's leadership than Afghanistan. He denied the existence of the Quetta Shura.
