= Ghost detainee =

Unregistered US government prisoner

Ghost detainee is a term used in the executive branch of the United States government to designate a person held in a detention center whose identity has been hidden by keeping them unregistered and therefore anonymous. Such uses arose as the Bush administration initiated the war on terror following the 9/11 attacks of 2001 in the United States. As documented in the 2004 Taguba Report, it was used in the same manner by United States officials and contractors of the Joint Interrogation and Debriefing Center at the Abu Ghraib prison in Iraq in 2003–2004.

== Secret CIA prisons ==
According to then-director of the Central Intelligence Agency Michael Hayden in 2007, the CIA had detained up to 100 people at secret facilities abroad known as black sites since the 2002 capture of the suspected al Qaeda operative Abu Zubaydah.

One example is Khalid El-Masri, a German citizen abducted by the CIA in Macedonia in January 2004. He was taken to a CIA black site in Afghanistan, known as the Salt Pit, for questioning under 'enhanced interrogation techniques' (torture) before he was determined to be innocent in March and eventually released in May 2004 after some additional delays. His abduction was said to be a case of mistaken identity. Germany initially claimed that it did not know of el-Masri's abduction until his return to the country in May 2004. But, on June 1, 2006, the BND (German intelligence agency) declared that it had known of El-Masri's seizure 16 months before Germany was officially informed of his arrest.

In a 2007 report, Human Rights Watch related the claims of an alleged ghost detainee, Marwan Jabour, a Palestinian who was arrested in Lahore, Pakistan, in May 2004. He claimed to have been held for more than a month in a secret detention facility operated by Pakistanis and Americans in Islamabad. He was flown to a CIA prison in Afghanistan, where he was held in secret, incommunicado detention for more than two years. During his ordeal, he was tortured, beaten, forced to stay awake for days, and kept naked and chained to a wall for more than a month.

At least 39 detainees who the CIA once held in secret detention remain "disappeared," according to Off the Record, a report jointly published June 7, 2007 by six leading human rights groups, including Amnesty International, the Center for Constitutional Rights, the Center for Human Rights and Global Justice, and Human Rights Watch. Spokesmen say that their report

reveals the extent to which the United States has illegally used "proxy detention" to empty its secret sites and demonstrates that far from targeting the "worst of the worst," the system sweeps up low-level detainees and even involves the detention of the wives and children of the "disappeared," in violation of their human rights. 'Off the Record' also documents allegations concerning the treatment of detainees while in secret detention, including torture and other cruel, inhuman or degrading treatment or punishment.

== Abu Ghraib's ghost detainees ==
The practice of ghosting first achieved widespread attention in 2005 when The Washington Post broke a story suggesting that the U.S. Army and the CIA were detaining "unlawful enemy combatants" at the Abu Ghraib prison in Iraq with little or no due process. According to the article, the CIA asked military intelligence officials to let them house ghost detainees at Abu Ghraib by September 2003 and proposed a memorandum of understanding between the agencies on the topic that November. The Army and the Defense Department have acknowledged that the United States has used ghosting in the past, but have said it was limited to isolated incidents. According to documents obtained by the Post, "unregistered CIA detainees were brought to Abu Ghraib several times a week in late 2003."

The Post cited as evidence the 2004 report by Major General Antonio Taguba:

[I]n a report describing abuses of detainees at the Abu Ghraib prison near Baghdad, [he] blamed the 800th Military Police Brigade, which guarded the prison, for allowing 'other government agencies' — a euphemism that includes the CIA — to hide 'ghost' detainees at Abu Ghraib. The practice, he wrote, 'was deceptive, contrary to Army doctrine, and in violation of international law'.

When news of a detainee known only as Triple X became known to the public in late 2003, U.S. secretary of defense Donald Rumsfeld was questioned about him. Rumsfeld was evasive, and speculated about why someone would want to keep a prisoner hidden from the Red Cross. This is considered a war crime under international law.

On September 9, 2004, General Paul J. Kern testified before the Senate Armed Services Committee, stating that an inquiry he led found that the Army had cooperated with the CIA in hiding dozens of ghost detainees from the Red Cross. Kern told the Committee there may have been as many as 100 ghost detainees.

== Criticism ==
The practice has been criticized by Amnesty International, Human Rights Watch and other non-governmental organizations (NGOs) as improper and illegal; it prevents these prisoners from having contact with inspectors and human rights advocates, and the families of the prisoners have to deal with a "forced disappearance". One 2005 report by Amnesty International indicated that more than 100 ghost detainees may have been held in U.S.-operated black sites at the time of publication.

In May 2005, Irene Khan of Amnesty International addressed the issue in a speech:

According to U.S. official sources there could be over one hundred ghost detainees held by the U.S. In 2004, thousands of people were held by the U.S. in Iraq, hundreds in Afghanistan, and undisclosed numbers in undisclosed locations. AI (Amnesty International) is calling on the U.S. government to "close Guantanamo and disclose the rest." What we mean by this is: either release the prisoners or charge and prosecute them with due process.

== See also ==
- Black jails (China)
- Nacht und Nebel (Nazi Germany)
- Black sites
- Command responsibility
- "Enemy combatants", a legal status recognized under the Geneva Conventions- concerning prisoners of war and civilians
- Forced disappearance
- Extraordinary rendition
