= Hayatullah Khan (journalist) =

Pakistani journalist (1976–2006)

- Born: 1976
- Died: 2006 (aged 29–30); Waziristan, Pakistan
- Occupation: Journalist
- Notable credit: Ausaf
- Spouse: Deceased
- Children: 5

Hayatullah Khan (1976–2006) was a Pakistani journalist who reported from Pakistan's Federally Administered Tribal Areas bordering Afghanistan. Khan wrote extensively on Al-Qaeda, Taliban and the heavy fighting among tribes in Waziristan, where he was found dead six months after his reporting contradicted Pakistan's official statements. He reported from the border between Pakistan and Afghanistan, which at the time was one of the most dangerous places in the world.

== Career ==
Hayatullah Khan was a journalist for the Urdu-language daily Ausaf and his work was distributed through the European Pressphoto Agency. He took 14 hours of videotape for the PBS Frontline documentary Return of The Taliban (2002). He also worked as a fixer for foreign journalists, and according to Eliza Griswold, he could charge high fees because of the dangers in Waziristan and his strong work ethic and experience.

On 7 August 2001, the Committee to Protect Journalists wrote a letter to the Pakistan military dictator, Gen. Pervez Musharraf, after Hayatullah Khan had gone into hiding when the government threatened him with arrest because of his reports about skirmishes among tribes in the Waziristan region.

== Death ==
On 5 December 2005, Khan was kidnapped by five unidentified gunmen. His brother, Haseenullah, witnessed the kidnapping. His body was discovered in June 2006. According to The Daily Times, one of the mysteries surrounding his death was that his kidnappers had kept him alive for the six months his whereabouts were unknown.

Just days before his kidnapping, the Pakistani authorities had said that an al-Qaeda commander, Abu Hamza Rabia, had been killed with four others in a blast at an alleged militant hideout in North Waziristan. The official version of events was that bomb-making materials had exploded by accident, but locals said the men were killed by a missile fired from an unmanned US drone. Khan took photographs of what appeared to be pieces of an American Hellfire missile at the scene. The pictures provoked angry protests in Pakistan at the infringement of Pakistani territory by US forces. While both the authorities and local militant groups denied any involvement in Khan's killing, allegations persisted that Pakistan's intelligence agencies were involved.

On 17 November 2007, Hayatullah's widow was murdered in a bomb explosion outside her home. Preliminary evidence indicated that she was the target of the attack. According to Daily Times, she had stated in an interview that her husband had warned her "something" might happen to him, and had named individuals who would know why he had been killed. Her death left their five young children orphaned.

Investigative journalist Umar Cheema, writing for the Committee to Protect Journalists, observed that while a judicial inquiry was conducted, its findings were never made public, and no police investigation ever took place.

== Impact ==
Khan was the fifth, and most high-profile, journalist to be killed in Waziristan in two years, where working conditions for journalists are very hostile who face death threats from the Taliban and harassment from the military.

According to the Tribal Union of Journalists in Pakistan, the number of local journalist had diminished as a result of the dangers in Waziristan. As a result of his death, journalists went on strike and the Pakistan government began an investigation, but no report has ever been released.

== See also ==
- Frontier Crimes Regulations
- Inter-Services Intelligence
- List of Pakistani journalists
