= Laid Saidi =

Algerian falsely imprisoned and tortured by the CIA

- Born: c. 1963 (age 62–63); Algeria
- Arrested: 10 May 2003; Tanzania
- Released: August 2004; Tunisia
- Detained at: The Salt Pit
- Other name: Ramzi ben Mizauni ben Fraj
- Charge: None
- Penalty: Extrajudicial detention
- Status: Released
- Occupation: Charity branch director (former)

Laid Saidi (born c. 1963) is an Algerian who was imprisoned for 16 months in a CIA black site in Afghanistan called the "Salt Pit". Saidi claims to have spent months in the dark prison prior to his detention in the Salt Pit.

== Capture and torture ==
He was apprehended because of a taped telephone conversation in which the word tayrat (تايرات), meaning "tires" in colloquial Arabic, was mistaken for a similarly sounding word, Tayrat (طايرات, pronounced with a slightly different "T" sound) meaning "airplanes."

Saidi worked for Al-Haramain Foundation, a Saudi charity organization. He was arrested in Tanzania in July 2003 and rendered to Afghanistan via Malawi, where he was "handed over to Malawian authorities in plainclothes who were accompanied by two middle-aged Caucasian men wearing jeans and t-shirts."

== Aftermath ==
Saidi said that scars on his wrists were from being suspended from the ceiling by his hands. American officials assert that they stopped using this form of torture after it led to the deaths of two Afghans, Habibullah and Dilawar in Bagram, in December 2002. Saidi described months of confusing interrogations, during which his interrogators kept insisting that he had spoken cryptically of planes during a telephone conversation. When the tape the Americans had made of this conversation was finally played for him, Saidi described being surprised to realize all these questions and torture were due to a simple misunderstanding that could have easily been explained, without months of torture.

Following the release of the 600-page unclassified summary of the United States Senate Intelligence Committee's report on CIA torture, further details of the CIA's torture of him were made public.
