= Salt Pit =

Former CIA prison in Afghanistan

Coordinates: 34°34′36.48″N 69°17′25.80″E

Photograph of the Salt Pit taken by Trevor Paglen in 2006

Salt Pit and Cobalt were the code names of an isolated clandestine CIA black site prison and interrogation center outside Bagram Air Base in Afghanistan. It was located north of Kabul and was the location of a brick factory prior to the war in Afghanistan. The CIA adapted it for extrajudicial detention.

In the winter of 2005, the Salt Pit became known to the general public because of two incidents. In 2011, the Miami Herald indicated that the Salt Pit was the same facility that Guantanamo Bay detainees referred to as the dark prison—a fact subsequently confirmed in the CIA torture report.

Beginning in April 2021, until the final withdrawal of U.S. troops from Afghanistan, large sections of the Salt Pit were demolished by the departing personnel before the Taliban gained control of the site.

== Description ==
Although the initial plan called for the Afghan government to operate the site, it actually was overseen by the CIA from the start. The CIA authorized more than $200,000 for the construction of the prison in June 2002; the site became operational with the incarceration of Redha al-Najar in September 2002, although the first formal guidelines for interrogation and confinement at the site were signed by the Director of Central Intelligence George Tenet only in late January 2003. Ultimately, the prison housed, at one point or another, nearly half of the 119 detainees identified by the Senate Intelligence Committee report on CIA torture.

The CIA used many different techniques and tactics to break down the detainees' minds, making them more willing to comply with interrogation. The prison was dark at all times, with curtains and painted exterior windows. Loud music was played constantly. The prisoners were kept in total darkness and isolation, with only a bucket for human waste and without sufficient heat in winter months. Nude prisoners were kept in a central area and walked around as a form of humiliation. The detainees were hosed down with water while shackled naked and placed in cold cells. They were subject to sleep deprivation, shackled to bars with their hands above their heads. Four of 20 cells of the prison had bars across the cell to facilitate this.

One senior interrogator said that his team found a detainee who had been chained in a standing position for 17 days, "as far as we could determine." A senior CIA debriefer told the CIA Inspector General that she heard stories of detainees hung for days on end with their toes barely touching the ground, choked, being deprived of food, and made the subject of a mock execution. There are almost no detailed records of the detentions and interrogations during the earliest days of the site's existence.

Throughout interviews conducted in 2003 with the CIA Office of Inspector General, top CIA leadership and attorneys claimed they had little knowledge of the site operations. Both the Director of Central Intelligence George Tenet and CIA General Counsel Scott Muller have claimed they were "not very familiar" with the detention site. In August 2003, Muller said that he believed the site was merely a holding facility. The Inspector General review also found that there were no guidelines for "enhanced interrogation techniques" at the site, and that some interrogators were "left to their own devices" with prisoners.

== The Dark Prison ==
The dark prison is the informal name used by some Guantanamo Bay detainees for a secret prison in which they claim they were detained near Kabul, Afghanistan. This is now identified with the Salt Pit. According to an article distributed by Reuters, eight Guantanamo detainees have described the conditions they were held under in "the dark prison".

Detainees claimed that they were detained in complete darkness for weeks on end. They were chained to bars in small, tight places, and were forced to stay in the same uncomfortable position. They described being deprived of food and water and being given filthy food and water when they were fed. The prisoners' details have been consistent, saying that the guards did not wear military uniforms—prompting Human Rights Watch to suggest it was run as a black site by the Central Intelligence Agency. One prisoner reported being threatened with rape. In 2011, The Miami Herald reported that the Dark Prison is another name for the Salt Pit. Two Afghan captives died there in 2005 and a Department of Defense investigation finally concluded they had been murdered, as some detainees had claimed.

=== Detainees who claimed to have been detained in the dark prison ===
| Jamil al-Banna | arrested in Gambia with Bisher al-Rawi and others; transported to the black site; detained at Guantanamo Bay from March 2003 to 19 December 2007 |
| Abd al-Salam Ali al-Hila | detained in Camp Delta |
| Bisher al-Rawi | arrested in Gambia with Jamil al-Banna; detained in the Guantanamo Bay detention camps until March 2007; released after the British public learned he had been co-operating with MI5 in their surveillance of Abu Qatada |
| Hassin Bin Attash | claims he was tortured in the black sites; 17 when captured; detained in Camp Delta; brother of Waleed Muhammad bin Attash |
| Binyam Mohammed | claims he was tortured in the black sites; detained in the Guantanamo Bay detention camps until February 2009; US government claimed he was a co-conspirator of Jose Padilla in a bombing plot, but dropped charges |
| Ammar al-Baluchi | According to a report by the CIA's Office of Inspector General, he was used as a "training prop" for torture techniques.; Suffered brain damage from interrogators repeatedly slamming his head into a wall. |
| Laid Saidi | Saidi worked for the Al-Haramain Foundation in Tanzania; captured 10 May 2003.; Was detained in "Salt Pit" at the same time as Khaled el-Masri, a German resident abducted while on vacation in North Macedonia. |
| Sanad al-Kazimi | Alleges he was beaten with electric cables and attempted suicide three times in the prison. |
| Hayatullah | Held in "the black prison" for forty days before being transferred to Bagram, Afghanistan, in 2007.; Reports that the walls of the prison are concrete blocks. Captives who had been held there a long time say they were originally plywood, painted black.; Believed the prison was near Bagram base, and was also called "Tor Jail". |

== Death in custody ==
Gul Rahman is the only publicly known death from the Salt Pit. He was arrested and tortured because he was thought to be an Afghan militant. The recently assigned CIA case officer in charge of the prison directed the Afghan guards to strip Gul Rahman naked from the waist down, chain him to the floor of his unheated cell, and leave him overnight, according to the Associated Press. Rahman was captured in Islamabad on 29 October 2002. On the morning of 20 November 2002, he was found dead in his cell. A post-mortem examination determined that he had frozen to death. The Washington Post described the CIA camp commandant as "newly minted", on his first assignment. ABC News called the CIA camp commandant "a young, untrained junior officer". The Washington Post's sources noted that the CIA camp commandant had subsequently been promoted. The commandant was later identified as Matthew Zirbel. The Senate Intelligence Committee report on CIA torture revealed that no CIA employees were disciplined as a result of his death. After further investigation, there have been many more cases where the CIA has not taken responsibility nor faced repercussions for their actions.

Rahman was buried in an unmarked grave, and his friends and family were never told of what happened to him. They learned of his fate in 2010 after an AP story revealed Rahman had died at Salt Pit.

== Khalid El-Masri ==
Khalid El-Masri, a German citizen, was kidnapped from the Republic of Macedonia and rendered to Afghanistan. El-Masri's name was similar to that of Khalid al-Masri, a terror suspect; the Macedonian authorities thought he might be traveling on a forged passport, and notified the regional CIA station. A team of American CIA officials were dispatched to the Republic of Macedonia, where they kidnapped El-Masri after he was released by the Macedonian officers, but without regard to his legal rights under Macedonian law. It took over two months for the CIA official who ordered his arrest to assess whether El-Masri's passport was legitimate. El-Masri described being beaten and injected with drugs as part of his interrogation.

On 18 May 2006 U.S. Federal District Judge T.S. Ellis, III of the Eastern District of Virginia dismissed a lawsuit El-Masri filed against the CIA and three private companies allegedly involved with his transport, stating that a public trial would "present a grave risk of injury to national security." A Court of Appeals also dismissed the case.

On 9 October 2007 the U.S Supreme Court declined to hear El-Masri's appeal of the lower courts, without comment.

== Bureau of Prisons inspection ==
On 21 November 2016, CBS News reported that an inspection of the Salt Pit, from officials from the United States Bureau of Prisons (BOP), had been confirmed through Freedom of Information Act (FOIA) lawsuits. The Bureau of Prison inspection first became public knowledge when the United States Senate Intelligence Committee published its 600-page unclassified summary of its (then-classified) 6,700 page report on the CIA's use of torture. The Bureau of Prison denied sending inspectors. The American Civil Liberties Union then filed FOIA requests for information about the inspections. When the Bureau of Prisons declined to honor the requests, the ACLU took the matter to court.

According to CBS News: "The admission came Thursday in response to a lawsuit filed by the ACLU, which sued in April after the Bureau of Prisons denied having any record of involvement with the detention site." In the November filing, the Bureau of Prisons acknowledged that two officials had visited the prison in 2002, but said that they had not technically lied when they denied having any record of the visit, because the CIA had instructed the BOP not to keep any record of the visit to be maintained.

The CBS News report quoted extensively from the Senate report's coverage of the visit. Their report stated that although Gul Rahman died during the BOP inspection, the CIA's records stated that the BOP inspectors "determined the site was 'not inhumane'". Furthermore, they described the detainees as "dogs that had been kenneled" since they scurried away in fear when their cell doors opened.

CBS News first covered the suggestion the BOP inspected the prison in June 2015. One of the documents the BOP published in response to the FOIA request was an email, in which an official (whose name was redacted) forwarded a link to the CBS article together with the comment, "They just won't let it go."

== See also ==
- List of prisons in Afghanistan
- Black site
- Extrajudicial prisoners of the United States
