= Abdul Rahim al-Nashiri =

Guantanamo captive

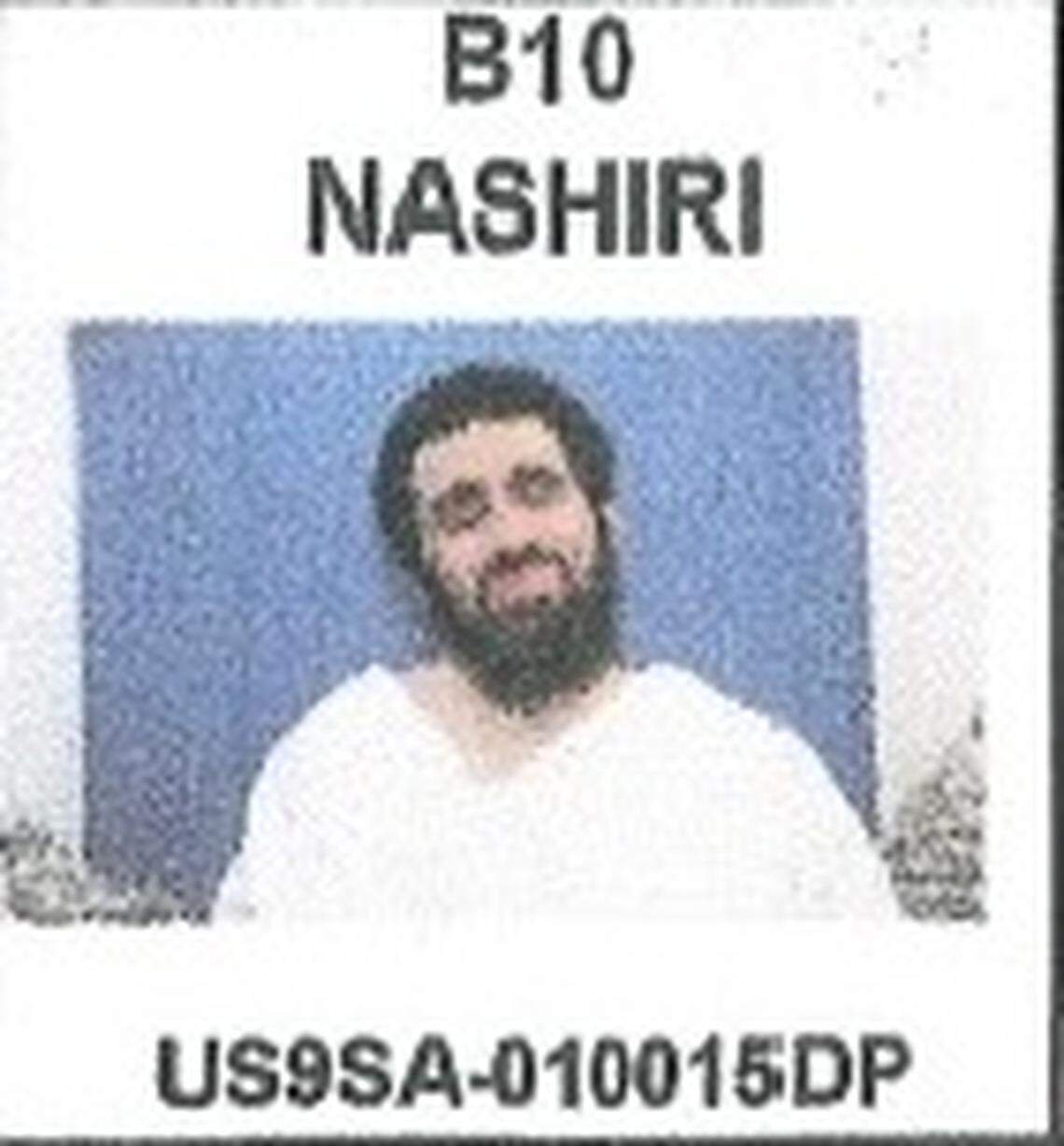
- al-Nashiri's mugshot that was taken after he was transferred to Guantanamo in September 2006
- Born: January 5, 1965 (age 61); Mecca, Saudi Arabia
- Citizenship: Saudi Arabian
- Detained at: CIA black sites Guantanamo Bay
- Other name: Mullah Bilal
- ISN: 10015
- Charge: Charges dropped in February 2009, reinstated in 2011
- Status: Still held in Guantanamo Bay pending trial

Abdul Rahim Hussein Muhammed Abdu al-Nashiri (Arabic: عبد الرحيم حسين محمد عبده النشري; or Abd al-Rahim al-Nashiri; born January 5, 1965) is a Saudi Arabian citizen of Yemeni descent alleged to be the mastermind of the bombing of USS Cole and other maritime attacks. He is alleged to have headed al-Qaeda operations in the Persian Gulf region and the Arab states in the Persian Gulf prior to his capture in November 2002 by the CIA's Special Activities Division.

Al-Nashiri was captured in Dubai in 2002 and held for four years in secret CIA prisons known as "black sites" in Afghanistan, Thailand, Poland, Morocco and Romania, before being transferred to the Guantanamo Bay detention camp. While being interrogated, al-Nashiri was tortured by being waterboarded. In 2005 the CIA destroyed the tapes of Nashiri's waterboarding. In another incident he was stripped naked, hooded and threatened with a gun and a power drill to scare him into talking. Al-Nashiri was granted victim status in 2010 by the Polish government and a Polish prosecutor began "investigating the possible abuse of power by Polish public officials with regard to a CIA black site" in the country in 2008.

In December 2008, al-Nashiri was charged by the United States before a Guantanamo Military Commission. The charges were dropped in February 2009 and reinstated in 2011. As of 2011, al-Nashiri is on trial before a military tribunal in Guantanamo on charges of war crimes that carry the death penalty. As it is extremely unlikely he would be freed if found not guilty, his lawyers have called the proceeding a show trial.

In April 2019, a three judge panel of the United States Court of Appeals for the District of Columbia Circuit vacated all orders issued by Air Force Colonel Vance Spath, the presiding military judge over al-Nashiri's case from November 2015, on the grounds that Spath had failed to properly disclose his ongoing employment negotiations with the Department of Justice to al-Nashiri.

== Background ==
Born in Saudi Arabia to a family of Yemeni descent, al-Nashiri travelled to Afghanistan in the early 1990s to participate in attacks against the Russians in the region, at a time when the United States supported the mujahideen in such actions. In 1996, he travelled to Tajikistan and then Jalalabad, Afghanistan, where he first met Osama bin Laden. Bin Laden attempted to convince al-Nashiri to join al-Qaeda at this point, but he refused because he found the idea of swearing a loyalty oath to bin Laden to be distasteful. After al-Nashiri travelled to Yemen, he is alleged to have begun to consider committing terrorist actions against United States interests.

When he returned to Afghanistan in 1997, he again met bin Laden, but again declined to join in the terrorist group. Instead, he fought with the Taliban against the Afghan Northern Alliance. Still, he assisted in the smuggling of four anti-tank missiles into Saudi Arabia, and helped arrange for a terrorist to get a Yemeni passport. His cousin, Jihad Mohammad Ali al-Makki, was one of the suicide bombers in the 1998 U.S. embassy bombings in Kenya.

== Allegedly joined al-Qaeda ==
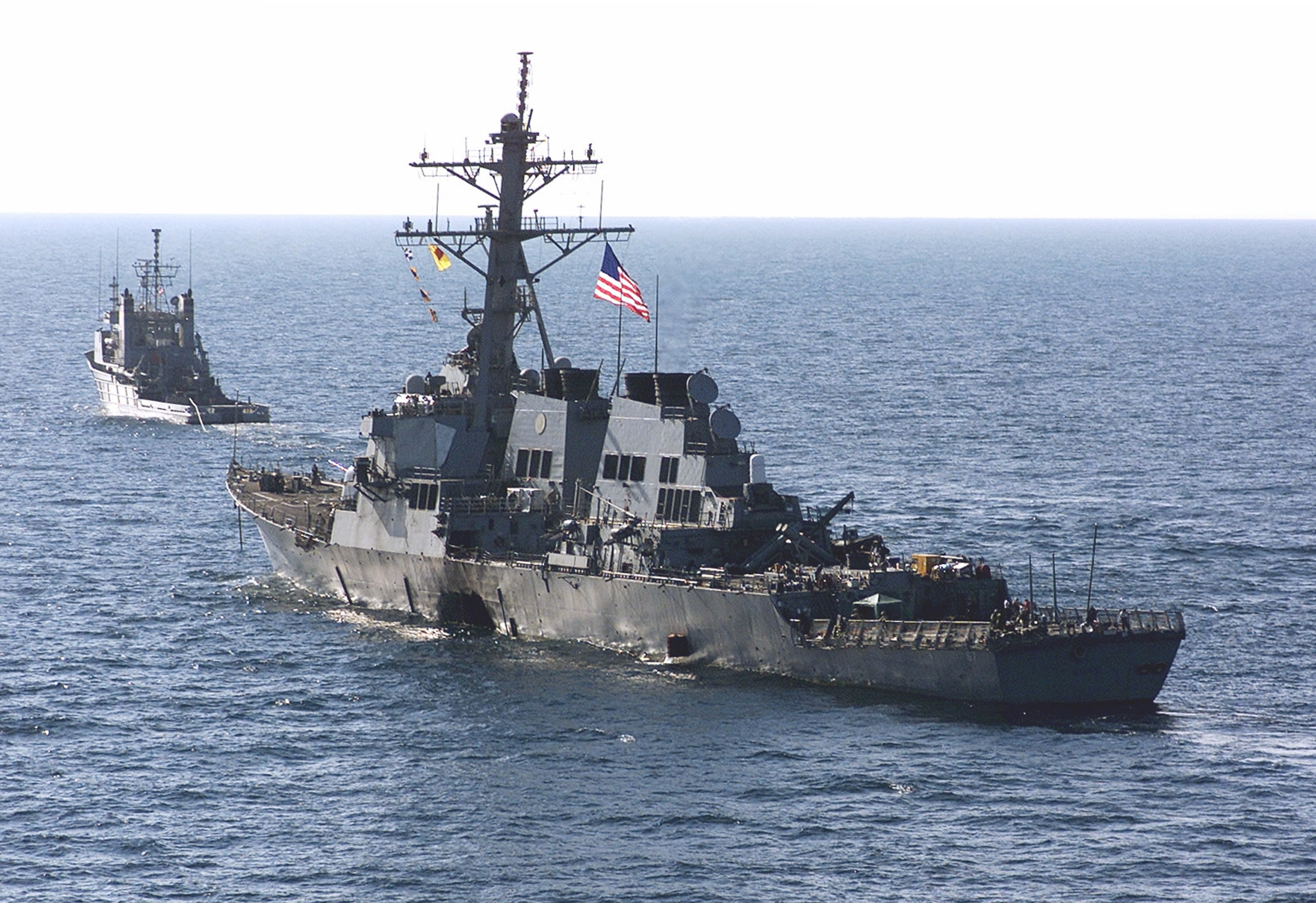
USS Cole is towed away from the port city of Aden, Yemen, into open sea on October 29, 2000.

Finally, probably in 1998, al-Nashiri is alleged to have joined al-Qaeda, reporting directly to bin Laden. In late 1998, he conceived of a plot to attack a U.S. vessel using a boat full of explosives. Bin Laden personally approved of the plan, and provided money for it. First, al-Nashiri allegedly attempted to attack USS The Sullivans as a part of the 2000 millennium attack plots, but the boat he used was overloaded with explosives and began to sink.

The next attempt was the USS Cole bombing, which was successful. Seventeen U.S. sailors were killed, and many more were injured. This terrorist attack made al-Nashiri prominent within al-Qaeda, and he allegedly was made the chief of operations for the Arabian Peninsula. He organized the Limburg tanker bombing in 2002 of a French-flagged vessel off Yemen, and he may have planned other attacks as well.

== Arrest ==
In November 2002, al-Nashiri was captured in the United Arab Emirates. He is in American military custody in the Guantanamo Bay detention camp, having previously been held at some secret locations. On September 29, 2004, he was sentenced to death in absentia in a Yemeni court for his role in the USS Cole bombing. Before being transported to military custody at Guantanamo in September 2006, al-Nashiri was held by the CIA at black sites in Thailand and Poland for an undisclosed amount of time. CIA officials disagreed on al-Nashiri's role in planning the Cole bombing. One CIA official said of al-Nashiri, "He was an idiot. He couldn't read or comprehend a comic book."

== Combatant Status Review ==
The Department of Defense announced on August 9, 2007, that all fourteen of the "high-value detainees" who had been transferred to Guantanamo from the CIA's black sites, had been officially classified as "enemy combatants". Although judges Peter Brownback and Keith J. Allred had ruled two months earlier that only "illegal enemy combatants" could face military commissions, the Department of Defense waived the qualifier and said that all fourteen men could now face charges before Guantanamo military commissions.

== Interrogation ==
Abd al-Rahim al-Nashiri was interrogated numerous times. At a 2007 hearing in a military court, he attributed his confessions of involvement in the USS Cole bombing to torture, including waterboarding. The details of torture that Nashiri offered at the hearing were redacted from the transcript.

Through Freedom of Information Act requests, the American Civil Liberties Union was able to acquire less redacted versions of the transcripts from Abd al-Rahim al-Nashiri's Combatant Status Review Tribunal, and those of three other captives.

In his opening statement, al-Nashiri listed seven false confessions he had been coerced to make while being waterboarded.

1. The French Merchant Vessel Limburg incident.
2. The USS Cole bombing.
3. The rockets in Saudi Arabia.
4. The plan to bomb American ships in the Persian Gulf.
5. Relationship with people committing bombings in Saudi Arabia.
6. Osama Bin Laden having a nuclear bomb.
7. A plan to hijack a plane and crash it into a ship.

Al-Nashiri was tortured under the supervision of (then) current Director of the CIA Gina Haspel. A Navy Reserve doctor who interviewed him described him as "one of the most severely traumatized individuals I have ever seen". In August 2018, cables from the secret detention site overseen by Haspel, dating from November 2002 and likely authorized by if not written by her, were released because of a Freedom of Information lawsuit, and they describe the torture of Nashiri in detail, including slamming him against a wall, confining him to a small box, waterboarding him, and depriving him of sleep and clothing, as well as threatening to turn him over to others who would kill him and calling him “a little girl,” “a spoiled little rich Saudi,” and a “sissy.”

During the course of his tribunal, he claimed to have made additional confessions under the duress of torture. He was ostensibly the last of the al-Qaeda suspects to be videotaped, as he was waterboarded in Thailand by CIA officers who questioned him. Shortly after, when a prisoner died in CIA custody in Iraq, the government agents decided against videotaping such interrogations, as this provided criminal "evidence" if things went wrong. All the CIA tapes showing detainees being waterboarded were destroyed in 2005.

It was reported on August 22, 2009, that al-Nashiri was the subject of what is described as a mock execution during his torture by the CIA. A power drill and a handgun were used.

In May 2011, al-Nashiri's lawyers filed a case against Poland with the European Court of Human Rights. They said that Al-Nashiri was held and allegedly tortured in a secret CIA "black site" prison "north of Warsaw" from December 2002 to June 2003 with the collaboration or consent of the Polish government.

=== Order overruled ===
On January 29, 2009, an order from US president Obama's administration to suspend all Guantanamo military commission hearings for 120 days was overruled by military judge Army Colonel James Pohl in al-Nashiri's case.

=== Charges dropped ===
On February 5, 2009, al-Nashiri's charges were withdrawn without prejudice.

=== Charges re-instated ===
Since 2011, al-Nashiri has been at trial.

=== Death penalty ===
The prosecution planned to request the death penalty for al-Nashiri. The decision lies with the Convening authority, retired Admiral Bruce MacDonald. In April 2011, the Department of Defense allowed Richard Kammen, a civilian lawyer with a background in defending suspects against death penalty cases, to join al-Nashiri's defense team.

Al-Nashiri became the first Guantanamo captive to face the death penalty.

=== Request to end the prosecution ===
In a letter in July 2011, al-Nashiri's legal team said:

Through the infliction of physical and psychological abuse, the government has essentially already killed the man it seized almost 10 years ago.

and

By torturing Mr. Al-Nashiri and subjecting him to cruel, inhumane and degrading treatment, the United States has forfeited its right to try him and certainly to kill him,

=== Questioning whether Al Nashiri will continue to be detained if he is acquitted ===
On October 24, 2011, Lieutenant Commander Stephen Reyes filed a legal motion requesting that jurors in his case be informed that he may be detained in Guantanamo, even if he was acquitted of all charges. Al-Nashiri's formal charges are scheduled to be announced at the Tribunal on November 9, 2011.

Legal scholar Robert M. Chesney, of Lawfare, speculated al-Nashiri would be detained, if acquitted, for at least several more years. Chesney argued that it would be just to continue to detain al-Nashiri, even if he were acquitted, because conviction requires a higher standard of evidence than a habeas corpus petition.

Eligibility for military detention, according to a now-substantial body of habeas case law, turns on the preponderance of the evidence standard, as applied to a substantive test inquiring whether the person was a member of al Qaeda at the time of capture. One can satisfy that standard consistent with a military commission acquittal.

— Robert M. Chesney

=== Defense motions filed in April 2012 ===
Presiding Officer James L. Pohl considered several motions during a pre-trial hearing on April 11, 2012. He deferred rulings on many of them. He did rule to unshackle al-Nashiri for meetings with his lawyers, who had argued that he was traumatized by being shackled for years in secret CIA prisons and that being shackled during meetings impairs his ability to work with his lawyers.

=== Jose Rodriguez's dispute over al Nashiri's role ===
On May 8, 2012, Ali Soufan, al-Nashiri's original FBI interrogator, asked whether a recently published book by former CIA official Jose Rodriguez would undermine al-Nashiri's prosecution. Soufan's original FBI interrogation used the time-tested, legal technique of rapport-building. He has argued that the information derived from the suspect using this technique was reliable, whereas the confessions derived through torture were not.

Rodriguez was in over-all charge of the CIA's extended interrogation program. According to Soufan, Rodriquez's account of al Nashiri's role in the Cole bombing differed markedly from that of the prosecution. Rodriguez disputed that Al Nashiri had been the bombing's "mastermind", and agreed with a colleague who characterized him as "the dumbest terrorist I have ever met".

== Mental health examination ==
Presiding Officer James Pohl ruled on February 7, 2013, that an independent panel of mental health experts should examine Al Nashiri, and report on how the documented torture he was subjected to would affect his ability to assist in his own defense. Pohl called for the director of the Walter Reed National Military Medical Center to nominate the members of examination team. He called for the team to report back by April 1, 2013. The team is supposed to be given full access to al Nashiri's medical files, including the top secret records from his times in CIA custody. The assessment was requested by the prosecution.

Al Nashiri's defense team objected to the assessment, based on their doubts that a team appointed by the Office of Military Commissions could be relied upon. They called for the team to rely on the advice of Vincent Iacopino for how to interview Al Nashiri, without causing additional damage. Iacopino, a renowned expert on torture, had testified before the Military Commission on February 5, 2013, about the possible effects of torture on Al Nashiri.

According to Richard Kammen, Nashiri's chief lawyer, psychiatric expert Sondra Crosby believes Nashiri is "one of the most damaged victims of torture" she has ever examined.

On October 30, 2026, Army judge Colonel Matthew Fitzgerald ruled that Al Nashiri is mentally competent to stand trial, clearing the way for jury selection to start November 2, 2026.

== Military commission ==
In 2011, Vice Admiral Bruce E. MacDonald convened a Guantanamo military commission under the Military Commissions Act of 2009 to try al-Nashiri for the bombing of the USS Cole and the M/V Limburg and the attempted bombing of the USS The Sullivans (DDG-68). Al-Nashiri then sued Vice Admiral MacDonald in the United States District Court for the Western District of Washington to block the commission and in May 2012, U.S. District Judge Robert Jensen Bryan rejected al-Nashiri's claim. That judgment was affirmed by United States Court of Appeals for the Ninth Circuit Judges M. Margaret McKeown, Arthur Alarcón, and Sandra Segal Ikuta in December 2013.

On February 18, 2014, al-Nashiri attempted to fire his counsel, Rick Kammen. Judge Pohl granted a recess until February 19, 2014, to allow Kammen to attempt to repair the relationship with his client. If the two are unable to overcome their differences, al-Nashiri would be permitted to fire Kammen under current military commission rules.

In August 2014, al-Nashiri's military trial judge dismissed the charges relating to the M/V Limburg bombing. The Government appealed to the United States Court of Military Commission Review and al-Nashiri then petitioned the United States Court of Appeals for the District of Columbia Circuit for a writ of mandamus disqualifying the military judges. In June 2015, Circuit Judge Karen L. Henderson, joined by Judges Judith W. Rogers and Nina Pillard denied al-Nashiri's petition.

Al-Nashiri then sued President Barack Obama in the United States District Court for the District of Columbia, seeking an injunction preventing proceedings in his military commission trial until his writ of habeas corpus had been resolved. In December 2014, U.S. District Judge Richard W. Roberts held the case in abeyance pending resolution of al-Nashiri's military commission trial and so denied as moot al-Nashiri's lawsuit against the President. Judge Roberts reasoned that the abstention doctrine announced in Schlesinger v. Councilman (1975), which required judicial review of an ongoing court-martial to wait until it is completed, also applied to al-Nashiri's military commission. In August 2016, D.C. Circuit Judge Thomas B. Griffith, joined by Judge David B. Sentelle, affirmed that judgment, over the dissent of Judge David S. Tatel.

On October 18, 2016, the new military judge, Air Force Colonel Vance Spath took a step that Stephen Vladeck, a law professor and national security expert described as "unprecedented". Spath had United States Marshals take Stephen Gill, into custody, to compel him to testify at a pre-trial hearing. In 2018, Spath resigned and was retroactively disqualified by the D.C. Circuit in a case arising out of the Baker v. Spath controversy.

In 2021, Army Colonel Lanny Acosta overruled an objection by al-Nashiri's military lawyer, Brian L. Mizer, to the Chief Prosecutor, Mark S. Martins introduction of statements taken from al-Nashiri under torture in the CIA black sites as evidence. The matter became public after Mizer and Al-Nashiri's civilian lawyer, Michel Paradis, appealed Acosta's decision. This led to a public dispute between Martins and the Joe Biden administration over the use of evidence obtained by torture, prompting Martins to abruptly resign. The Biden Administration then reversed its position and the court of appeals reversed Acosta's decision.

== Baker v. Spath ==
In 2017, the Chief Defense Counsel Brig. Gen. John Baker authorized the mass resignation of al-Nashiri's defense team after al-Nashiri's lead lawyer, Richard Kammen, discovered secret monitoring equipment installed in his attorney-client meeting room. The military judge presiding over the al-Nashiri case, Colonel Vance Spath, ordered Baker to rescind his order returning the lawyers to the case. When Baker refused the order as illegal, Spath found Baker in contempt and ordered him put under house arrest in Guantanamo.

Baker filed a petition for a writ of habeas corpus in the United States District Court for the District of Columbia. While the case was pending, the Convening Authority for Military Commissions reduced Baker’s sentence and ordered him released from confinement. Soon after, United States District Judge Royce Lamberth granted Baker’s habeas corpus petition and vacated Spath’s finding of contempt.

In October 2018, al-Nashiri petitioned the United States Court of Appeals for the District of Columbia Circuit for a writ of mandamus and prohibition, seeking a vacatur of all military commission orders issued by Colonel Spath. Al-Nashiri's lawyer Michel Paradis, argued that Spath had failed to disclose his job application to the Department of Justice and the subsequent employment negotiations concerning an open position for an immigration judge in the Executive Office for Immigration Review, which created an appearance of bias, disqualifying Spath from presiding over al-Nashiri's military commission. Spath had retired on November 1, 2018, and was appointed by Attorney General Jeff Sessions as an immigration judge in October 2018. After oral arguments were held before a panel consisting of Judge Rogers, Tatel, and Griffith, the Court vacated all orders issued by Spath, concluding that "Spath’s job application to the Justice Department created a disqualifying appearance of partiality". In writing for a unanimous court, Tatel wrote:

Although a principle so basic to our system of laws should go without saying, we nonetheless feel compelled to restate it plainly here: criminal justice is a shared responsibility. Yet in this case, save for Al-Nashiri’s defense counsel, all elements of the military commission system—from the prosecution team to the Justice Department to the CMCR to the judge himself—failed to live up to that responsibility.

== European Court of Human Rights judgment ==
On July 24, 2014, the European Court of Human Rights (ECHR) ruled that Poland violated the European Convention on Human Rights when it cooperated with the U.S. by allowing the CIA to hold and torture al-Nashiri and Abu Zubaydah on its territory in 2002–2003. The court ordered the Polish government to pay each of the men 100,000 euros in damages. Additionally, the ECHR ordered the Polish government to disclose details of the men's detention and to seek diplomatic assurances from the United States that al-Nashiri will not be executed.

On May 31, 2018, the ECHR ruled that Romania was also complicit in CIA rendition and had suffered various ECHR violations. The court found that al-Nashiri had been within Romania's jurisdiction and that the country had been responsible for the violation of his rights under the convention. It also recommended that Romania conclude a full investigation into his case as quickly as possible and, if necessary, punish any officials responsible. The country should also seek assurances from the United States that al-Nashiri will not suffer the death penalty. Romania was ordered to pay 100,000 euros in damages to al-Nashiri.
