= Darrell S. Cole =

US Marine Corps Medal of Honor recipient (1920–1945)

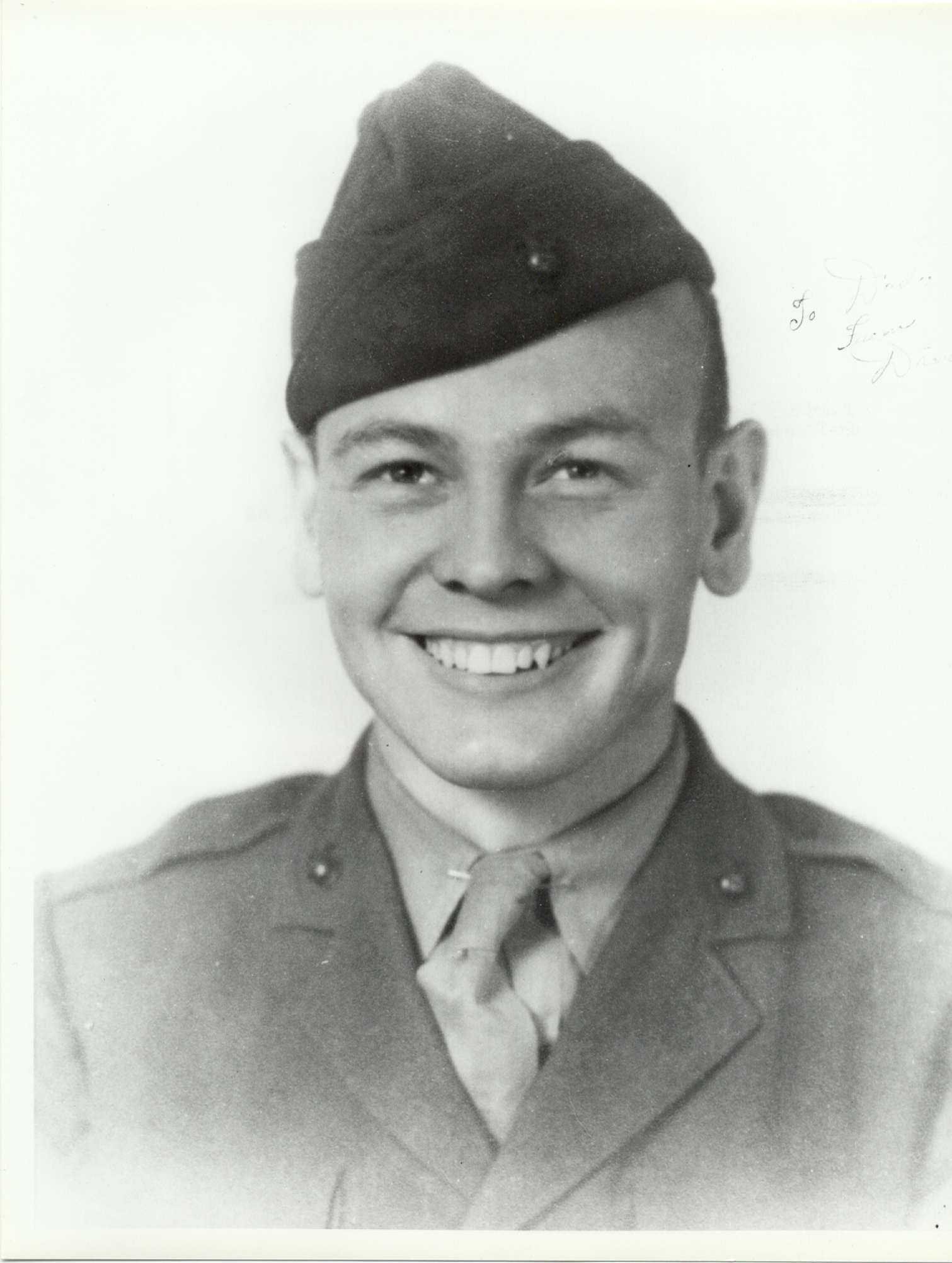
- Darrell S. Cole, Medal of Honor recipient
- Born: July 20, 1920; Park Hills, Missouri, US
- Died: February 19, 1945 (aged 24); Iwo Jima, Volcano Islands, Empire of Japan
- Burial place: Parkview Cemetery, Farmington, Missouri
- Military career
- Allegiance: United States of America
- Branch: United States Marine Corps
- Service years: 1941–1945
- Rank: Sergeant
- Unit: 1st Battalion, 23rd Marines
- Conflicts: World War II; Pacific War; Solomon Islands campaign; Guadalcanal campaign; Gilbert and Marshall Islands campaign; Battle of Kwajalein; Mariana and Palau Islands campaign; Battle of Tinian; Battle of Saipan; Japan campaign; Volcano and Ryukyu Islands campaign; Battle of Iwo Jima †
- Awards: Medal of Honor; Bronze Star; Purple Heart (2)

Sergeant Darrell Samuel Cole (July 20, 1920 – February 19, 1945) was a United States Marine who posthumously received the United States' highest military decoration, the Medal of Honor, for his conspicuous gallantry at the Battle of Iwo Jima during World War II.

Although he was originally assigned to play the bugle, Sergeant Cole repeatedly requested that his rating be changed from field musician to machine-gunner. Although rated as a bugler he fought as a machine-gunner in several major campaigns of World War II including Guadalcanal, Tinian, and Saipan.

On his fourth request to change his rating to machine-gunner the request was approved 4 months before he was sent into combat again on Iwo Jima. During the battle, Cole made a successful one-man attack against two gun emplacements impeding the advance of his company. Upon returning to his squad, he was killed by an enemy grenade.

In 1996 the United States Navy named USS Cole (DDG-67), a destroyer, in his honor. This destroyer was damaged in a suicide attack in Yemen but was subsequently repaired and returned to service in November 2003.

== Early life ==
Darrell Cole was born July 20, 1920, in Esther (now part of Park Hills), Missouri. He attended high school in Esther, graduating in 1938. Before graduating, his main interests were sports; particularly basketball, hunting and photography. He also learned to play the french horn which later led to him being assigned as a bugler.

After graduating from high school, he joined the Civilian Conservation Corps (CCC), where he became an assistant forestry clerk and assistant educational advisor for his company. He left after one year and he went to Detroit, Michigan where he worked at a company that made engine gaskets.

== Military service ==
On August 25, 1941, he enlisted in the Marine Corps. Following United States Marine Corps Recruit Training at MCRD Parris Island, South Carolina, he was appointed to the Field Music School for training as a Marine Corps Field Musician (a bugler). He was unhappy with being a field musician because he had joined the Marine Corps to fight. He applied for a change in rating to be a machine-gunner, but was refused due to the shortage of buglers. After completing field music school, he was transferred to the 1st Marine Regiment, 1st Marine Division.

After completing his first overseas tour, he returned to the United States in February 1943 and was assigned to the First Battalion, 23rd Marines, 4th Marine Division at Marine Corps Base Camp Lejeune, North Carolina. When his unit moved to California he again asked for relief as a field musician; and for permission to perform line duties. Again, due to the shortage of buglers in the Marine Corps, his request was denied. Throughout the course of World War II, until his death on Iwo Jima, Cole participated in several battles and campaigns as a machine-gunner and was promoted to the rank of sergeant in 1944.

=== Battle of Guadalcanal ===
The Battle of Guadalcanal was fought between August 7, 1942 and February 7, 1943, in the Pacific theatre of World War II and was the first major offensive launched by Allied forces against the Empire of Japan. Cole arrived on Guadalcanal on August 7, 1942, for the first American offensive of World War II; and his first opportunity to fill in as a machine-gunner in the absence of the regular gunner.

=== Battles of Kwajalein, Saipan and Tinian ===
After Guadalcanal, Cole served in several more battles throughout the Pacific theatre, including the battles of Kwajalein, Saipan and Tinian. The United States launched an assault on the main islands of Kwajalein in the south and Roi-Namur in the north from January 31, 1944, to February 3, 1944. The Japanese defenders put up a stiff resistance though outnumbered and under-prepared. Although the United States won the battle the determined defenses of Roi-Namur left only 51 Japanese survivors of an original garrison of 3,500. During this engagement of the 4th Division Cole, again forsaking his bugle, stepped in as a machine-gunner.

When Cole was sent to fight with his unit in Saipan, he was assigned to a machine gun unit; and was designated as a machine gun section leader. During the battle his squad leader was killed and Cole, although wounded, assumed command of the entire squad. He was awarded the Bronze Star for "…his resolute leadership, indomitable fighting spirit and tenacious determination in the face of terrific opposition." and was awarded the Purple Heart for the wounds he received.

When fighting began on the island of Tinian in the Mariana Islands from July 24 to August 1, 1944, Cole's unit was sent in a few days after the battle began. Cole again led his squad ashore in the invasion and defeat of the neighboring islands of Tinian; and continued to build his reputation as "The Fighting Field Musician."

=== Mariana and Palau Islands campaign ===
The Mariana and Palau Islands campaign was an offensive launched by United States forces against Imperial Japanese forces in the Mariana Islands and Palau in the Pacific Ocean, between June and November, 1944 during the Pacific War. It was after the Marianas campaign, that he submitted a request for a change of rating for the third time. Pointing out his experience and combat record, he stated that he felt he would be of more benefit to the Marine Corps performing line duties than those of field music. This time his request was approved and he was redesignated Corporal and subsequently promoted to Sergeant in November 1944.

=== Battle of Iwo Jima ===
The Battle of Iwo Jima was fought between the United States and the Empire of Japan, in February and March 1945 during the Pacific Campaign of World War II. Ground fighting on the island took place over approximately 36 days; lasting from the landings of February 17 to a final Japanese charge the morning of March 26, 1945. The U.S. invasion, known as Operation Detachment, was charged with the mission of capturing the island's airfields. The Japanese positions on the island were heavily fortified, with vast bunkers, hidden artillery, and 18 kilometers (11 mi) of tunnels.

On February 19, Sergeant Cole led his machine gun section ashore in the D-Day assault of Iwo Jima. Moving forward with the initial assault wave, a hail of fire from two enemy emplacements halted his section's advance. Sergeant Cole personally destroyed them with hand grenades. His unit continued to advance until pinned down for a second time by enemy fire from three Japanese gun emplacements. One of these emplacements was destroyed by a machine-gunner in Cole's squad. When his machine guns jammed, armed only with a pistol and one hand grenade, Sergeant Cole made a one-man attack against the two remaining gun emplacements. Twice he returned to his own lines for additional grenades and continued the attack under fierce enemy fire until he had succeeded in destroying the enemy strong points.

Upon returning to his own squad, he was killed by an enemy grenade. As a result of his one-man attack, Sergeant Cole's company could move forward against the fortifications and attain their ultimate objective. Sergeant Cole was initially buried in the 4th Marine Division Cemetery on Iwo Jima, but at the request of his father, his remains were returned to the United States to be buried in Parkview Cemetery, Farmington, Missouri.

== Honors and awards ==
=== Military decorations ===
In addition to the Medal of Honor and Bronze Star Medal, Sergeant Cole was awarded the Purple Heart with Gold Star in lieu of a second award, the Presidential Unit Citation, American Defense Service Medal, Asiatic-Pacific Campaign Medal, and the World War II Victory Medal.

Medal of Honor	Bronze Star Medal	Purple Heart with Gold Star in lieu of second award
Combat Action Ribbon	Navy Presidential Unit Citation	American Defense Service Medal
American Campaign Medal	Asiatic-Pacific Campaign Medal	World War II Victory Medal

==== Medal of Honor ====
Cole was posthumously awarded the Medal of Honor, which was presented to his widow on April 17, 1947. The citation reads as follows.

For conspicuous gallantry and intrepidity at the risk of his life above and beyond the call of duty while serving as Leader of a Machine-gun Section of Company B, First Battalion, Twenty-Third Marines, Fourth Marine Division, in action against enemy Japanese forces during the assault on Iwo Jima in the Volcano Islands, 19 February 1945. Assailed by a tremendous volume of small-arms, mortar and artillery fire as he advanced with one squad of his section in the initial assault wave, Sergeant Cole boldly led his men up the sloping beach toward Airfield Number One despite the blanketing curtain of flying shrapnel and, personally destroying with hand grenades two hostile emplacements which menaced the progress of his unit, continued to move forward until a merciless barrage of fire emanating from three Japanese pillboxes halted the advance. Instantly placing his one remaining machine gun in action, he delivered a shattering fusillade and succeeded in silencing the nearest and most threatening emplacement before his weapon jammed and the enemy, reopening fire with knee mortars and grenades, pinned down his unit for the second time. Shrewdly gauging the tactical situation and evolving a daring plan of counterattack, Sergeant Cole, armed solely with a pistol and one grenade, coolly advanced alone to the hostile pillboxes. Hurling his one grenade at the enemy in sudden, swift attack, he quickly withdrew, returned to his own lines for additional grenades and again advanced, attacked, and withdrew. With enemy guns still active, he ran the gauntlet of slashing fire a third time to complete the total destruction of the Japanese strong point and the annihilation of the defending garrison in this final assault. Although instantly killed by an enemy grenade as he returned to his squad, Sergeant Cole had eliminated a formidable Japanese position, thereby enabling his company to storm the remaining fortifications, continue the advance and seize the objective. By his dauntless initiative, unfaltering courage and indomitable determination during a critical period of action, Sergeant Cole served as an inspiration to his comrades, and his stouthearted leadership in the face of almost certain death sustained and enhanced the highest traditions of the United States Naval Service. He gallantly gave his life for his country.

=== Other honors ===
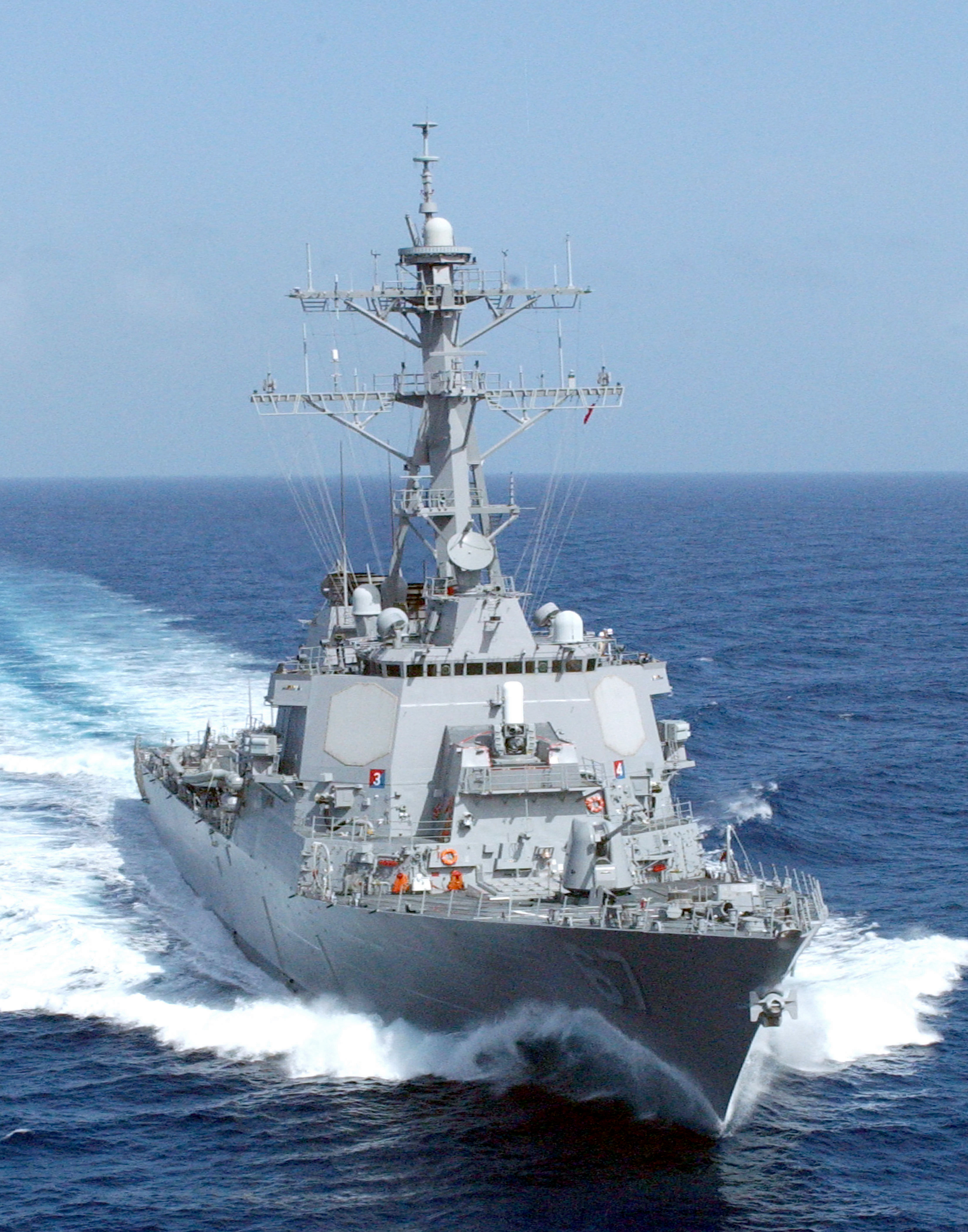
USS Cole (DDG-67)

The second USS Cole (DDG-67), an Arleigh Burke-class Aegis-equipped guided missile destroyer was named for Sergeant Cole. Cole is homeported in NS Norfolk, Virginia. The ship was built by Ingalls Shipbuilding and delivered to the Navy on March 11, 1996. On October 12, 2000, Cole was damaged by a suicide attack in an act of terrorism while harbored in the Yemeni port of Aden. The first USS Cole (DD-155), launched in 1919, was named for a Marine who was killed in World War I.

The Marine Corps Reserve training center in Camp Las Flores aboard Marine Corps base Camp Pendleton, California is also named in his honor.

The Sgt Darrell S. Cole Band Hall aboard Marine Corps Base Quantico is also named in his honor.

== See also ==
- Bombing of USS Cole
- List of Medal of Honor recipients
- List of Medal of Honor recipients for World War II
- List of Medal of Honor recipients for the Battle of Iwo Jima
