= List of terrorist incidents in 2000 =

This is a timeline of incidents in 2000 that have been labelled as "terrorism" and are not believed to have been carried out by a government or its forces (see state terrorism and state-sponsored terrorism).

== List guidelines ==
- To be included, entries must be notable (have a stand-alone article) and described by a consensus of reliable sources as "terrorism".
- List entries must comply with the guidelines outlined in the manual of style under MOS:TERRORIST.
- Casualty figures in this list are the total casualties of the incident, including immediate casualties and later casualties (such as people who succumbed to their wounds long after the attacks occurred).
- Casualties listed are the victims. Perpetrator casualties are listed separately (e.g. x (+y) indicate that x victims and y perpetrators were killed/injured).
- Casualty totals may be underestimated or unavailable due to a lack of information. A figure with a plus (+) sign indicates that at least that many people have died (e.g. 10+ indicates that at least 10 people have died) – the actual toll could be considerably higher. A figure with a plus (+) sign may also indicate that over that number of people are victims.
- If casualty figures are 20 or more, they will be shown in **bold**. In addition, figures for casualties more than 50 will also be **underlined**.
- Incidents are limited to one per location per day. If multiple attacks occur in the same place on the same day, they will be merged into a single incident.

== List ==
List of total incidents:17

Date	Type	Dead	Injured	Location	Details	Perpetrators	Part of
January 1	Shooting	21	40	Kosheh, Sohag Governorate, Egypt	Kosheh massacres: Coptic Christians killed by Muslims during 2 days of religiously motivated riots		
January 12	Shooting	3	4	Pretoria, Gauteng, South Africa	A right-wing extremist shot seven black South Africans aboard a bus, killing three.		
February 16–18		60-100+	Unknown	Villa del Rosario-El Salado, Bolívar Department, Colombia	El Salado Massacre: Autodefensas Unidas de Colombia militants kill more than 60 people. It´s considered the worst attack of the group.	Autodefensas Unidas de Colombia	Colombian armed conflict
April 12	mass shooting, grenade attack	11-15	20+	Mulawali, Pakistan	Armed attackers entered a Shia mosque during prayer time and opened fire as they threw grenades at worshippers. While security forces said that 11 people had been killed, local Shia leaders said that the death toll was 15.		
April 19	bombing	1	0	Quévert, Brittany, France	A bomb explodes at a McDonald's restaurant, killing a female employee. The bomb was planted by Breton nationalists.	Breton Liberation Front	
28 May	school massacre, shooting, machete attack	165-191	Unknown	Poso Regency, Indonesia	Walisongo school massacre: Hundreds of schoolchildren and villagers hiding inside a boarding school were massacred by Christian militias.	Christian militas	Poso riots
July 2		54 (+6)	100+	Chechnya, Russia	July 2000 Chechnya suicide bombings: Insurgents launched five suicide bomb attacks on the Russian military and police headquarters and barracks within 24 hours. Six bombers killed at least 37 Russian troops (with four more missing) and 11 civilians, and wounded more than 100 people		
1-2 August		89-105	62	Jammu and Kashmir, India	2000 Amarnath pilgrimage massacre: Hindu pilgrims were subjected to a series of repeated attacks by Islamist rebel militants.		Insurgency in Jammu and Kashmir
August 17		1	35	Riga, Latvia	2000 department store "Centrs" bombing: Two explosives placed at the shopping center Centrs detonated. The two blasts occurred in the lobby of the supermarket ten minutes apart. One person died of their injuries and 35 were wounded in the attack. Police were investigating, but had not yet arrested any suspects.	Unknown	
October 12		17 (+2)	39	Aden, Yemen	USS Cole bombing: Suicide attack against the U.S. Navy destroyer USS Cole (DDG-67) while it was docked. 17 American sailors and two attackers were killed.		
October 30	car bombing	3	64	Madrid, Spain	October 2000 Madrid bombing	ETA	Basque conflict
November 20	bombing	2	5	Kfar Darom, Gaza Strip	Kfar Darom school bus attack: Palestinian militants attacked a school bus near an Israeli settlement. Five children were wounded and two adults killed.		Second Intifada
November 22	car bombing	2	61	Hadera, Israel	2000 Hadera car bombing	Multiple Palestinian groups claimed responsibility	Second Intifada
November 24		4		Phnom Penh, Cambodia	2000 Cambodian coup d'état attempt	Cambodian Freedom Fighters	
December 8		22 (+1)	31	Jarafa, Sudan	2000 Jarafa mosque massacre: Shooting left at least 22 people dead.		
December 24	bombings	18	118	Indonesia	Christmas Eve 2000 Indonesia bombings	Jemaah Islamiyah	
December 30		22	100	Manila, Philippines	Rizal Day bombings: A wave of six blasts left a total of 22 people dead and about 100 injured. In May 2003, a detained terrorist Saifulla Unos who was involved in MILF and with links to al-Qa'ida admitted to leading the attacks. A fourth blast occurred at a cargo handling facility at Manila's international airport. No one was injured in this incident. On 2 August, two men were arrested and implicated in connection with these bombings. These men, Mamasao Naga and Abdul Pata have ties to the Jemaah Islamiah (JI) terrorist group.		

== See also ==
- List of terrorist incidents
- List of Palestinian suicide attacks
- List of Palestinian rocket attacks on Israel, 2001–2006
