= Iacopino =

Iacopino is an Italian surname. Notable people with the surname include:

- Vincent Iacopino, American doctor and author
- Vincenzo Iacopino (born 1976), Italian footballer
