= Kabir Mohabbat =

Afghan-American businessman

Kabir Mohabbat (October 10, 1956 - July 14, 2007) was an Afghan-American businessman born in Kabul, Afghanistan. He got his education from St. Louis, Missouri and then moved to Houston, Texas where he resided until his death in July 2007.

== Biography ==
=== Early life and education ===
Kabir Mohabbat was born in Kabul on October 10, 1956 into a prominent and politically active family. After graduating high school, his family sent him to the United States to obtain a university degree as well as to improve his skills in English.

=== Afghan War ===
In 1979, within days of receiving a B.A. in political science from Southeast Missouri State University, the Soviet Union invaded Afghanistan. Mohabbat immediately returned to Afghanistan and volunteered to fight. During the war, he had extensive involvement with various Afghan Mujahideen groups and supporting governments during their war with the Soviets. After the bombing of the USS Cole, he was asked by the U.S. to assist them in operations against the Taliban and Osama bin Laden.

=== Envoy ===
Kabir Mohabbat acted as a temporary envoy of the United States to the Taliban in the negotiations for the delivery of Osama bin Laden. It was his responsibility to facilitate talks and act as an intermediary between the two governments. He succeeded in the negotiations.

Toward the end of February 2001, the Taliban curbed all activities with bin Laden; they stripped him of his communications equipment and limited his contacts to those of his "immediate refugee life" in Afghanistan. When the Taliban placed bin Laden and some of his men under house arrest near Kandahar, the U.S was granted permission to arrest, capture or kill them on Afghan soil. The Afghan Government's representative even suggested that the U.S. hit bin Laden and his men with Cruise Missiles since the U.S. had fired them at Afghanistan once before.

Although invited, the U.S. did not act. Instead, Mohabbat was flown to Afghanistan time after time to apologize for the U.S. Government's inability to act. Toward the end of these missions, he asked U.S. authorities if the problem was the cost of fuel for the Cruise Missiles and he volunteered to pay for it. The last time Mohabbat was sent into Taliban territory at the behest of the U.S. Government was in August 2001.

=== Pakistan ===
On the day of 9/11, Mohabbat was in Pakistan. He was asked by the U.S. to help in the negotiation with the Afghan Government for the surrender of Osama bin Laden. The U.S. demanded that bin Laden be turned over within 24 hours. The Afghans argued that it was an impossible task as Osama bin Laden had an army on their soil protecting him. They asked for a week to capture bin Laden and his men but U.S. negotiators refused.

Several days later, when a representative of the Afghan Government called Mohabbat and expressed their consent to the U.S.'s demands, he immediately called U.S. authorities and explained that. The response from U.S. authorities was: "I will convey your message but I am afraid that the train has already left the station." To Kabir Mohabbat's sorrow, within days Afghanistan was bombed and the war began.

Sometime thereafter, Kabir Mohabbat was asked to become President of Afghanistan but he refused. He replied that in all conscience, he could not work solely for Afghanistan or the United States. He loved both countries and said, "I would be caught in the middle between two stubborn mules."

=== Negotiations ===
A history of Kabir Mohabbat's negotiations with the Taliban is documented in his biography Delivering Osama. Extensive original documents that support Kabir's life story are in his book.

=== Death ===
Kabir Mohabbat died of a coronary event in Houston in 2007.
