= Stephen Gill (lawyer) =

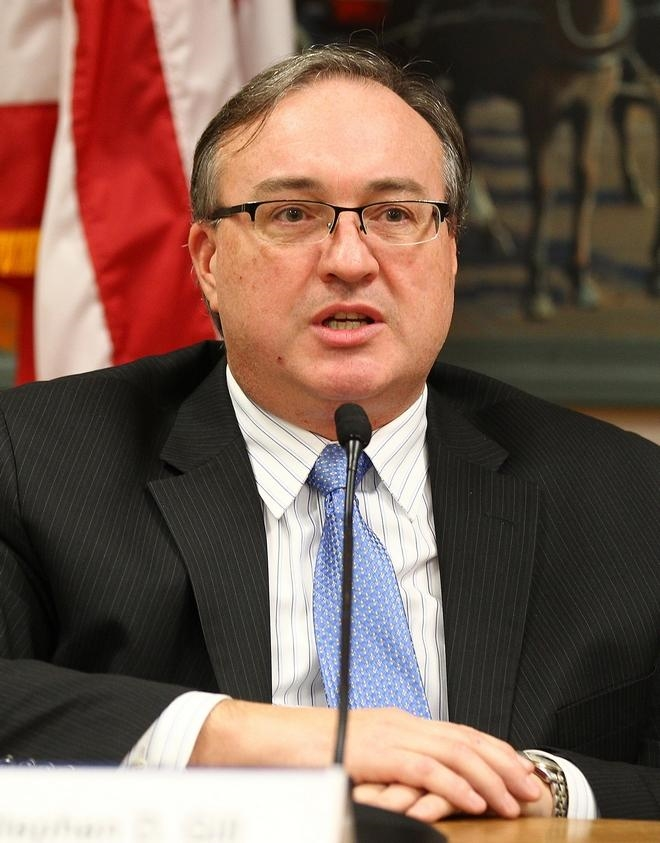
Stephen D. Gill (2018)

Stephen D. Gill is an American lawyer, from Massachusetts, and a retired United States Naval Reserve officer.

== Early life ==
Gill grew up in the Boston area, attended the University of Massachusetts at Amherst, Massachusetts, and earned his Juris Doctor degree at Loyola University College of Law in New Orleans.

== Navy career ==
In January 2015, Lt. Commander Stephen Gill, JAG Corps, U.S. Navy, was mobilized to serve on the staff of the Convening Authority, of the Guantanamo military commission. Convening Authority, retired U.S Marine Corps Major General Vaughn Ary tried to speed up the pace of the commissions by requiring the Presiding Officers to live on the base, full-time. Gill was part of the legal staff supporting the Guantanamo military commission. Within months of his arrival, Ary, and his legal staff, and several other civilian and military officers, but not Gill, were officially barred from working al-Nashiri's case, when it was judged Ary had been trying to exert unlawful command influence on the Presiding Officers judging certain cases, including that of Abd al Rahim al Nashiri.

Ary soon resigned from his position as Convening Authority, but his temporary replacement retired U.S. Navy Rear Admiral Lower Half Michael Quinn directed U.S. Army Colonel Edward Sheeran, and retired U.S. Army Colonel Mark Toole, Gill's superiors, to continue to work on al-Nashiri's case, in defiance of the order. According to the Courthouse News Service Gill "refused to participate in Toole and Sheeran's ongoing defiance of the disqualification order, reporting them three different times in March and April 2015."

After his third complaint up the chain-of-command, Gill was accused of misconduct. He was reassigned, to a different post, where he filed a fourth report of Sheeran and Toole's defiance of the court order. Within 24 hours of this fourth report Gill was demobilized.

Gill regarded his early and unscheduled demobilization as punitive, and a violation of the Military Whistleblower Protection Act, 10 U.S.C. § 1034.

In October 2016, Gill was served with a deposition subpoena by military commissions Chief Prosecutor, U.S. Army Brigadier General Mark S. Martins. In accordance with Rule 703(e)(2)(G) of the Rules of Military Commissions, Gill filed a request for relief from the military commission's deposition subpoena in October 2016, but after a secret, ex parte request made by Brigadier General Martins, military judge Vance Spath authorized United States Marshals to execute a writ of attachment to apprehend him and force him to continue his deposition testimony at a preliminary hearing of Abd al Rahim al Nashiri's Guantanamo military commission.

Although Rule 703(e)(2)(G) of the Rules of Military Commissions purports to authorize Judge Spath's actions, the rule isn't an "Act of Congress," and one expert has opined that Judge Spath's issuance of the writ of attachment against Gill was a clear violation of the "Non-Detention Act," 18 U.S.C. § 4001(a), which provides that "No citizen shall be imprisoned or otherwise detained by the United States except pursuant to an Act of Congress." However, in 2021, a federal judge found differently.

== Civilian career ==
Gill works as a lawyer in Massachusetts, and has served as Deputy Secretary for the Massachusetts Department of Veterans' Services and as a Special Assistant United States Attorney in the Northern District of Florida.

In 2016, Gill competed unsuccessfully for the Republican Party's nomination for the South Shore seat in the Massachusetts State Senate. Months before the Republican Primary, Gill announced he would run for the seat as an independent, but lost in the general election.
