= Kirk Lippold =

American naval commander (born 1959)

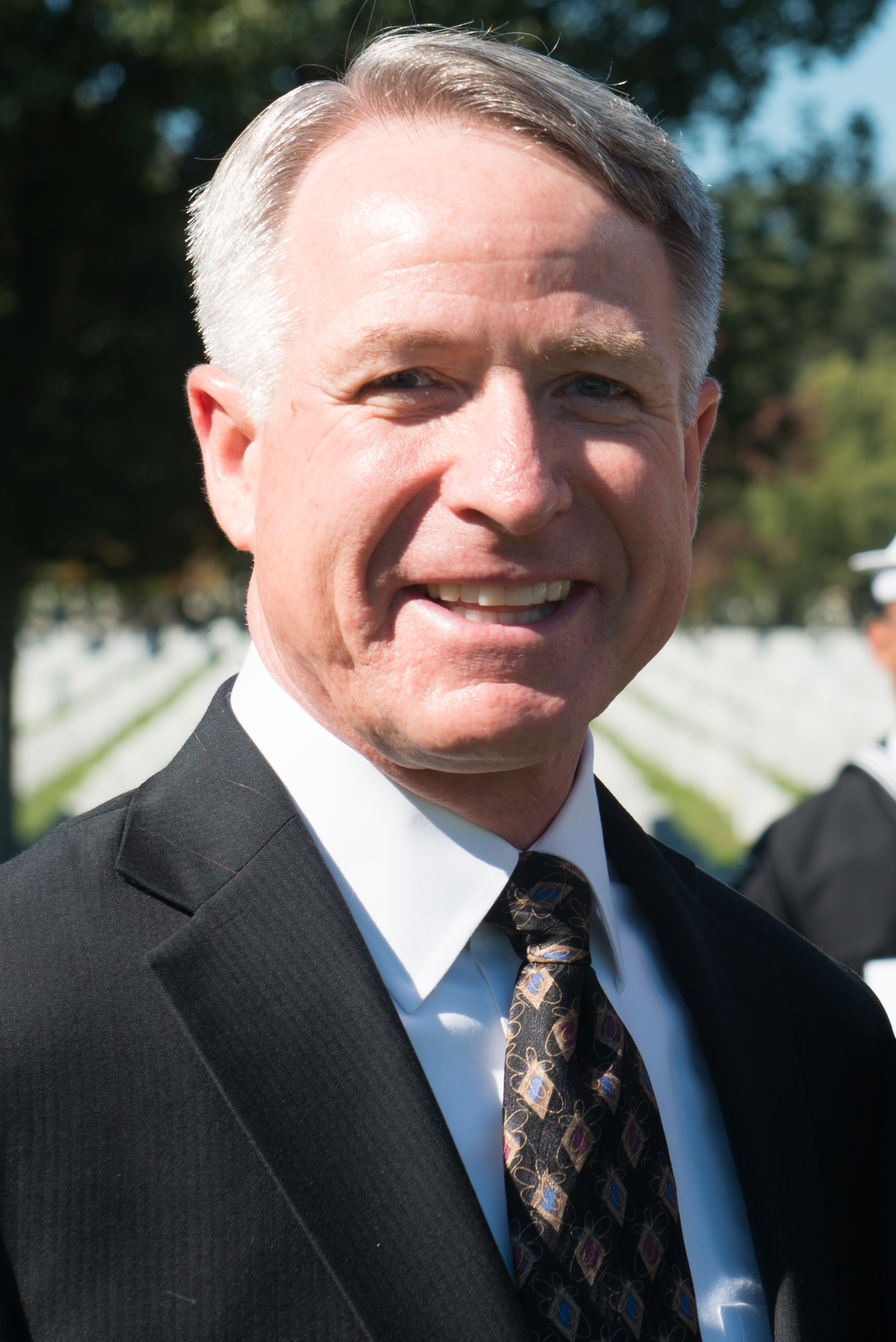
- Lippold in 2015
- Born: April 29, 1959 (age 67)
- Military career
- Allegiance: United States
- Branch: United States Navy
- Service years: 1981–2007
- Rank: Commander
- Commands: USS Cole
- Awards: Defense Superior Service Medal; Legion of Merit (three awards); Meritorious Service Medal (three awards); Combat Action Ribbon; Navy Commendation Medal (two awards); Joint Service Achievement Medal; Navy Achievement Medal (two awards)
- Other work: Adjunct Professor in the United States Naval Academy (2021–present); President of Lippold Strategies, LLC (2012–present); Vice President for Military Policy and Strategic Development of Phillip Stutts & Company, Inc. (2012–2015); Motivation Speaker for the Keppler Speakers Bureau (2007–present)

Kirk S. Lippold (born April 29, 1959) is a former U.S. Navy officer. He was the commanding officer of the United States Navy destroyer USS Cole on October 12, 2000, when the ship was attacked and bombed by al-Qaeda terrorists during a refueling stop in the Yemeni port of Aden, killing 17 U.S. sailors. Lippold assumed command of Cole on June 25, 1999, and served until he was relieved on March 9, 2001.

== Education ==
Lippold is a 1981 graduate of the United States Naval Academy. He received a Masters of Science in Systems Engineering (Joint Command, Control and Communications) from the U.S. Naval Postgraduate School, which he attended from 1987 to 1989. He graduated from United States Army Command and General Staff College in 1994 and from Joint Forces Staff College in 2001.

== Military ==
Before serving as commanding officer of USS Cole from 1999 to 2001, Lippold was executive officer on the cruiser USS Shiloh. He also served as the operations officer on the commissioning crew of the destroyer USS Arleigh Burke, the lead ship of the same destroyer class as Cole. He was division officer aboard the cruiser USS Yorktown and the tank landing ship USS Fairfax County. Following his departure from Cole, he received a series of desk positions at the Pentagon. Working in the War on Terrorism Division of the Joint Chiefs of Staff, Directorate for Strategic Plans and Policy, Lippold "was instrumental" in the creation of detainee policy in the immediate aftermath of the 9/11 attacks.

A Navy promotion board had selected Lippold for promotion to captain (O-6) in 2002 but he was not confirmed by the United States Senate, this despite a 2001 Navy investigation that concluded that Lippold and his crew probably could not have prevented the attack and should not be punished (although investigators found that had Lippold followed twelve safety procedures, among several dozen which were not observed per the existing security requirements in Aden, the attack could have been mitigated or prevented). Subsequent Navy promotion boards continued to select Lippold for captain, and in all cases the selection was subsequently struck down by the Senate. On August 22, 2006, the Associated Press reported that Secretary of the Navy Donald C. Winter removed Lippold from the promotion list. Secretary of the Navy Winter concluded after reviewing the matter that Lippold's actions before the attack on October 12, 2000, "...did not meet the high standard..." expected of the Navy's commanding officers. Based on that assessment, Winter determined that Lippold was "...not the best and fully qualified for promotion to the higher grade..." of Captain and struck him from being further eligible for promotion.

Lippold's final U.S. Navy assignment was to the Office of the Chief of Naval Operations in the International Strategy Division. He retired as a commander in May 2007 at the age of 48 during a ceremony at the United States Navy Memorial in Washington, D.C.

== Civilian career ==
Lippold is a senior military fellow with Military Families United, an advocacy group opposed to the release of prisoners held at Guantanamo Bay Naval Base.

On June 22, 2009, The Washington Times published an op-ed by Lippold that was critical of the Barack Obama administration, for not showing enough sympathy to American victims of terror. Lippold asserted that the families of the victims of terror should play a role in deciding which terror suspects should be tried, and in which kind of court they should be tried.

On February 4, 2010, the Las Vegas Review-Journal reported that Lippold was considering a run for U.S. Senate in Nevada against Harry Reid. He did not enter the race. Instead, he ran for the Republican nomination in the 2011 Nevada 2nd congressional district special election. He lost to Mark Amodei and declined to run as an Independent.

On December 12, 2012, Phillip Stutts & Company Inc., a political marketing organization, announced that Lippold was joining the firm as Senior Vice President for Military Policy and Strategic Development.

On October 12, 2015, the fifteenth anniversary of the bombing of USS Cole, Lippold appeared on Your World Cavuto and repeated his call from 2009 for justice for the Cole victims.
