= Michel Paradis =

American human rights attorney, Professor, Author

- Citizenship: American
- Education: Oxford (DPhil) Fordham (JD/BA)
- Occupations: Human Rights Lawyer, Historian, Professor

Michel Paradis is an American human rights attorney, law professor, and author. He has written several books, most notably The Light of Battle, a biography of Dwight Eisenhower, and Last Mission to Tokyo, about the war crimes trials following the Doolittle Raid during World War II.

== Early life and education ==
In 2004, Paradis received his Juris Doctor from Fordham University in New York. In 2011, he received his Doctor of Philosophy in computational linguistics from Oxford University, where he did foundational research on large language models and Mixture of Experts techniques. While at Oxford, he was also an editor of the Oxonian Review.

== Legal career ==
Paradis has worked as a human rights lawyer on conflicts arising around the world and the human rights implications of emerging technology.

In 2007, Paradis joined the Department of Defense as an attorney, where he worked on the cases of the Guantanamo detainees. In 2014, Paradis won the Ali al-Bahlul case in the United States Court of Appeals for the District of Columbia Circuit, which established the applicability of the ex post facto clause in Guantanamo. In 2019, Paradis won the case of In re Al-Nashiri, which invalidated five years of proceedings against Abd al-Rahim al-Nashiri on the ground that the military judge had committed misconduct. Paradis was featured in the Netflix documentary Turning Point: 9/11 and the War on Terror where he was critical of the human rights consequences of the war on terror.

In 2025, Paradis was elected as a Partner at Steptoe, where he specializes in National Security law and Artificial intelligence. He is a Lecturer at Columbia Law School in New York, where he teaches artificial intelligence and national security law. He is also a Contributing Editor at Lawfare.

== Books ==
- Counter-Terrorism: International Law and Practice (2012)
- Last Mission to Tokyo: The Doolittle Raiders and their Final Fight for Justice (2020)
- Reimagining the National Security State: Liberalism on the Brink (2019)
- The Light of Battle: Eisenhower, D-Day and the Birth of the American Superpower (2024)

== Awards and recognition ==
- 2020 - U.S. Department of Defense, Secretary of Defense Global War on Terrorism Medal.
