= Vincent Iacopino =

American doctor

- Occupation: medical doctor
- Known for: an expert on recognizing and treating the after-effects of torture

Vincent Iacopino is an American doctor, who has specialized in the after-effects of torture. He is the author or co-author of several books on torture, or that address topics related to torture. He came up with the idea of the Istanbul Protocol.

In 2001 Iacopino wrote a manual on recognizing and treating torture victims for the United Nations.

Iacopino published a paper entitled "Neglect of Medical Evidence of Torture in Guantánamo Bay: A Case Series" in April 2011.

On February 5, 2013, Iacopino testified, by video link, at the Guantanamo Military Commission in the case of Abd al Rahim al Nashiri who is accused of involvement in the USS Cole bombing. Iacopino was asked on how to conduct a no-harm medical examination on Nashiri who was subject of what is described as a mock execution and who was waterboarded by the CIA twice. On February 7, in response to a Prosecution request James Pohl, the Presiding Officer of al Nashiri's Military Commission ordered that a panel of mental health experts examine Al Nashiri. The Defense, in turn, argued that panel should take advice from Iacopino, on how to interview Al Nashiri without causing additional damage.

On March 28, 2016, Spencer Ackerman, writing in The Guardian, broke an account of how, although the CIA had illegally destroyed its extensive library of video tapes documenting the torture of the men and boys it had apprehended through its covert "snatch teams", it still retained humiliating naked photos of bruised and beaten captives that observers described as "gruesome". Iacopino was widely cited as an expert on torture who stated that humiliating captives by taking photos of them, while naked, was a form of sexual humiliation which could be considered a form of torture. According to Camila Vargax of Latercera, Iacopino called for an investigation, from international authorities, to determine whether the photos were a war crime.
