= Mark S. Martins =

United States Army general

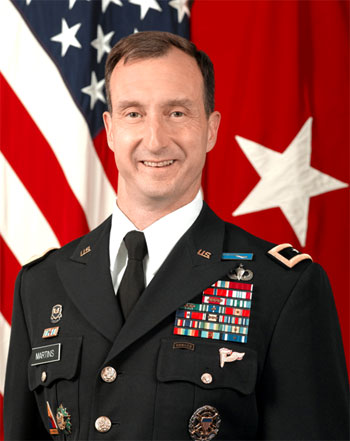
- BG Mark S. Martins
- Born: July 26, 1960 (age 65); New York, U.S.
- Allegiance: United States
- Branch: United States Army
- Service years: 1983–2021
- Rank: Brigadier General
- Awards: Defense Superior Service Medal; Legion of Merit; Bronze Star Medal (2)

Mark Steven Martins (born July 26, 1960) is a retired United States Army officer. He attained the rank of brigadier general in the United States Army Judge Advocate General's Corps. Martin's final position was Chief Prosecutor of Military Commissions, overseeing the trial of Khalid Sheik Mohammed and four co-defendants.

== Early life ==
Martins attended high school in Rockville, Maryland. His father was a colonel in the US Army as well as the chief of neurosurgery at the Walter Reed Army Medical Center.

== Education ==
Martins attended the University of Maryland for one year before being admitted to the United States Military Academy at West Point.

He received his Bachelor of Science (BS) from the United States Military Academy at West Point in 1983, graduating first in his class of 833 students. After graduation, Martins attended Army Ranger School. He was then awarded a Rhodes Scholarship and attended Balliol College at the University of Oxford, graduating with a Master of Arts (MA) in 1985 with first class honors.

He also holds a Juris Doctor (JD) from Harvard Law School where he served on the Harvard Law Review with Barack Obama and graduated magna cum laude, a Master of Laws (LLM) in Military Law from The Judge Advocate General's Legal Center and School in Charlottesville, Virginia (graduating first in his class), and a Master of Military Arts and Sciences (MMAS) from the Command and General Staff College (graduating first in his class).

== Military career ==
Martins commissioned into the Infantry Branch of the US Army and served as a platoon leader in the 82nd Airborne Division in 1983. In 1987, he was accepted into the Army's Funded Legal Education Program (FLEP). Upon his graduation from Harvard Law School in 1990, Martins became a judge advocate in the United States Army Judge Advocate General's Corps.

His military education includes:

- Infantry Officer Basic Course
- Judge Advocate Officer Basic Course
- Judge Advocate Officer Graduate Course
- Combined Arms and Services Staff School
- Command and General Staff College
- National War College

Since becoming a judge advocate, Martins has held a number of positions. This includes Trial Counsel, Chief of Legal Assistance, Chief of Administrative Law, Operational Law Attorney, and Senior Trial Counsel for the 101st Airborne Division. Martins was also the Instructor of International and Operational Law and deputy director of the Center for Law and Military Operations.

Additionally, Martins served overseas as the Deputy Staff Judge Advocate for the 1st Infantry Division while stationed in Germany. he was also the Chief of Staff of USKFOR and the Legal Advisor to Commanding General, Task Force Falcon while stationed in Kosovo. Furthermore, he was also the Deputy Legal Counsel to the Chairman of the Joint Chiefs of Staff.

From 2006 to 2008, Martins led the Rule of Law campaign for Multi-National Force - Iraq. While in Iraq, Martins coordinated the work of United States and coalition investigative, corrections, and judicial experts and directed MNF-I support to Iraq's courts and law enforcement institutions. He is reportedly a close friend of General David Petraeus, and the two frequently went running together in Iraq.

In September 2009 he was appointed the Deputy Commanding General of Joint Task Force 435, charged with reforming military detention operations in Afghanistan. During this time, he also co-led the interagency Detention Policy Task Force. By February 2010 he was overseeing detainee operations at the Detention Facility in Parwan (DFIP) which replaced the Bagram Theater Internment Facility.

In the fall of 2010, Martins assumed command of the new Rule of Law Field Force - Afghanistan, which works to transform problem areas into secure and accountable legal environments.

In a lecture following his acceptance of Harvard Law School's Medal of Freedom in 2011, Martins said:

[Afghanistan's] lack of governance … is accompanied by a lack of confidence in the government's ability to deliver justice, resolve civil disputes and address a perceived culture of impunity among the powerful. Establishing the rule of law in these districts is critical to the kind of sound governance that will enable an enduring transition of security responsibility to Afghan forces and deny that rugged country as a sanctuary for global threats.

Martins became the Chief Prosecutor of Military Commissions in 2011 at Guantánamo Bay Detention Camp. During this time, he reportedly requested not to be considered for a promotion as Martins was in-line for a promotion to major general, though he felt that a promotion would be disruptive to his work in Guantánamo.

In 2013, the army extended Martin's retirement beyond the scheduled late 2014 date, then to 2019, and finally to 2023. In 2021, he decided to retire effective September 30, 2021, before the start of the 9/11 trials. Martins' retirement announcement came as a surprise to many, though Martins was actually due to retire many times before 2021.

== Military awards ==
Martins is a recipient of the Defense Superior Service Medal, the Legion of Merit, the Bronze Star (two awards), and the Meritorious Service Medal (multiple awards).

His badges include the Ranger Tab, the Expert Infantryman Badge, the Senior Parachutist Badge, the Pathfinder Badge, and the Air Assault Badge.

== Personal life ==
Martins is married. His wife Kate is also a West Point graduate, and was a helicopter pilot in the US Army. They have two children. Martins' son Nate also attended West Point and completed Ranger School in the US Army. His daughter, Hannah, was in Army ROTC at Princeton University.
