= USS Cole (DDG-67) =

Arleigh Burke-class destroyer

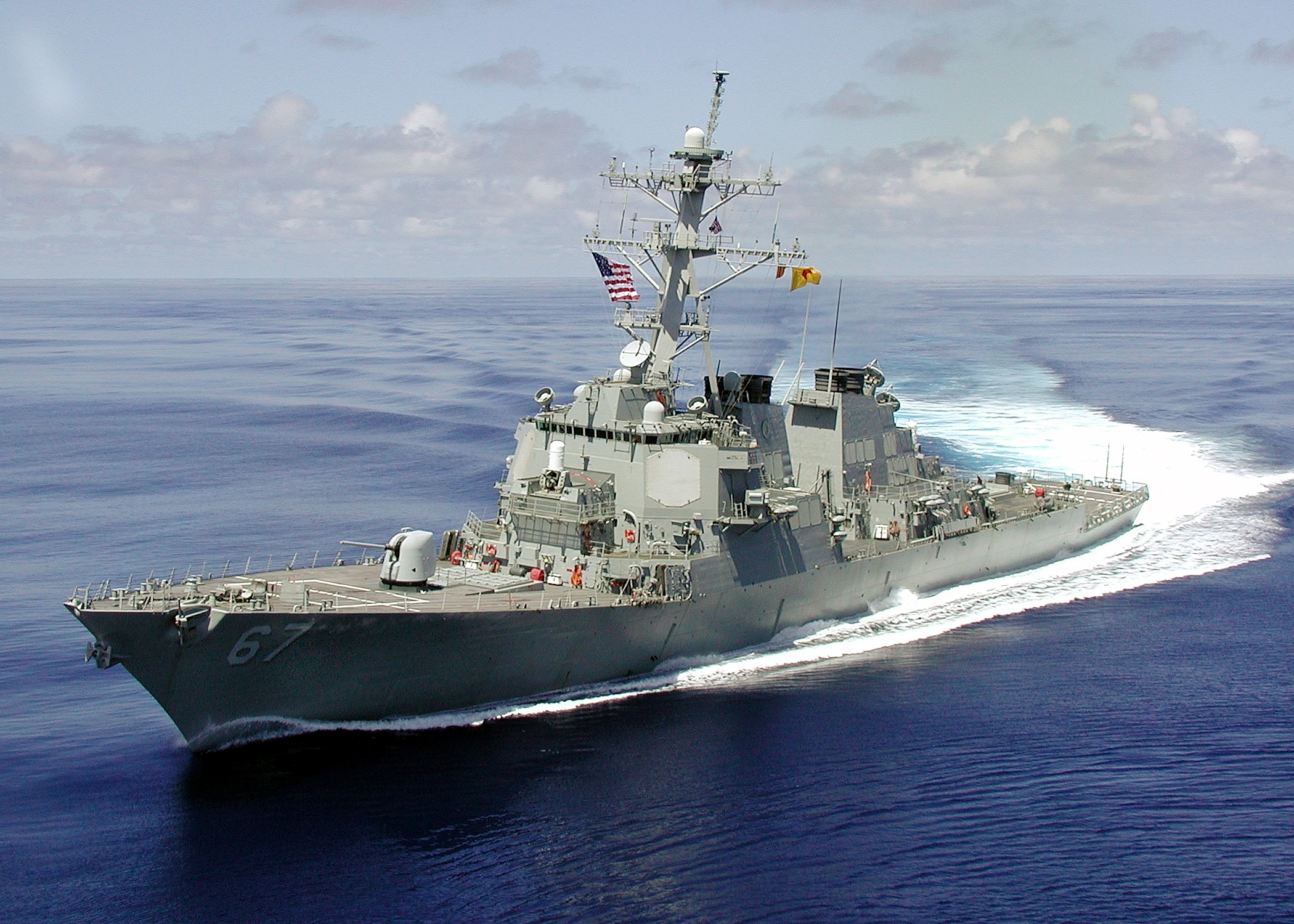
- USS Cole on 14 September 2000

History

United States
- Name: Cole
- Namesake: Darrell S. Cole
- Ordered: 16 January 1991
- Builder: Ingalls Shipbuilding
- Laid down: 28 February 1994
- Launched: 10 February 1995
- Commissioned: 8 June 1996
- Home port: Norfolk
- Identification: MMSI number: 8590639; Callsign: NDDG; Hull number: DDG-67
- Motto: Gloria Merces Virtutis; (Glory is the Reward of Valor)
- Nickname(s): Determined Warrior
- Honors and awards: See Awards
- Status: in active service
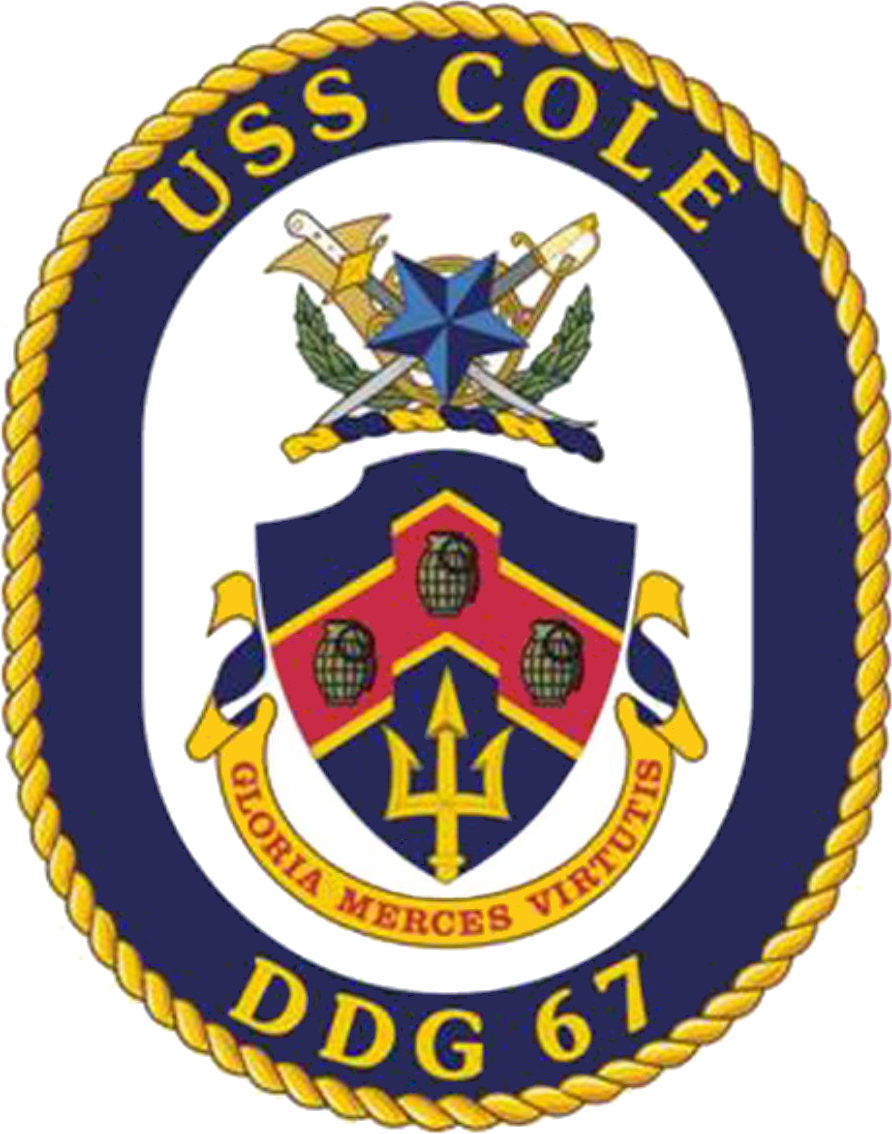
- Badge

General characteristics
- Class & type: Arleigh Burke-class destroyer
- Displacement: Light: approx. 6,800 long tons (6,900 t); Full: approx. 8,900 long tons (9,000 t)
- Length: 505 ft (154 m)
- Beam: 59 ft (18 m)
- Draft: 31 ft (9.4 m)
- Propulsion: 2 × shafts
- Speed: In excess of 30 kn (56 km/h; 35 mph)
- Range: 4,400 nmi (8,100 km; 5,100 mi) at 20 kn (37 km/h; 23 mph)
- Complement: Arleigh Burke-class destroyer complement
- Sensors & processing systems: AN/SPY-1D PESA 3D radar (Flight I, II, IIA); AN/SPY-6(V)1 AESA 3D radar (Flight III); AN/SPS-67(V)3 or (V)5 surface search radar (DDG-51 – DDG-118); AN/SPQ-9B surface search radar (DDG-119 onward); AN/SPS-73(V)12 surface search/navigation radar (DDG-51 – DDG-86); BridgeMaster E surface search/navigation radar (DDG-87 onward); 3 × AN/SPG-62 fire-control radar; Mk 46 optical sight system (Flight I, II, IIA); Mk 20 electro-optical sight system (Flight III); AN/SQQ-89 ASW combat system: AN/SQS-53C sonar array; AN/SQR-19 tactical towed array sonar (Flight I, II, IIA); TB-37U multi-function towed array sonar (DDG-113 onward); AN/SQQ-28 LAMPS III shipboard system
- Electronic warfare & decoys: AN/SLQ-32 electronic warfare suite; AN/SLQ-25 Nixie torpedo countermeasures; Mk 36 Mod 12 decoy launching systems; Mk 53 Nulka decoy launching systems; Mk 59 decoy launching systems
- Armament: Guns: 1 × 5-inch (127 mm)/54 mk 45 mod 1/2 (lightweight gun); 2 × 20 mm (0.8 in) Phalanx CIWS; 2 × 25 mm (0.98 in) Mk 38 machine gun system; 4 × 0.50 inches (12.7 mm) caliber guns; Missiles: 2 × Mk 141 Harpoon anti-ship missile launcher; 1 × 29-cell, 1 × 61-cell (90 total cells) Mk 41 vertical launching system (VLS): RIM-66M surface-to-air missile; RIM-156 surface-to-air missile; BGM-109 Tomahawk cruise missile; RUM-139 vertical launch ASROC; Torpedoes: 2 × Mark 32 triple torpedo tubes: Mark 46 lightweight torpedo; Mark 50 lightweight torpedo; Mark 54 lightweight torpedo
- Aircraft carried: 1 × Sikorsky MH-60R

USS Cole (DDG-67) is an Arleigh Burke-class (Flight I) Aegis guided missile destroyer home-ported in Naval Station Norfolk, Virginia. Cole is named in honor of Marine Sergeant Darrell S. Cole, a machine-gunner killed in action on Iwo Jima on 19 February 1945, during World War II. Cole is one of 62 authorized Arleigh Burke-class guided missile destroyers, and one of 21 members of the Flight I-class that used the 5 in(127 mm)/54 caliber gun mounts found on the earliest of the Arleigh Burke-class destroyers. The ship was built by Ingalls Shipbuilding and was delivered to the Navy on 11 March 1996.

On 12 October 2000, Cole was bombed in a suicide attack carried out by the militant organization al-Qaeda in the Yemeni port of Aden, killing 17 sailors, injuring 39 others, and damaging the ship. On 29 November 2003, Cole engaged in her first overseas deployment after the bombing and subsequently returned to her home port of Norfolk, Virginia, on 27 May 2004 without incident.

== Service history ==
Cole was launched on 10 February 1995 and commissioned on 8 June 1996 in Port Everglades, Florida. Cole was in continual service for the United States Navy for several years after being commissioned, but an al-Qaeda terrorist attack in 2000, allegedly plotted by Khalid Sheikh Mohammed, heavily damaged the ship, requiring extensive repairs, although still capable of eventually returning to service.

Cole spent the first seven months of 2000 completing the intermediate and advanced portions of the Inter-Deployment Training Cycle. From 7 March to 7 April, Cole participated in Composite Training Unit Exercise (COMPTUEX) 00-2 as part of Cruiser-Destroyer Group 2, led by the aircraft carrier George Washington, operating within the Gulf of Mexico operating areas. Cole was the only unit not 'damaged' during the exercise. From 9 to 22 May, Cole participated in Joint Task Force Exercise 00-2 with the battle group, operating within the Cherry Point and Virginia Capes operating areas. On 8 August 2000, Cole departed on deployment, spending much time in the Mediterranean and Adriatic.

=== Al-Qaeda attack ===
On 12 October 2000, while at anchor in Aden for refueling, Cole was attacked by Al-Qaeda suicide bombers, who sailed a small boat near the destroyer and detonated explosive charges. The blast created a hole in the port side of the ship about 40 feet (12 m) in diameter, killing 17 crew members and injuring 37. The ship was under the command of Commander Kirk Lippold.

Eleven seriously injured sailors—two women and nine men—were evacuated to various hospitals in Aden by French Air Force Transall C-160 airplanes from the French Forces of Djibouti. French forces were mobilized to treat the wounded. Afterward, a USAF McDonnell Douglas C-9 evacuated them.

Cole was returned to the United States aboard the Norwegian heavy-lift ship MV Blue Marlin, then owned by Offshore Heavy Transport of Norway. The ship was off-loaded 13 December 2000 from Blue Marlin in a dredged deep-water facility at the Pascagoula, Mississippi, shipyard of Northrop Grumman Ship Systems, Ingalls Operations. On 14 January 2001, Cole was moved from the floating dry dock at Litton Ingalls Shipbuilding to the land facility to begin her restoration process fully. Cole's movement over land was accomplished by a system of electrically powered cars that traveled on rails. Cole was moved to a construction bay near where the ship was originally built five years before. On 1 July 2001, still under repair, she was transferred to Carrier Group 2, led by the aircraft carrier Harry S. Truman.

On 14 September 2001, Cole was moved from drydock into the water once again. Initially scheduled for 15 September, the transfer was done the night of 14 September secretly to avoid the large media event originally scheduled one month before the September 11 attacks. Moving the ship from the dry dock to the water took around eight hours. As part of the increased security surrounding the undocking, sister ship USS Bulkeley provided weapons and a physical presence to deter the possibility of any militant activity during the move. After 14 months of repair, Cole departed on 19 April 2002, and returned to her home port of Norfolk, Virginia.

On 3 December 2001, Cole transitioned from Destroyer Squadron 22, to COMDESRON 18 and the Enterprise Battle Group. The move to CDS 18 was followed by a visit to Cole by Commodore Daniel Holloway, Commander, Destroyer Squadron 18, on 10–11 December 2001.

The U.S. government offered a reward of up to $5 million for information leading to the arrest of people who committed or aided in the attack on Cole. Al-Qaeda was suspected of targeting Cole following the failure of a 3 January 2000 attack on the destroyer The Sullivans, one of the 2000 millennium attack plots.

On 4 November 2002, Qaed Salim Sinan al-Harethi, a suspected al-Qaeda operative who is believed to have planned the Cole attack, was killed in Yemen by the Central Intelligence Agency using an AGM-114 Hellfire missile launched from a General Atomics MQ-1 Predator drone.

In April 2019, a federal court dismissed two years of rulings in pretrial proceedings by the judge overseeing the military trial of Abd al-Rahim al-Nashiri, the alleged leader of the 2000 bombing of Cole, at Guantánamo Bay; the case was expected to drag on for years.

On 13 February 2020, the government of Sudan agreed to compensate the families of the sailors who died in the bombing.

=== Redeployment ===
On 20 August 2003, Cole got underway with the Argentine destroyer Sarandí for a short group sail. Embarked onboard Cole was the Visit, Board, Search, and Seizure (VBSS) Team from the destroyer Thorn. Together with Cole's two VBSS teams, they conducted a series of Maritime Interdiction Operation (MIO) boardings on both Cole and Sarandí to practice for the upcoming Composite Training Unit Exercise (COMPTUEX). On 21 August, Cole fired CIWS and 5-inch rounds during a Killer Tomato Exercise in addition to conducting a series of personnel transfers with Sarandí via Sarandí's helicopter. Three of each ship's officers spent a few hours on their counterpart. The destroyer Gonzalez joined the group to conduct their own MIO boardings. On 22 August, all three ships conducted an underway replenishment with the supply vessel John Lenthall before heading back to Norfolk.

The predeployment COMPTUEX tested Cole's crew and all of the Enterprise Strike Group from 10 September 2003 until the beginning of October, starting with a series of structured events. On the first day, Cole's CIC teams participated in a jamming exercise, demonstrating the effects on Cole's sensors while being jammed.

On 29 November 2003 Cole deployed for her first overseas deployment after the bombing. December began with Cole in company with fellow destroyers Gonzalez and Thorn, transiting the Atlantic Ocean for the deployment of Cruiser-Destroyer Group 12, the Enterprise strike group. On 1 December, all three ships conducted an underway replenishment with the supply vessel Arctic, the Surface Strike Group's last fuel stop until reaching Europe. She subsequently returned to her home port of Norfolk on 27 May 2004, without incident.

In 2005 Cole participated in Exercise BALTOPS 05 in the Baltic Sea. Cole returned to the U.S. in early July and attended Fourth of July celebrations in Philadelphia.

Cole deployed to the Middle East on 8 June 2006, for the first time since the bombing. While passing the port city of Aden, the ship's company manned the rail to honor the crewmembers killed in the bombing. She returned to her home port of Norfolk on 6 December 2006, again without incident.

On 21 August 2006, the Associated Press reported that Cole's commanding officer at the time of the bombing, Commander Kirk Lippold, had been denied promotion to the rank of captain.

On 28 February 2008, Cole was sent to take station off Lebanon's coast, the first of an anticipated three-ship flotilla.

On 3 February 2017, a U.S. defense official told Fox News, "The Navy sent USS Cole to the Gulf of Aden following an attack earlier this week [30 January] on a Saudi warship off Yemen by Iranian-backed Houthi rebels". Both Iran and the Houthis have denied they are collaborating with each other.

In May 2022, Cole was homeported out of Naval Station Norfolk and a part of Destroyer Squadron 28, along with Carrier Strike Group 8 led by the USS Harry S. Truman.

Cole's latest deployment began in May 2024. In response to escalating tensions in the Middle East following the October 7, 2023, Hamas attack on Israel, Cole, along with USS Laboon and several strike force vessels have been cruising areas from the Persian Gulf to the Mediterranean Sea.

On 1 October 2024, Cole was involved in the interception of missiles employing SM-3 and SM-6 missiles during the October 2024 Iranian strikes on Israel.

=== Awards ===
- Combat Action Ribbon - (12 October 2000, USS Cole bombing, August 2024, Operation Prosperity Guardian)
- Navy Unit Commendation - (Oct 1997 - Apr 1998, 12 Oct 2000)
- Navy Meritorious Unit Commendation - (Jan-Aug 2017) GEORGE H W BUSH STRIKE GROUP
- Navy E Ribbon - (1997, 1998, 2008, 2015, 2017, 2018, 2021, 2022, 2023)
- Navy Expeditionary Medal - (Jan-Dec 1998, Oct 2000-Dec 2002)
- Captain Edward F. Ney Memorial Award for outstanding food service - (2009)

== Upgrade ==
On 12 November 2009, the Missile Defense Agency announced that Cole would be upgraded during fiscal year 2013 to RIM-161 Standard Missile 3 capability to function as part of the Aegis Ballistic Missile Defense System.

== See also ==
- USS Samuel B. Roberts (FFG-58)
- USS Stark (FFG-31)
