= USS Cole bombing =

2000 suicide attack by al-Qaeda

- Part of the Al-Qaeda insurgency in Yemen
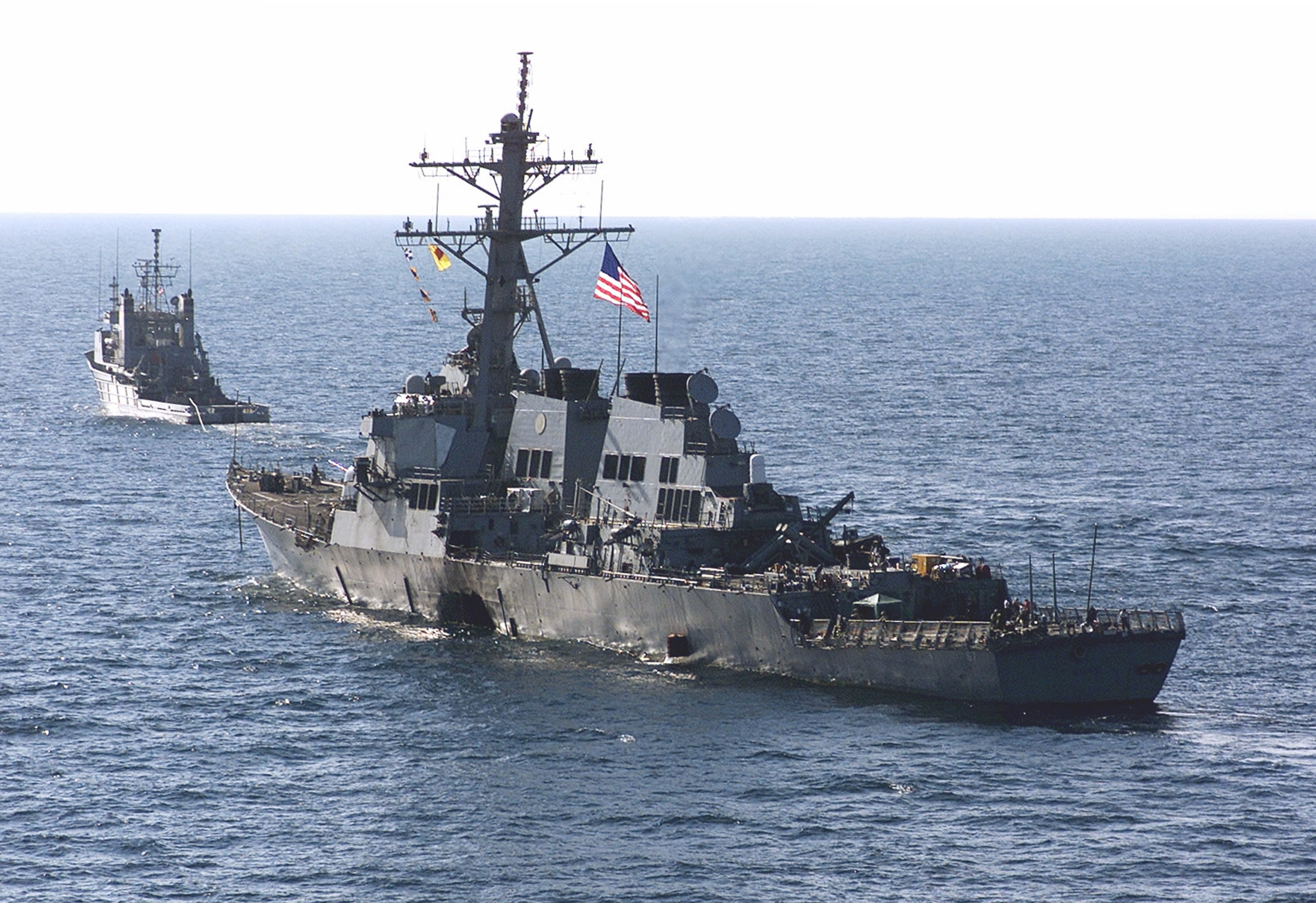
- The Military Sealift Command fleet ocean tug USNS Catawba towing USS Cole after the bombing.
- Location: 12.8022°N 45.0054°E; Aden, Yemen
- Date: 12 October 2000; 26 years ago 11:18 am (UTC +03:00)
- Target: USS Cole
- Attack type: Suicide attack
- Deaths: 19 (including 2 attackers)
- Injuries: 37
- Perpetrator: al-Qaeda

The USS Cole bombing was a suicide attack by al-Qaeda against USS Cole, a guided missile destroyer of the United States Navy, on 12 October 2000, while she was being refueled in Yemen's Aden harbor.

Seventeen U.S. Navy sailors were killed and thirty-seven injured in the deadliest attack against a United States naval vessel since the USS Stark incident in 1987.

Al-Qaeda claimed responsibility for the attack. A U.S. judge held Sudan liable for the attack, while another released over $13 million in Sudanese frozen assets to the relatives of those killed. The U.S. Navy reconsidered its rules of engagement in response to this attack. On 30 October 2020, Sudan and the United States signed a bilateral claims agreement to compensate families of the sailors who died in the bombing. The agreement entered into force in February 2021.

== Attack ==
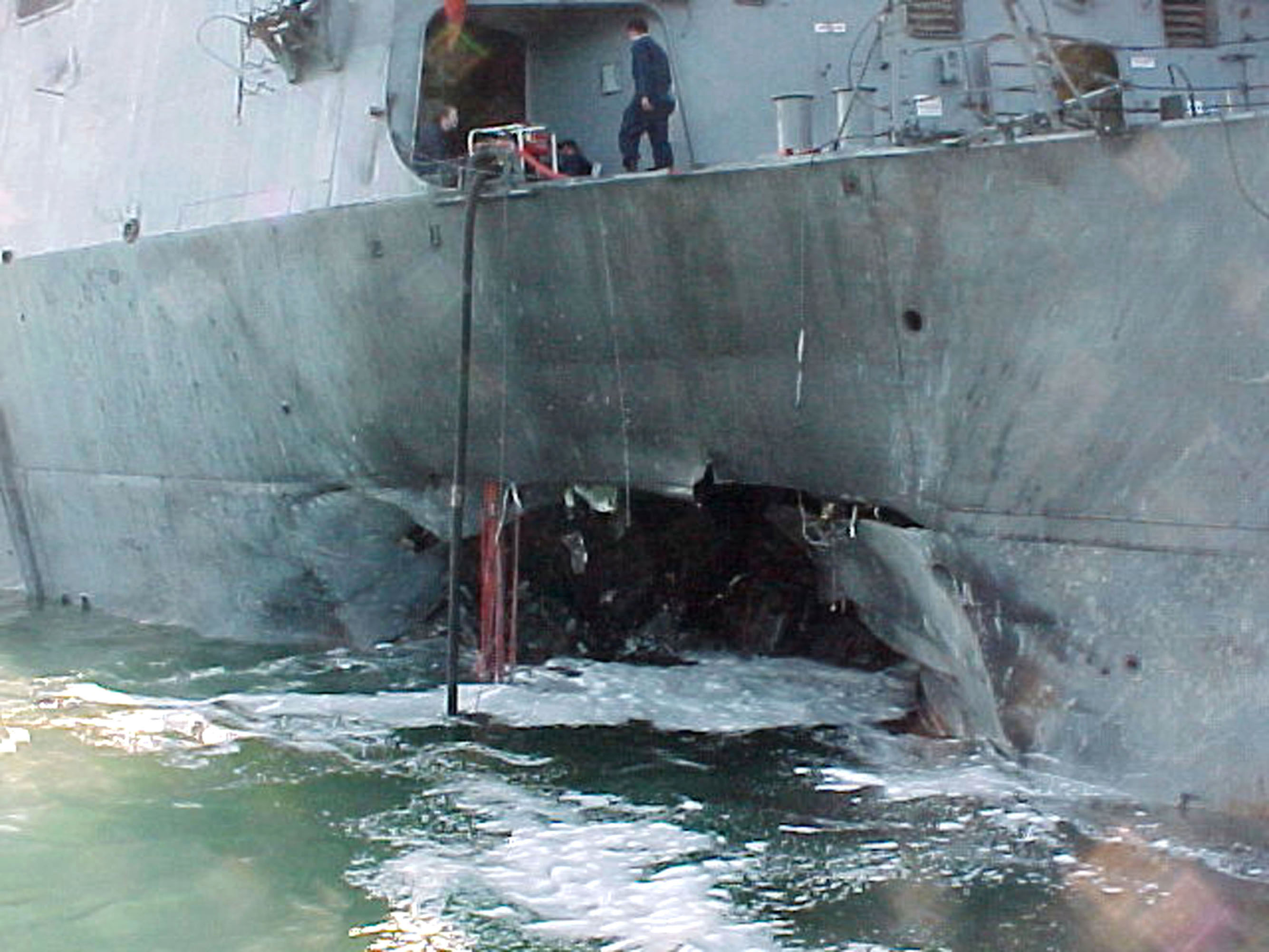
USS Cole after the attack

On the morning of Thursday, 12 October 2000, Cole, under the command of Commander Kirk Lippold, docked in Aden harbor for a routine fuel stop. Cole completed mooring at 9:30 and began refueling at 10:30. Around 11:18 local time (08:18 UTC), a small fiberglass boat carrying C4 explosives and two suicide bombers approached the port side of the destroyer and exploded, creating a 40-by-60-foot (12 by 18 m) gash in the ship's port side. Former CIA intelligence officer Robert Finke said the blast appeared to be caused by C4 explosives molded into a shaped charge against the hull of the boat. More than 1,000 pounds (450 kg) of explosive were used. Much of the blast entered a mechanical space below the ship's galley, violently pushing up the deck, thereby killing crew members who were lining up for lunch. The crew fought flooding in the engineering spaces and had the damage under control after three days. Divers inspected the hull and determined that the keel had not been damaged.

The attack was the deadliest against a U.S. naval vessel since an Iraqi aircraft's attack on USS Stark on 17 May 1987. The asymmetric warfare attack was organized and directed by the terrorist organization al-Qaeda. In June 2001, an al-Qaeda recruitment video featuring Osama bin Laden boasted about the attack and encouraged similar attacks.

Al-Qaeda had previously attempted a similar attack on the U.S. Navy destroyer USS The Sullivans while she was in port at Aden on 3 January 2000, as a part of the 2000 millennium attack plots. The plan was to load a boat full of explosives and detonate them near The Sullivans. However, the boat was so overladen that it sank, forcing the attack to be abandoned.

Planning for the October attack was discussed at the Kuala Lumpur al-Qaeda summit from 5 to 8 January, shortly after the failed attempt. Along with other plotters, the summit was attended by future September 11 hijacker Khalid al-Mihdhar, who then traveled to San Diego, California. On 10 June 2000, al-Mihdhar left San Diego to visit his wife in Yemen at a house also used as a communications hub for al-Qaeda. After the bombing, Yemeni Prime Minister Abdul Karim al-Iryani reported that al-Mihdhar had been one of the key planners of the attack and had been in the country at the time of the attacks. He later returned to the United States to participate in the 9/11 hijacking of American Airlines Flight 77, which flew into the Pentagon, killing 184 people.

=== Rescue ===
The first naval ship on the scene to assist the stricken Cole was HMS Marlborough, a Type 23 frigate of the British Royal Navy, under the command of Captain Anthony Rix. She was on passage to the UK after a six-month deployment in the Persian Gulf. Marlborough had full medical and damage control teams on board, and when her offer of assistance was accepted she immediately diverted to Aden. The sailors injured in the explosion were taken to the United States Army's Landstuhl Regional Medical Center near Ramstein (Note: The Naval History and Heritage Command claims they were flown to Rhein-Main Air Base before being flown to Norfolk), Germany, before being sent to the United States. Eleven of the most badly injured sailors were sent via medevac provided by the French Air Force to a French military hospital in Djibouti and underwent surgery before being sent with the rest of the injured seamen to Germany.

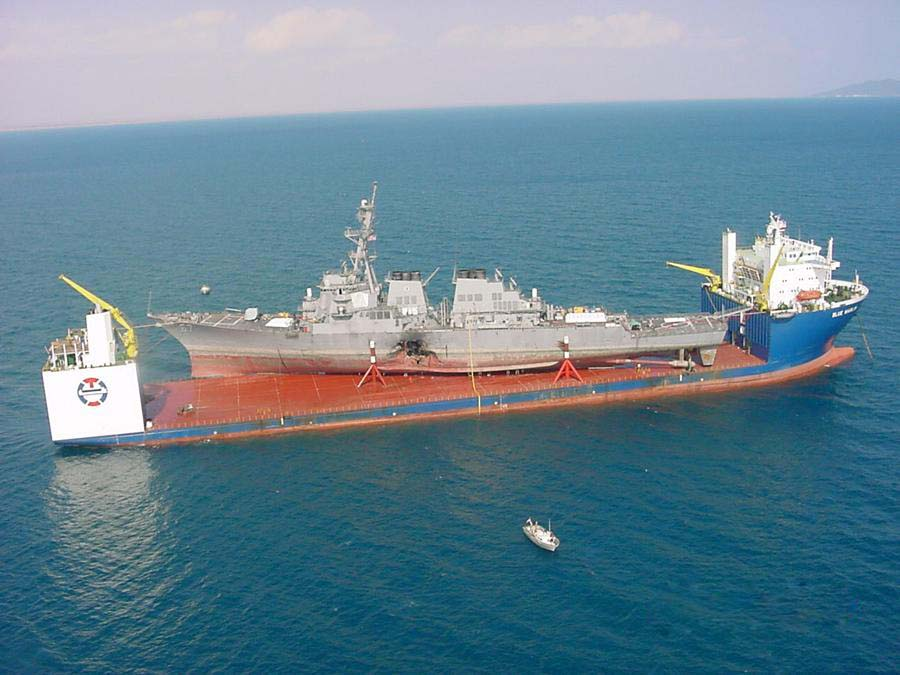
MV Blue Marlin carrying USS Cole

The first U.S. military support to arrive was a U.S. Air Force Security Forces Quick Reaction Force from the 363rd Expeditionary Security Forces Squadron, 363rd Air Expeditionary Wing, based in Prince Sultan Air Base, Saudi Arabia, transported by C-130 aircraft. They were followed by another small group of United States Marines from the Interim Marine Corps Security Force Company, Bahrain, flown in by P-3 Orion aircraft. Both forces landed a few hours after the ship was struck and were reinforced by a U.S Marine platoon with the 1st Fleet Antiterrorism Security Team Company (FAST), based out of Norfolk, Virginia. The Marines from 6th Platoon, 1st FAST arrived on 13 October from Norfolk.

USS Donald Cook and USS Hawes arrive in the vicinity of Aden that afternoon providing repair and logistical support. USNS Catawba, USS Camden, Anchorage, Duluth and Tarawa arrived in Aden some days later, providing watch relief crews, harbor security, damage control equipment, billeting, and food service for the crew of Cole. Landing craft (LCU) from the amphibious assault ships provided daily runs from Tarawa with hot food and supplies, and ferried personnel to and from all other naval vessels supporting Cole. In the remaining days LCU 1632 and various personnel from LCU 1666 teamed up to patrol around Cole.

== Investigation ==
In a form of transport pioneered in 1988 by USS Samuel B. Roberts aboard Mighty Servant 2, Cole was hauled from Aden aboard the Norwegian semi-submersible heavy lift salvage ship MV Blue Marlin. Cole arrived in Pascagoula, Mississippi, on 13 December 2000, where she was rebuilt.

FBI and NCIS agents sent to Yemen to investigate the bombing worked in an extremely hostile environment. They were met at the airport by Yemeni special forces with "...each soldier pointing an AK-47." Speakers in the Yemeni parliament "calling for jihad against America" were broadcast on local television each night. After some delay, the Yemenis produced a CCTV video from a harborside security camera, but the crucial moment of the explosion was deleted. At one point, the hotel where the agents stayed "was surrounded with men in traditional dress, some in Jeeps, all carrying guns." Finally the agents abandoned their hotel to stay at a US Navy vessel in the Bay of Aden, but they still did not feel safe. After being granted "permission from the Yemeni government to fly back to shore," an agent said their helicopter took evasive action during the flight due to fears of shoulder-launched surface-to-air missiles.

== Responsibility ==
On 14 March 2007, a federal judge in the United States, Robert G. Doumar, ruled that the Sudanese government was liable for the bombing.

The ruling was issued in response to a lawsuit filed against the Sudanese government by relatives of the victims, who claim that al-Qaeda could not have carried out the attacks without the support of Sudanese officials. The judge said:

There is substantial evidence in this case presented by the expert testimony that the government of Sudan induced the particular bombing of the Cole by virtue of prior actions of the government of Sudan.

On 25 July 2007, Doumar ordered the Sudanese government to pay $8 million to the families of the 17 sailors who died. He calculated the amount they should receive by multiplying the salary of the sailors by the number of years they would have continued to work. The following day, Sudan's Justice Minister Mohammed al-Mard said Sudan intended to appeal the ruling.

By May 2008, all defendants convicted in the attack had escaped from prison or been freed by Yemeni officials. On 30 June 2008, Brigadier General Thomas W. Hartmann, legal advisor to the U.S. military tribunal system, announced that charges were being sworn against Abd al-Rahim al-Nashiri, a Saudi Arabian citizen of Yemeni descent, who had been held at the military prison in Guantanamo Bay, Cuba, since 2006. Pentagon officials said the charges "organizing and directing" the Cole bombing still needed approval by a Department of Defense official who oversees military commissions set up for terrorism suspects. Pentagon officials said they would seek the death penalty.

In March 2015, U.S. federal judge Rudolph Contreras found both Iran and Sudan complicit in the 2000 bombing of the USS Cole by al-Qaeda, stating that "Iran was directly involved in establishing Al-Qaeda's Yemen network and supported training and logistics for Al-Qaeda in the Gulf region" through Hezbollah. Two previous federal judges had ruled that Sudan was liable for its role in the attack, but Contreras's "ruling is the first to find Iran partly responsible for the incident."

=== Alleged mastermind ===
Several people have been described as the Cole bombing mastermind. A Guantanamo Military Commission said Abd al-Rahim al-Nashiri, captured in late 2002, was the planner. Al-Nashiri was one of the three "high-value detainees" the George W. Bush administration would acknowledge had been subjected to waterboarding and other "enhanced interrogation techniques."

Abu Ali al-Harithi was one of the first suspected terrorists to be targeted by a missile-armed Predator drone. He, too, was described as the mastermind of the Cole bombing.

In 2003, the U.S. Justice Department indicted two people who were believed to have been the last main co-conspirators who were still at large, Jamal Ahmad Mohammad Al Badawi and Fahd al-Quso. Jamal Ahmad Mohammad Al Badawi was convicted in Yemen and sentenced to death. Fahd al-Quso was killed by a U.S. drone strike on 6 May 2012. Al-Badawi, also called a "mastermind" of the Cole bombing, was one of seventeen captives who escaped through a tunnel from a Yemeni jail in 2006. Al-Badawi was killed in a drone strike on 1 January 2019 in the Marib governate, Yemen.

Tawfiq bin Attash, who was captured in Pakistan in 2003 and is currently being held in U.S. custody at Guantanamo Bay, was "considered the mastermind" of the bombing. An al-Qaeda commander in Yemen also confirmed that another co-conspirator in the bombing, Abdul Mun'im Salim al-Fatahani, was killed in a U.S. drone strike on 31 January 2012. On 6 May 2012, officials from the Yemen government reported that al-Quso was killed in an airstrike earlier in the day in southern Yemen. The report was later confirmed by U.S. officials and al-Qaeda's media network As-Sahab.

== Aftermath ==
=== Rules of engagement ===
Approximate location of bombing, Aden Harbor, Yemen

The destroyer's rules of engagement, as approved by the Pentagon, forbade guards to fire upon the small boat (which was not known to be loaded with explosives) without permission from Cole's captain or another officer.

Petty Officer John Washak said that right after the blast, a senior chief petty officer ordered him to turn an M-60 machine gun on Cole's fantail away from a second small boat approaching. "With blood still on my face", he said, he was told: "That's the rules of engagement: no shooting unless we're shot at." He added, "In the military, it's like we're trained to hesitate now. If somebody had seen something wrong and shot, he probably would have been court-martialed." Petty Officer Jennifer Kudrick said that if the sentries had fired on the suicide craft, "we would have gotten in more trouble for shooting two foreigners than losing seventeen American sailors."

=== Consequences ===
President Bill Clinton declared, "If, as it now appears, this was an act of terrorism, it was a despicable and cowardly act. We will find out who was responsible and hold them accountable."

On 19 January 2001, the U.S. Navy completed and released its Judge Advocate General Manual (JAGMAN) investigation of the incident, concluding that Cole's commanding officer Commander Kirk Lippold "acted reasonably in adjusting his force protection posture based on his assessment of the situation that presented itself" when Cole arrived in Aden to refuel. The JAGMAN investigation also concluded that "the commanding officer of Cole did not have the specific intelligence, focused training, appropriate equipment or on-scene security support to effectively prevent or deter such a determined, preplanned assault on his ship", and recommended significant changes in Navy procedures. In spite of this finding, Lippold was subsequently denied promotion and retired at the same rank of commander in 2007.

In Afghanistan the bombing was a "great victory for bin Laden. Al-Qaeda camps filled with new recruits, and contributors from the Gulf States arrived with petrodollars."

Both Clinton and his successor George W. Bush had been criticized for failing to respond militarily to the attack on Cole before 11 September 2001. The 9/11 Commission Report cites one source who said in February 2001, "[bin Laden] complained frequently that the United States had not yet attacked. According to the source, Bin Laden wanted the United States to attack, and if it did not he would launch something bigger."

Evidence of al-Qaeda's involvement was inconclusive for months after the attack. The staff of the 9/11 Commission found that al-Qaeda's direction of the bombing was under investigation but "increasingly clear" on 11 November 2000. It was an "unproven assumption" in late November. By 21 December the CIA had made a "preliminary judgment" that "al Qaeda appeared to have supported the attack" without a "definitive conclusion".

Accounts thereafter are varied and somewhat contradictory. Then-National Security Advisor Condoleezza Rice told the Commission that when the administration took office on 20 January 2001; "We knew that there was speculation that the 2000 Cole attack was al Qaeda. We received, I think, on January 25 the same assessment [of Al-Qaeda responsibility]. It was preliminary. It was not clear." On 9 February, Vice President Dick Cheney was briefed on bin Laden's responsibility "without hedge." One report stated that "six days after Bush took office", the FBI "believed they had clear evidence tying the bombers to Al Qaeda."

These conclusions are contrasted by testimony of key figures before the 9/11 Commission, summarized in the 9/11 Commission Report. Former CIA director George Tenet testified (page 196) that he "believed he laid out what was knowable early in the investigation, and that this evidence never really changed until after 9/11." The report suggests (pages 201–202) that the official assessment was similarly vague until at least March 2001:

On 25 January, Tenet briefed the President on the Cole investigation. The written briefing repeated for top officials of the new administration what the CIA had told the Clinton White House in November. This included the "preliminary judgment" that al Qaeda was responsible, with the caveat that no evidence had yet been found that Bin Ladin himself ordered the attack in March 2001, the CIA's briefing slides for Rice were still describing the CIA's "preliminary judgment" that a "strong circumstantial case" could be made against al Qaeda but noting that the CIA continued to lack "conclusive information on external command and control" of the attack.

According to Rice, the decision not to respond militarily to the Cole bombing was President Bush's. She said he "made clear to us that he did not want to respond to al Qaeda one attack at a time. He told me he was 'tired of swatting flies.'" The administration instead began work on a new strategy to eliminate al-Qaeda.

As a result of the Cole bombing, the U.S. Navy began to reassess its anti-terrorism and force protection methods, both at home and abroad. The Navy stepped up Random Anti-Terrorism Measures (RAM), which are meant to complicate the planning of a terrorist contemplating an attack by making it difficult to discern a predictable pattern to security posture.

In November 2001, the Navy opened an Anti-Terrorism and Force Protection Warfare Center at Naval Amphibious Base (NAB) Little Creek, in Virginia Beach, Virginia, with the objective of developing tactics, equipment and training to combat terrorists.

On 3 November 2002, a CIA-operated Predator UAV fired an AGM-114 Hellfire missile at a vehicle in Yemen carrying Abu Ali al-Harithi, a suspected planner of the bombing plot. Also in the vehicle was Kamal Derwish, a.k.a. Ahmed Hijazi, a U.S. citizen and four suspected Yemeni terrorists. All six were killed in the strike.

On 29 September 2004, a Yemeni judge sentenced Abd al-Rahim al-Nashiri and Jamal al-Badawi to death for their roles in the bombing. Al-Nashiri, believed to be the operation's mastermind, was detained by the United States at Guantanamo Bay.

In October 2004 the Navy consolidated the forces it deploys for anti-terrorism and force protection under a single command at NAB Little Creek. The new Maritime Force Protection Command (MARFPCOM) was activated to oversee the administration and training of the expeditionary units the Navy deploys overseas to protect ships, aircraft and bases from terrorist attack. MARFPCOM aligned four existing components: the Mobile Security Forces, Naval Coastal Warfare, Explosive Ordnance Disposal (EOD), and Expeditionary Mobile Diving and Salvage Forces.

On 3 February 2006, 23 suspected or convicted al-Qaeda members escaped from jail in Yemen. This number included 13 who were convicted of the bombings of Cole and the French tanker MV Limburg in 2002. Among those who reportedly escaped was Al-Badawi. Al-Qaeda's Yemeni number two Abu Assem al-Ahdal may also have escaped.

On 17 October 2007, al-Badawi surrendered to Yemeni authorities as part of an agreement with Al-Qaeda militants. Following his surrender, Yemeni authorities released him in return for a pledge not to engage in any violent or Al-Qaeda-related activity, despite a US$5 million reward for his capture. Two other escapees remained at large.

In June 2008 the United States charged Abd al-Rahim al-Nashiri with planning and conducting the attack. The United States planned to seek the death penalty in his case. On 5 February 2009, the United States dropped all charges against al-Nashiri "without prejudice" to comply with President Obama's order to shut down the military prison at Guantanamo Bay, but reserved the right to file charges at a later date.

In 2009, U.S. federal judge Kimba Wood released $13.4 million in frozen assets belonging to Sudan, to be awarded to 33 spouses, parents, and children of the sailors killed in the attack. The money was awarded based on the 2002 Terrorism Risk Insurance Act and spearheaded by Miami Attorney Andrew C. Hall. Previously, the court had found Sudan culpable in facilitating the attack on the destroyer. John Clodfelter, father of Kenneth Clodfelter who was killed in the bombing, said; "It's about time something was done. It's taken so much more time than we thought it should take."

On 1 January 2019 Jamal al-Badawi died in a U.S. air strike, President Donald Trump confirmed. U.S. defense officials said a "precision strike" was carried out east of the Yemeni capital, Sanaa.

Another lawsuit against Sudan was filed in the United States District Court for the District of Columbia in 2010 by 15 of the Cole sailors and three spouses, seeking damages from the country for knowingly supporting the terrorists that struck the ship. While the court action had been served to the Sudan embassy in Washington D.C., no representative of Sudan replied to the case or appeared at the hearing. A default judgement was awarded to the sailors for more than US$314 million in 2012. In the process of serving the necessary paperwork and actions to obtain the monetary damages from Sudan within the United States Court of Appeals for the Second Circuit, representatives of Sudan challenged the DC District Court ruling, arguing that under the Foreign Sovereign Immunities Act (FSIA) which allows for private lawsuits to be filed against foreign nations, the original case paperwork was not properly sent to their embassy in Sudan. Lawyers for the sailors argued that rejecting this would require them to rehold the initial trial and re-determine guilt and damages, if any. The Second Circuit upheld that the paperwork was filed appropriately, leading the representatives of Sudan to petition the Supreme Court of the United States for writ of certiorari on the question of whether the initial paperwork was properly addressed. The Supreme Court accepted the case, Republic of Sudan v. Harrison (Docket 16–1094) and took oral arguments on 9 November 2018. In March 2019, the Supreme Court vacated the Second Circuit's decision and overturned the award.

The Cole bombing plays a highly visible role in Navy damage-control training, which begins in boot camp with a pre-graduation Battle Stations event. "The Cole Scenario", launched in 2007, takes place aboard a realistic destroyer mock-up housed at Naval Station Great Lakes, Illinois. The training focuses on preparing recruits for damage control challenges they may face in the fleet.

On 13 February 2020, the Government of Sudan announced that it had reached an agreement to compensate the families of the USS Cole victims, a prerequisite for being removed from the State Sponsors of Terrorism list. In its announcement, the Sudanese government reiterated that it was not responsible for the bombing but stated that its goal was to normalize relations with the United States and other countries and to settle historical claims arising from the previous regime. The bilateral claims agreement was signed on October 30, 2020, under which Sudan agreed to pay $335 million in compensation to resolve the claims brought by U.S. families of the victims of the attack on the USS Cole (and the victims of the 1998 bombings of the U.S. embassies in Tanzania and Kenya).

In a 28 February 2026 video announcing the start of American and Israeli strikes on Iran, Trump pointed to Iran's "probabl[e] involve[ment]" in the bombing as one of the justifications for the operation.

== Memorial ==
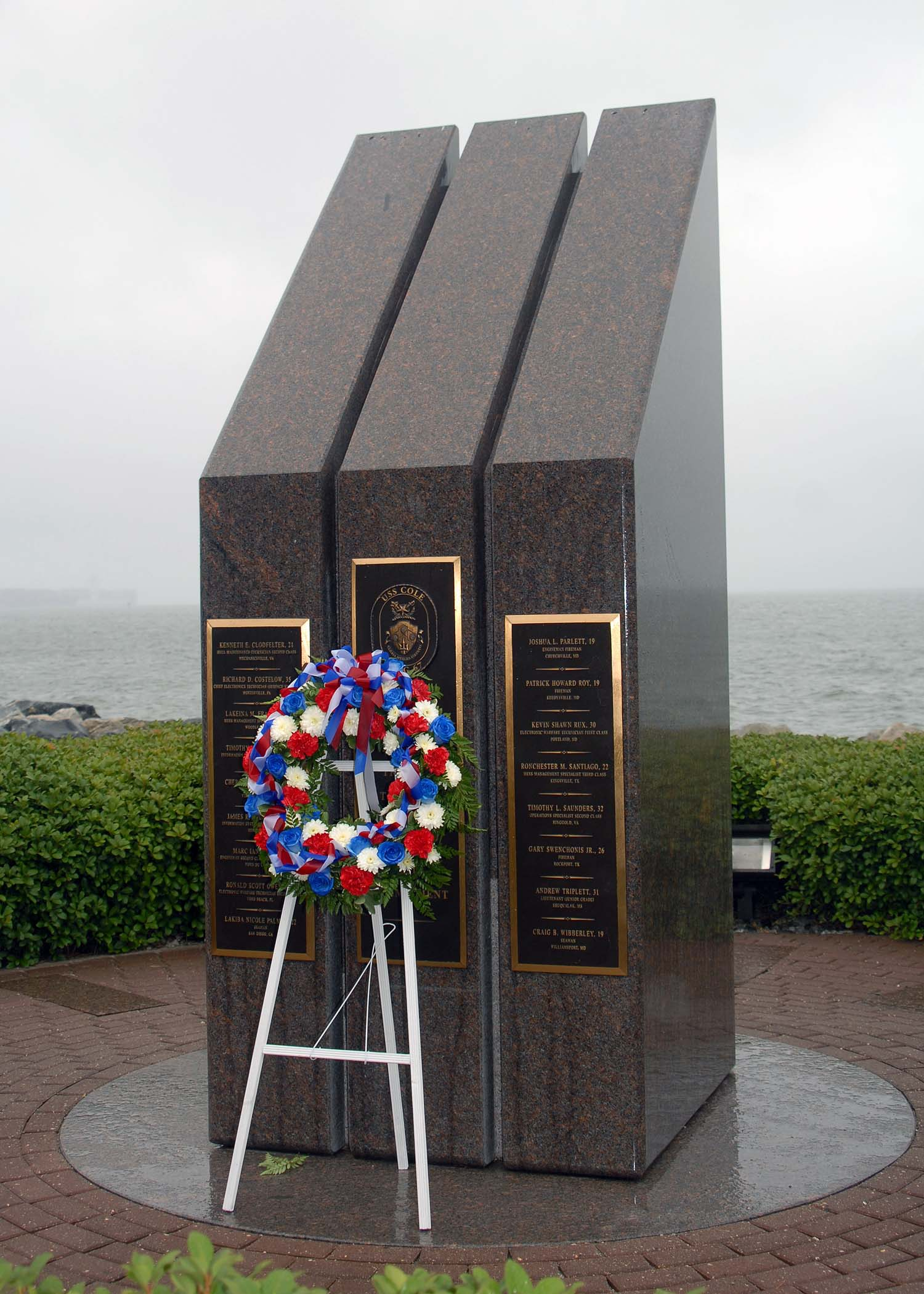
A wreath laid by the crew of USS Cole at the Norfolk Naval Station memorial, 12 October 2001.

A memorial to the victims of the attack was dedicated at Norfolk Naval Station in Virginia on 12 October 2001. It was erected along the shore of Willoughby Bay, and overlooks the channel used by Navy ships transiting to sea. Seventeen low-level markers stand for the youthfulness of the sailors, whose lives were cut short. Three tall granite monoliths, each bearing brass plaques, stand for the three colors of the American flag. A set of brown markers encircling the memorial symbolize the darkness and despair that overcame the ship. In addition, 28 black pine trees were planted to represent the 17 sailors and the 11 children they left behind.

The memorial was funded by contributions from thousands of private individuals and businesses to the Navy-Marine Corps Relief Society, which gave the memorial to the Navy. Its design originated as a vision of USS Cole crew members, who then teamed with Navy architects and the Society to finalize the project. The Cole memorial is located about 500 feet (150 m) west of the Naval Station memorial for the USS Iowa turret explosion. There is also another memorial marker placed at Wisconsin Square in the city of Norfolk, near USS Wisconsin.

== See also ==
- Nasir Ahmad Nasir al-Bahri
- Bombing of SLNS Sooraya and SLNS Ranasuru
- List of terrorist incidents, 2000
- Attacks on the United States
