= Eatinger =

Eatinger is a surname. Notable people with the surname include:

- Robert Eatinger (born 1957), American lawyer
- Stephen Eatinger (born 1975), American country music artist
