= Enhanced interrogation techniques =

Program of torture by the US government

The US and suspected CIA "black sites" Extraordinary renditions have been carried out from these countries Detainees have been transported through these countries Detainees have arrived in these countries Sources: Amnesty International Human Rights Watch

"Enhanced interrogation techniques" or "enhanced interrogation" was a program of systematic torture of detainees by the Central Intelligence Agency (CIA), the Defense Intelligence Agency (DIA) and various components of the US Armed Forces at remote sites around the world — including Abu Ghraib, Bagram, Guantanamo Bay, Rabat (Temara interrogation centre), Udon Thani (Udorn Royal Thai Air Force Base), Vilnius (in Antaviliai), Bucharest and Stare Kiejkuty — authorized by officials of the George W. Bush administration. Methods used included beating, binding in contorted stress positions, hooding, subjection to deafening noise, sleep disruption, sleep deprivation to the point of hallucination, deprivation of food, drink, and medical care for wounds, waterboarding, walling, sexual humiliation, rape, sexual assault, subjection to extreme heat or extreme cold, and confinement in coffin-like boxes. A Guantanamo inmate's drawings of some of these tortures, to which he was subjected, were published in The New York Times. Some techniques fall under the category of "white room torture". Several detainees endured medically unnecessary "rectal rehydration", "rectal fluid resuscitation", and "rectal feeding". In addition to brutalizing detainees, there were threats to their families such as threats to harm children, and threats to sexually abuse or to cut the throat of detainees' mothers.

The number of detainees subjected to these methods has never been authoritatively established, nor how many died as a result of the interrogation, though this number could be as high as 100. The CIA admits to waterboarding three people implicated in the September 11 attacks: Abu Zubaydah, Khalid Sheikh Mohammed, and Mohammed al-Qahtani. A Senate Intelligence Committee found photos of a waterboard surrounded by buckets of water at the Salt Pit prison, where the CIA had claimed that waterboarding was never used. Former guards and inmates at Guantánamo have said that deaths which the US military called suicides were in fact homicides under torture. No murder charges have been brought for these or for acknowledged torture-related homicides at Abu Ghraib and at Bagram.

From the outset, there were concerns and allegations expressed that "enhanced interrogation" violated US anti-torture statutes or international laws such as the UN Convention against Torture. In 2005, the CIA destroyed videotapes depicting prisoners being interrogated under torture; an internal justification was that what they showed was so horrific they would be "devastating to the CIA", and that "the heat from destroying [the videotapes] is nothing compared to what it would be if the tapes ever got into public domain". The United Nations special rapporteur on torture, professor Juan E. Méndez, stated that waterboarding is torture and "immoral and illegal". In 2008, 56 Democratic Party members of the US Congress asked for an independent investigation.

American and European officials including former CIA director Leon Panetta, former CIA officers, a Guantanamo prosecutor, and a military tribunal judge have called "enhanced interrogation" a euphemism for torture. In 2009, President Barack Obama and Attorney General Eric Holder said that certain techniques amount to torture and repudiated their use. They declined to prosecute CIA, US Department of Defense, or Bush administration officials who authorized the program, while leaving open the possibility of convening an investigatory "Truth Commission" for what President Obama called a "further accounting". In July 2014, the European Court of Human Rights ruled that "enhanced interrogation" was tantamount to torture, and ordered Poland to pay restitution to men tortured at a CIA black site there. In December 2014, the Senate published around 10% of the Senate Intelligence Committee report on CIA torture, a report about the CIA's use of torture during the George W. Bush administration.

== History of approval by the Bush administration ==
Almost immediately after the 9/11 attacks, Bush administration officials conferring by video link from bunkers decided to treat the attacks as acts of war, rather than crimes. The question of whether or not captured prisoners should be treated as prisoners of war arose. Officials including Justice Department lawyer John Yoo recommended classifying them as "detainees" outside the protection of the Geneva Conventions or any other domestic or military law, and incarcerating them in special prisons instead of the barracks-like "prisoner-of-war camp you saw in Hogan's Heroes or Stalag 17." On September 17, 2001, President Bush signed a still-classified directive giving the CIA the power to secretly imprison and interrogate detainees.

In late 2001, the first detainees including men like Murat Kurnaz and Lakhdar Boumediene, later established to be innocent and arrested on flawed intelligence or sold to the CIA for bounties, were brought to hastily improvised CIA/military bases such as Kandahar, Afghanistan. They were subjected to beatings, electric shocks, exposure to extreme cold, suspension from the ceiling by their arms, and drowning in buckets of water. An unknown number died as a result. In late 2001 and early 2002, interrogation under torture at secret sites was still ad hoc, not yet organized as a bureaucratic program, nor sanctioned under US Justice Department legal cover.

As early as November 2001, the CIA general counsel began considering the legality of torture, writing that "the Israeli example" (using physical force against hundreds of detainees) could serve as "a possible basis for arguing ... torture was necessary to prevent imminent, significant, physical harm to persons, where there is no other available means to prevent the harm." In April 2002, the CIA had captured its first important prisoner, Abu Zubaydah, who was transferred to a CIA black site and at the suggestion of psychologist James Mitchell the CIA embarked on interrogation methods which included sleep deprivation using bright lights and loud music – still prior to any legal authorization from the US Justice Department. Later that April, Mitchell proposed a list of additional tactics, including locking people in cramped boxes, shackling them in painful positions, keeping them awake for a week at a time, covering them with insects, and waterboarding, a practice which the United States had previously characterized in war crimes prosecutions as torture.

Jose Rodriguez, head of the CIA's clandestine service, asked his superiors for authorization for what Rodriguez called an "alternative set of interrogation procedures". The CIA sought immunity from prosecution, sometimes known as a "get out of jail free card". In May 2002, senior Bush administration officials including CIA director George Tenet, National Security Advisor Condoleezza Rice, Vice President Dick Cheney, Secretary of State Colin Powell, Defense Secretary Donald Rumsfeld, and Attorney General John Ashcroft met to discuss which techniques the CIA could legally use against Abu Zubaydah. Condoleezza Rice recalled "being told that U.S. military personnel were subjected in training to certain physical and psychological interrogation techniques". During the discussions, John Ashcroft is reported to have said, "Why are we talking about this in the White House? History will not judge this kindly."

Jay Bybee, head of the Department of Justice's Office of Legal Counsel, collaborated with John Yoo to draft and sign what are now known as the Torture Memos. These classified memoranda legalized a number of torture techniques for use on detainees by very narrowly defining torture and expansively defining executive authority. After the Justice Department completed the Torture Memos, Condoleezza Rice told the CIA that the techniques were approved in July 2002. Dick Cheney said "I signed off on it; so did others." In 2010 Cheney said, "I was and remain a strong proponent of our enhanced interrogation program." In 2009 Rice said "[w]e never tortured anyone"; she maintained the abuse was "not torture", but was "legal", and "right".

In addition, in 2002 and 2003, the CIA says they briefed several congressional leaders on the proposed "enhanced interrogation technique" program. These congressional leaders included Nancy Pelosi, the future Speaker of the House, House Intelligence Committee Ranking Member Jane Harman, as well as House Intelligence Committee Chair Porter J. Goss and Senator Pat Roberts. The response to the briefings was "quiet acquiescence, if not downright support", according to officials present. Harman was the only congressional leader to object to the tactics being proposed. Former senator Bob Graham (D-Fla.), chairman of the Senate intelligence committee after the 9/11 attacks, said he was not briefed on waterboarding and that in three instances agency officials said he'd attended briefings on days that his personal journal shows he was elsewhere.

At least one Bush administration official opposed torturing prisoners, Condoleezza Rice's most senior adviser Philip Zelikow. Upon learning details of the program, Zelikow wrote a memo to Rice contesting the Justice Department's Torture Memos, believing them wrong both legally and as a matter of policy. Zelikow's memo warned that the interrogation techniques breached US law, and could lead to prosecutions for war crimes. The Bush administration attempted to collect all the copies of Zelikow's memo and destroy them. Jane Mayer, author of The Dark Side, quotes Zelikow as predicting that "America's descent into torture will in time be viewed like the Japanese internments", in that "(f)ear and anxiety were exploited by zealots and fools."

== Development of techniques and training ==
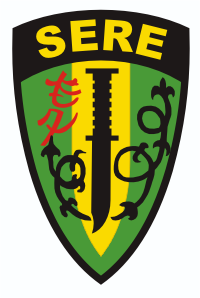
West Coast, Navy SERE Insignia

The authorized "enhanced interrogation" (the originator of this term is unknown, but it appears to be a calque of the German "Verschärfte Vernehmung", meaning "intensified interrogation", used in 1937 by Gestapo chief Heinrich Müller) was based on work done by James Elmer Mitchell and Bruce Jessen in the Air Force's Survival Evasion Resistance Escape (SERE) program. The CIA contracted with the two psychologists to develop alternative, harsh interrogation techniques. However, neither of the two psychologists had any experience in conducting interrogations. Air Force Reserve Colonel Steve Kleinman stated that the CIA "chose two clinical psychologists who had no intelligence background whatsoever, who had never conducted an interrogation ... to do something that had never been proven in the real world." Associates of Mitchell and Jessen were skeptical of their methods and believed they did not possess any data about the impact of SERE training on the human psyche. The CIA came to learn that Mitchell and Jessen's expertise in waterboarding was probably "misrepresented", and thus there was no reason to believe it was medically safe or effective. Despite these shortcomings of experience and know-how, the two psychologists boasted of being paid $1,000 a day (equivalent to $1,790 in 2025) plus expenses, tax-free by the CIA for their work.

The SERE program, which Mitchell and Jessen would reverse engineer, was used to train pilots and other soldiers on how to resist "brainwashing" techniques assumed to have been employed by the Chinese to extract false confessions from captured Americans during the Korean War. The program subjected trainees to "waterboarding ... sleep deprivation, isolation, exposure to extreme temperatures, enclosure in tiny spaces, bombardment with agonizing sounds at extremely damaging decibel levels, and religious and sexual humiliation", including forced enemas and other anal assault. Under CIA supervision, Miller and Jessen adapted SERE into an offensive program designed to train CIA agents on how to use the harsh interrogation techniques to gather information from terrorist detainees. In fact, all of the tactics listed above would later be reported in the International Committee of the Red Cross Report on Fourteen High Value Detainees in CIA Custody as having been used on Abu Zubaydah.

The psychologists relied heavily on experiments done by American psychologist Martin Seligman in the 1970s on learned helplessness. In these experiments caged dogs were exposed to severe electric shocks in a random way in order to completely break their will to resist. Mitchell and Jessen applied this idea to the interrogation of Abu Zubaydah. Many of the interrogation techniques used in the SERE program, including waterboarding, cold cell, long-time standing, and sleep deprivation were previously considered illegal under US and international law and treaties at the time of Abu Zubaydah's capture. In fact, the United States had prosecuted Japanese military officials after World War II and American soldiers after the Vietnam War for waterboarding. In 1983, Texas Sheriff James Parker "was charged, along with three of his deputies, for handcuffing prisoners to chairs, placing towels over their faces, and pouring water on the cloth until they gave what the officers considered to be confessions. The sheriff and his deputies were all convicted and sentenced to four years in prison." Since 1930, the United States had defined sleep deprivation as an illegal form of torture. Many other techniques developed by the CIA constitute inhuman and degrading treatment and torture under the United Nations Convention against Torture and Article 3 of the European Convention on Human Rights.

According to Human Rights First, "Internal FBI memos and press reports have pointed to SERE training as the basis for some of the harshest techniques authorised for use on detainees by the Pentagon in 2002 and 2003." Salon stated: "A March 22, 2005, sworn statement by the former chief of the Interrogation Control Element at Guantánamo said instructors from SERE also taught their methods to interrogators of the prisoners in Cuba." For The New Yorker, journalist Jane Mayer reported:

According to the SERE affiliate and two other sources familiar with the program, after September 11 several psychologists versed in SERE techniques began advising interrogators at Guantánamo Bay and elsewhere. Some of these psychologists essentially "tried to reverse-engineer" the SERE program, as the affiliate put it. "They took good knowledge and used it in a bad way", another of the sources said. Interrogators and BSCT members at Guantánamo adopted coercive techniques similar to those employed in the SERE program.

The report said that "many of the interrogation methods used in SERE training seem to have been applied at Guantánamo." A bipartisan report released in 2008 stated:

a February 2002 memorandum signed by President George W. Bush, stating that the Third Geneva Convention guaranteeing humane treatment to prisoners of war did not apply to al-Qaeda or Taliban detainees, and a December 2002 memo signed by former Defense Secretary Donald Rumsfeld, approving the use of "aggressive techniques" against detainees held at Guantanamo Bay, as key factors that lead to the extensive abuses.

The Bush administration's February 2002 memorandum had in fact stated that only al-Qaeda detainees were not covered by the Geneva Conventions. That same order held that Taliban detainees would be entitled to treatment under Common Article 3 of the Geneva Conventions. These standards were ordered for all detainees in 2006, al-Qaeda members included, following the Supreme Court's ruling in Hamdan v. Rumsfeld. Donald Rumsfeld rescinded his December 2002 memo after six weeks. Common Article 3 remained the policy under the Obama administration, and not the balance of the Third Geneva Convention.

=== Central Intelligence Agency ===
The US Senate Report on CIA Detention Interrogation Program that details the use of torture during CIA detention and interrogation.

A Congressional bipartisan report in December 2008 established:

harsh interrogation techniques used by the CIA and the U.S. military were directly adapted from the training techniques used to prepare special forces personnel to resist interrogation by enemies that torture and abuse prisoners. The techniques included forced nudity, painful stress positions, sleep deprivation, and until 2003, waterboarding, a form of simulated drowning.

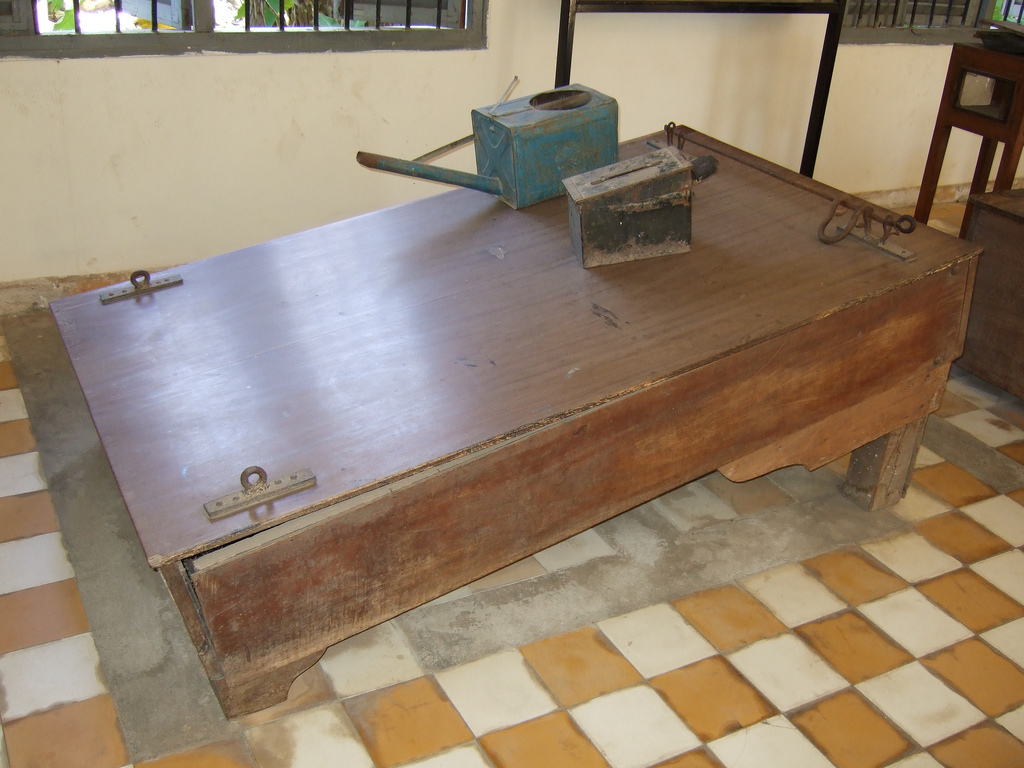
Waterboard on display at the Tuol Sleng Genocide Museum: prisoners' feet were shackled to the bar on the right, wrists restrained by shackles on the left. Water was poured over the face using the watering can.

According to ABC News, former and current CIA officials have come forward to reveal details of interrogation techniques authorized in the CIA. These include:

1. Waterboarding: The prisoner is bound to a declined board, feet raised and head slightly below the feet. Material is wrapped over the prisoner's face and water is poured over them, asphyxiating the prisoner.
2. Hypothermia: The prisoner is left to stand naked in a cell kept near 50 °F (10 °C), while being regularly doused with cold water in order to increase the rate at which heat is lost from the body.
3. Stress positions: Prisoners are forced to stand, handcuffed and with their feet shackled to an eye bolt in the floor (and/or wall), for more than 40 hours, causing the prisoners' weight to be placed on just one or two muscles. This creates an intense amount of pressure on the legs, leading first to pain and then muscle failure.
4. Abdomen strikes: A hard, open-handed slap is dealt to the prisoner's abdomen. Doctors consulted over the matter advised against using a punch, which could cause lasting internal damage.
5. Insult slap: An open-handed slap is delivered to the prisoner's face, aimed at causing pain and triggering fear.
6. Shaking: The interrogator forcefully grabs the front of the prisoner's shirt and shakes the prisoner.

In December 2007, CIA director Michael Hayden stated that "of about 100 prisoners held to date in the CIA program, the enhanced techniques were used on about 30, and waterboarding used on just three."

The report, "Experiments in Torture: Human Subject Research and Evidence of Experimentation in the 'Enhanced' Interrogation Program", published by the advocacy group Physicians for Human Rights, described personnel in the CIA's Office of Medical Services (OMS) performing research on the prisoners as the above techniques were used both serially and in combination. This report was based on previously classified documents made available by the Obama administration in 2010. According to ABC News in 2007, the CIA removed waterboarding from its list of acceptable interrogation techniques in 2006. ABC stated further that the last use of waterboarding was in 2003.

=== Defense Intelligence Agency ===
In 2003, the Defense Secretary Donald Rumsfeld's "Working Group" on interrogations requested that the DIA come up with prisoner interrogation techniques for the group's consideration. According to the 2008 Senate Armed Services Committee report on the treatment of detainees in US custody, the DIA began drawing up the list of techniques with the help of its civilian employee, a former Guantanamo Interrogation Control Element (ICE) Chief David Becker. Becker claimed that the Working Group members were particularly interested in aggressive methods and that he "was encouraged to talk about techniques that inflict pain."

A declassified FBI correspondence alleging DIA use of gay porn and humiliating techniques in interrogations

Becker claimed that he recommended the use of drugs due to rumors that another intelligence agency, name of which was redacted in the Senate report, had successfully used them in the past. According to the analysis of the Office of Defense Inspector General, the DIA's cited justification for the use of drugs was to "[relax] detainee to cooperative state" and that mind-altering substances were not used.

Some more lurid revelations of DIA's harsh interrogations came from FBI officers, who conducted their own screenings of detainees in Guantanamo along with other agencies. According to one account, the interrogators of what was then DIA's Defense HUMINT Service (currently the Defense Clandestine Service), forced subjects to watch gay porn, draped them with the Israeli Flag and interrogated them in rooms lit by strobe lights for 16–18 hours, all the while telling prisoners that they were from the FBI.

The real FBI operative was concerned that DIA's harsh methods and impersonation of FBI agents would complicate the Bureau's ability to do its job properly, saying "The next time a real Agent tries to talk to that guy, you can imagine the result." A subsequent military inquiry countered FBI's allegations by saying that the prisoner treatment was degrading but not inhuman, without addressing the allegation of DIA staff regularly impersonating FBI officers—usually a felony offense. A year before this investigation was concluded, it was revealed that interrogations by special units of the US military services were much harsher and more physical than any of the above DIA practices, to the point that 2 DIA officials reportedly complained, after which they were threatened by non-DIA interrogators.

Similar activities are thought to have transpired at the hands of DIA operatives in Bagram, where as recently as 2010 the organization ran the so-called "Black jail". According to a report published by The Atlantic, the jail was manned by DIA's DCHC staff, who were accused of beating and sexually humiliating high-value targets held at the site. The detention center outlived the black sites ran by the Central Intelligence Agency, with the DIA continuing to use "restricted" interrogation methods in the facility under a secret authorization. It is unclear what happened to the secret facility after the 2013 transfer of the base to Afghan authorities following several postponements.

=== US Armed Forces ===
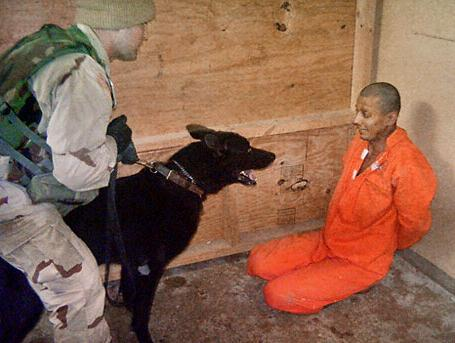
An Army investigator counted the use of unmuzzled dogs at Abu Ghraib as among the "sadistic, blatant, and wanton criminal abuses" by US troops.

The following techniques were authorized by the US military:

1. Yelling
2. Loud music, and light control
3. Environmental manipulation
4. Sleep deprivation/adjustment
5. Stress positions
6. 20-hour interrogations
7. Controlled fear (including use of dogs)

In November 2006, former U.S. Army Brigadier General Janis Karpinski, in charge of Abu Ghraib prison until early 2004, reported seeing a letter apparently signed by United States Secretary of Defense Donald Rumsfeld that allowed contractors employed by the US to use techniques such as sleep deprivation during interrogation. Karpinski stated that the "methods consisted of making prisoners stand for long periods, sleep deprivation ... playing music at full volume, having to sit uncomfortably" and that "Rumsfeld authorized these specific techniques." She said that she considered this treatment to be contrary to the Geneva Conventions, which state "Prisoners of war who refuse to answer may not be threatened, insulted, or exposed to any unpleasant or disadvantageous treatment of any kind." According to Karpinski, the handwritten signature was above his printed name and in the same handwriting in the margin was written, "Make sure this is accomplished."

On May 1, 2005, The New York Times reported on an ongoing high-level military investigation into accusations of detainee abuse at Guantánamo, conducted by Lieutenant General Randall M. Schmidt of the Air Force, and dealing with: "accounts by agents for the Federal Bureau of Investigation who complained after witnessing detainees subjected to several forms of harsh treatment. The FBI agents wrote in memorandums that were never meant to be disclosed publicly that they had seen female interrogators forcibly squeeze male prisoners' genitals, and that they had witnessed other detainees stripped and shackled low to the floor for many hours."

On July 12, 2005, members of a military panel told the committee that they proposed disciplining prison commander Major General Geoffrey Miller over the interrogation of Mohammed al Qahtani, who was forced to wear a bra, dance with another man, and threatened with dogs. The recommendation was overruled by General Bantz J. Craddock, commander of U.S. Southern Command, who referred the matter to the army's inspector general. In an interview with AP on February 14, 2008, Paul Rester, chief military interrogator at Guantanamo Bay and director of the Joint Intelligence Group, said most of the information gathered from detainees came from non-coercive questioning and "rapport building", not harsh interrogation methods.

=== American Psychological Association ===
The American Psychological Association (APA), the primary professional organization of psychologists in the United States, collaborated with the Bush administration in secret to write legal and ethical justifications for the torture.

== Initial reports and complaints ==
In 2006, senior law enforcement agents with the Criminal Investigation Task Force told MSNBC.com that they began to complain in 2002 inside the U.S. Department of Defense that the interrogation tactics used in Guantanamo Bay by a separate team of military intelligence investigators were unproductive, not likely to produce reliable information, and probably illegal. Unable to get satisfaction from the army commanders running the detainee camp, they took their concerns to David Brant, director of the Naval Criminal Investigative Service (NCIS), who alerted Navy General Counsel Alberto J. Mora.

General Counsel Mora and Navy Judge Advocate General Michael Lohr believed the detainee treatment to be unlawful, and campaigned among other top lawyers and officials in the Defense Department to investigate, and to provide clear standards prohibiting coercive interrogation tactics. In response, on January 15, 2003, Rumsfeld suspended the approved interrogation tactics at Guantánamo Bay until a new set of guidelines could be produced by a working group headed by General Counsel of the Air Force Mary Walker.

The working group based its new guidelines on a legal memo from the United States Department of Justice Office of Legal Counsel written by John Yoo and signed by Jay S. Bybee in August 2002, which would later become widely known as the "Torture Memo". General Counsel Mora led a faction of the Working Group in arguing against these standards, and argued the issues with Yoo in person. The working group's final report was signed and delivered to Guantánamo without the knowledge of Mora and the others who had opposed its content. Mora has maintained that detainee treatment has been consistent with the law since the January 15, 2003, suspension of previously approved interrogation tactics.

It was not known publicly until 2008 that Yoo wrote another legal opinion, dated March 14, 2003, which he issued to the General Counsel of DOD, five days before the invasion of Iraq started. In it, he concluded that federal laws related to torture and other abuse did not apply to interrogators overseas – which at that time the administration applied to Guantanamo as well as locations such as Iraq.

== Public positions and reactions ==
President Bush stated "The United States of America does not torture. And that's important for people around the world to understand." The administration adopted the Detainee Treatment Act of 2005 to address the multitude of incidents of detainee abuse. However, in his signing statement, Bush made clear that he reserved the right to waive this bill if he thought that was needed. Porter Goss, the Director of Central Intelligence, in testimony before the Senate Armed Services Committee on March 17, 2005, described waterboarding as falling into the area of "professional interrogation techniques", differentiating them from torture. The Washington Post reported in January 2009 that Susan J. Crawford, convening authority of military commissions, stated about the interrogation of Mohammed al-Qahtani, one of the alleged "20th hijackers" of the September 11 attacks:

The techniques they used were all authorized, but the manner in which they applied them was overly aggressive and too persistent. ... You think of torture, you think of some horrendous physical act done to an individual. This was not any one particular act; this was just a combination of things that had a medical impact on him, that hurt his health. It was abusive and uncalled for. And coercive. Clearly coercive. It was that medical impact that pushed me over the edge [i.e., to call it torture].

Crawford decided not to prosecute al-Qahtani because his treatment fell within the definition of torture, so evidence was tainted by it having been gained through coercion.

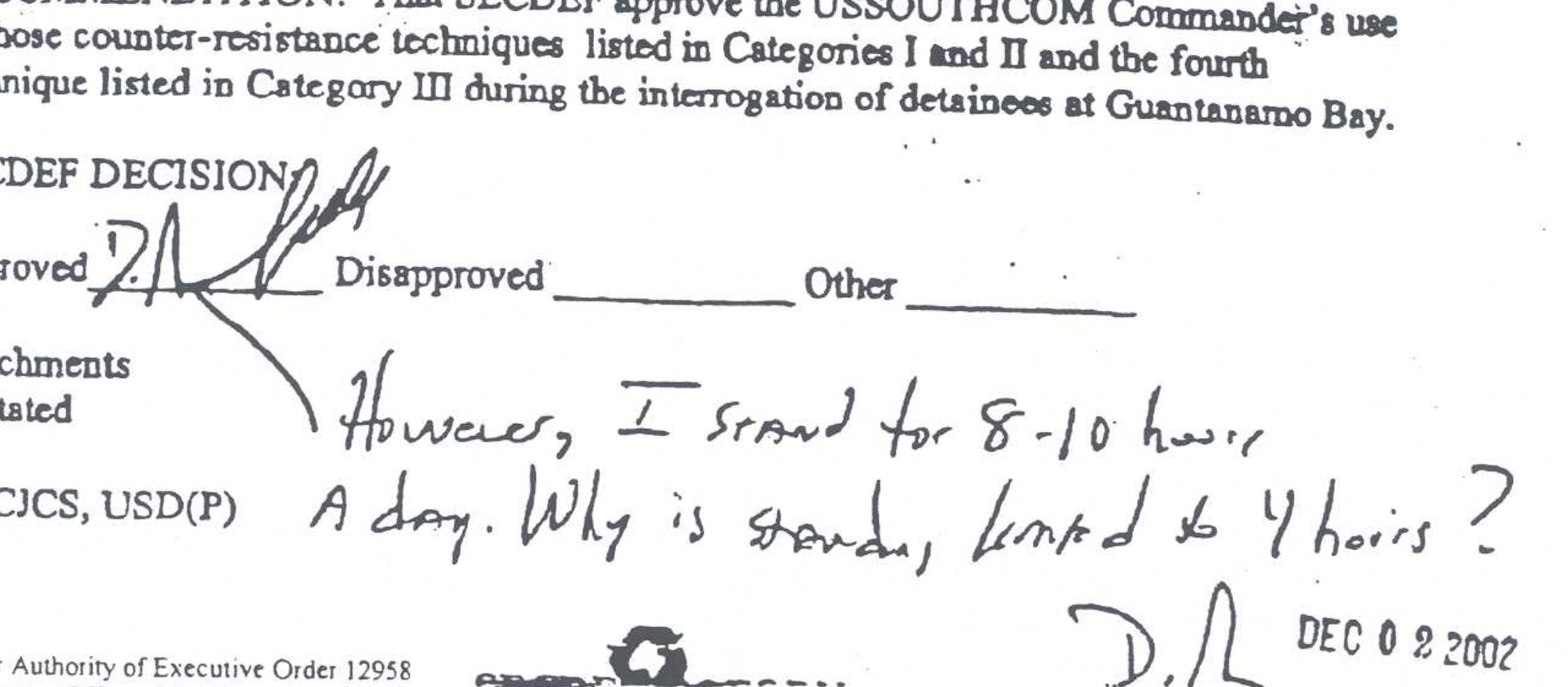
Comment from Donald Rumsfeld: "I stand for 8–10 hours a day. Why is standing [by prisoners] limited to four hours?"

Former President Bush in his published memoirs defends the utility of "enhanced interrogation" techniques and continues to assert that they are not torture. Former President Obama, former Attorney General Holder, and Guantanamo military prosecutor Crawford have called the techniques torture. The British government has determined the techniques would be classified as torture, and dismissed President Bush's claim to the contrary. A report by Human Rights First (HRF) and Physicians for Human Rights (PHR) stated that these techniques constitute torture. "A United Nations report denounced the US abuse of prisoners as tantamount to torture. The UN report called for cessation of the US-termed "enhanced interrogation" techniques, as the UN sees these methods as a form of torture. The UN report also admonishes against secret prisons, the use of which, is considered to amount to torture as well and should be discontinued.

In 2009, Paul Kane of The Washington Post said that the press was hesitant to define these techniques as torture, as it is a crime and nobody who engaged in "enhanced interrogation" has been charged or convicted. In the summer of 2009, NPR decided to ban using the word torture in what was a controversial act. Its Ombudsman Alicia Shepard's defense of the policy was that "calling waterboarding torture is tantamount to taking sides." However, Berkeley Professor of Linguistics, Geoffrey Nunberg, pointed out that virtually all media around the world, other than what he called the "spineless U.S. media", call these techniques torture.

=== Terminology ===
Critics have referred to the term "enhanced interrogation" as a euphemism, calling it Orwellian, in order to disguise the brutal reality of torture by using "unclear language".

=== Effectiveness and reliability ===
==== Senate Intelligence Committee report ====
On December 9, 2014, United States Senate Select Committee on Intelligence (SSCI) released a 525-page document containing the key findings and an executive summary, of their report into the CIA's Detention and Interrogation Program. The remainder of the 6,000-page report remains classified. The report concluded that the interrogation techniques were far more vicious and widespread than the CIA had previously reported; that "brutality, dishonesty and seemingly arbitrary violence at times brought even [CIA] employees to moments of anguish." The report said that CIA officials had deceived their superiors at the White House, members of Congress and even sometimes their peers about how the interrogation program was being run and what it had achieved.

The executive summary lists 20 key findings:

1. The CIA's use of its enhanced interrogation techniques was not an effective means of acquiring intelligence or gaining cooperation from detainees.
2. The CIA's justification for the use of its enhanced interrogation techniques rested on inaccurate claims of their effectiveness.
3. The interrogations of CIA detainees were brutal and far worse than the CIA represented to policymakers and others.
4. The conditions of confinement for CIA detainees were harsher than the CIA had represented to policymakers and others.
5. The CIA repeatedly provided inaccurate information to the Department of Justice, impeding a proper legal analysis of the CIA's Detention and Interrogation Program.
6. The CIA has actively avoided or impeded congressional oversight of the program.
7. The CIA impeded effective White House oversight and decision-making.
8. The CIA's operation and management of the program complicated, and in some cases impeded, the national security missions of other Executive Branch agencies.
9. The CIA impeded oversight by the CIA's Office of Inspector General.
10. The CIA coordinated the release of classified information to the media, including inaccurate information concerning the effectiveness of the CIA's enhanced interrogation techniques.
11. The CIA was unprepared as it began operating its Detention and Interrogation Program more than six months after being granted detention authorities.
12. The CIA's management and operation of its Detention and Interrogation Program was deeply flawed throughout the program's duration, particularly so in 2002 and early 2003.
13. Two contract psychologists devised the CIA's enhanced interrogation techniques and played a central role in the operation, assessments, and management of the CIA's Detention and Interrogation Program. By 2005, the CIA had overwhelmingly outsourced operations related to the program.
14. CIA detainees were subjected to coercive interrogation techniques that had not been approved by the Department of Justice or had not been authorized by CIA Headquarters.
15. The CIA did not conduct a comprehensive or accurate accounting of the number of individuals it detained, and held individuals who did not meet the legal standard for detention. The CIA's claims about the number of detainees held and subjected to its enhanced interrogation techniques were inaccurate.
16. The CIA failed to adequately evaluate the effectiveness of its enhanced interrogation techniques.
17. The CIA rarely reprimanded or held personnel accountable for serious or significant violations, inappropriate activities, and systematic and individual management failures.
18. The CIA marginalized and ignored numerous internal critiques, criticisms, and objections concerning the operation and management of the CIA's Detention and Interrogation Program.
19. The CIA's Detention and Interrogation Program was inherently unsustainable and had effectively ended by 2006 due to unauthorized press disclosures, reduced cooperation from other nations, and legal and oversight concerns.
20. The CIA's Detention and Interrogation Program damaged the United States' standing in the world, and resulted in other significant monetary and non-monetary costs.

The Senate Report examined in detail specifically whether torture provided information helpful in locating Osama Bin Laden, and concluded that it did not, and that the CIA deliberately misled political leaders and the public in saying it had.

The three former CIA directors George Tenet, Porter Goss, and Michael Hayden, who had supervised the program during their tenure, objected to the Senate Report in a Wall Street Journal op-ed piece, calling it poorly done and partisan. They insisted that some information derived from the CIA program was useful, specifically that interrogation techniques made some detainees compliant and that the "information provided by the totality of detainees in CIA custody" had led to Osama Bin Laden. According to the CIA, enhanced interrogation "conditions" were used for security and "other valid reasons, such as to create an environment conducive to transitioning captured and resistant terrorist (sic) to detainees participating in debriefings."

Republican Senator John McCain, citing Obama Administration CIA director Leon Panetta (who did not join with the others in the Wall Street Journal Op-ed) had previously said that brutality produced no useful information in the hunt for Osama Bin Laden; leads were "obtained through standard, noncoercive means". In May 2011, Panetta had written to Senator McCain, that:

we first learned about the facilitator/courier's nom de guerre from a detainee not in CIA custody in 2002. It is also important to note that some detainees who were subjected to enhanced interrogation techniques attempted to provide false or misleading information about the facilitator/courier. These attempts to falsify the facilitator/courier's role were alerting. In the end, no detainee in CIA custody revealed the facilitator/courier's full true name or specific whereabouts. This information was discovered through other intelligence means.

In 2014, Panetta wrote that torture did produce some useful information, but that the product was not worth the price, and if asked whether America should engage in similar practices he would say "no". Obama Administration CIA director John Brennan said that it is "unknowable" whether brutality helped or hindered in the collection of useful intelligence. White House Press Secretary Josh Earnest said whether information derived from CIA torture may have helped find Osama Bin Laden, President Obama believes "the use of these techniques was not worth it because of the harm that was done to our national values and the sense of what we believe in as Americans." Similarly, Republican McCain agreed with Democrat Dianne Feinstein in remarks on the Senate floor that torture "stained our national honor" and did "much harm and little practical good".

==== Internal CIA assessments of efficacy ====
A classified internal review prepared by the Central Intelligence Agency Office of Inspector General in 2004.

===== Panetta Review =====
The Panetta Review was a review begun in 2009 by the CIA that examined the use of torture during interrogations of detainees. The review was described as "particularly scorching ... of extreme interrogation methods like waterboarding, which the memos described as providing little intelligence of any value."

===== 2015 review =====
On request by the National Security Advisor Susan Rice in 2015, the CIA compiled a summary of key intelligence, which according to their records had been collected after the application of (unspecified) interrogation techniques. The memorandum lists intelligence related to the following topics: The Karachi Plot, The Heathrow Plot, The "Second Wave", The Guraba Cell, Issa al-Hindi, Abu Talha al-Pakistani, Hambali's Capture, Jafaar al-Tayyar, Dirty Bomb Plot, Shoe bomber, and Sh(a)kai (Pakistan). The CIA concluded that the enhanced interrogation techniques had been effective in providing intelligence and has been a key reason why al-Qa'ida has failed to launch a spectacular attack in the West since September 11, 2001.

=== Destruction of videotapes ===
In December 2007 it became known that the CIA had destroyed many videotapes recording the interrogation of prisoners. Disclosures in 2010 revealed that Jose Rodriguez Jr., head of the directorate of operations at the CIA from 2004 to 2007, ordered the tapes destroyed because he thought they would be "devastating to the CIA", and that "the heat from destroying [the videotapes] is nothing compared to what it would be if the tapes ever got into public domain." The New York Times reported that according to "some insiders", an inquiry into the C.I.A.'s secret detention program which analyzed these techniques, "might end with criminal charges for abusive interrogations." In an op-ed for The New York Times, Thomas H. Kean and Lee H. Hamilton, chair and vice chair of the 9/11 Commission, stated:

As a legal matter, it is not up to us to examine the C.I.A.'s failure to disclose the existence of these tapes. That is for others. What we do know is that government officials decided not to inform a lawfully constituted body, created by Congress and the president, to investigate one (of) the greatest tragedies to confront this country. We call that obstruction.

Responding to the "torture memoranda", Scott Horton said:

the possibility that the authors of these memoranda counseled the use of lethal and unlawful techniques, and therefore face criminal culpability themselves. That, after all, is the teaching of United States v. Altstötter, the Nuremberg case brought against German Justice Department lawyers whose memoranda crafted the basis for implementation of the infamous "Night and Fog Decree".

Jordan Paust concurred by responding to Mukasey's refusal to investigate and/or prosecute anyone that relied on these legal opinions:

it is legally and morally impossible for any member of the executive branch to be acting lawfully or within the scope of his or her authority while following OLC opinions that are manifestly inconsistent with or violative of the law. General Mukasey, just following orders is no defense!

=== International Committee of the Red Cross report ===
On March 15, 2009, Mark Danner provided a report in the New York Review of Books (with an abridged version in The New York Times) describing and commenting on the contents of a report by the International Committee of the Red Cross (ICRC), Report on the Treatment of Fourteen "High Value Detainees" in CIA Custody (43 pp., February 2007). Report ... is a record of interviews with black site detainees, conducted between October 6 and 11 and December 4 and 14, 2006, after their transfer to Guantánamo. (According to Danner, the report was marked "confidential" and was not previously made public before being made available to him.)

Danner provides excerpts of interviews with detainees, including Abu Zubaydah, Walid bin Attash, and Khalid Sheikh Mohammed. According to Danner, the report contains sections on "methods of ill-treatment" including suffocation by water, prolonged stress standing, beatings by use of a collar, beating and kicking, confinement in a box, prolonged nudity, sleep deprivation and use of loud music, exposure to cold temperature/cold water, prolonged use of handcuffs and shackles, threats, forced shaving, and deprivation/restricted provision of solid food. Danner quotes the ICRC report as saying that, "in many cases, the ill-treatment to which they were subjected while held in the CIA program, either singly or in combination, constituted torture. In addition, many other elements of the ill-treatment, either singly or in combination, constituted cruel, inhuman or degrading treatment."

A heavily redacted version of the November 8, 2006 meeting was released by the CIA on June 10, 2016. The report tells that the ICRC finds the detainees stories "largely credible, having put much stock in the fact that the story each detainee told about his transfer, treatment and conditions of confinement was basically consistent, even though they had been incommunicado with each other throughout their detention by us [the CIA]."

=== Senate Armed Services Committee report ===
INQUIRY INTO THE TREATMENT OF DETAINEES IN U.S. CUSTODY

A bipartisan Senate Armed Services Committee report, released in part in December 2008 and in full in April 2009, concluded that the legal authorization of "enhanced interrogation techniques" led directly to the abuse and killings of prisoners in US military facilities at Abu Ghraib, Bagram, and elsewhere. Brutal abuse migrated from Guantanamo Bay to Afghanistan, then to Iraq and Abu Ghraib. The report concludes that some authorized techniques including "use of stress positions and sleep deprivation combined with other mistreatment" caused or were direct contributing factors in the cases of several prisoners who were tortured to death. The report also notes that authorizing abuse created the conditions for other, unauthorized abuse, by creating a legal and moral climate encouraging inhumane treatment. The legal memos condoning "enhanced interrogation" had "redefined torture", "distorted the meaning and intent of anti-torture laws, [and] rationalized the abuse of detainees", conveying the message that "physical pressures and degradation were appropriate treatment." What followed was an "erosion of standards dictating that detainees be treated humanely." The report accused US Secretary of Defense Rumsfeld and his deputies of being, according to The Washington Post, directly responsible as the "authors and chief promoters of harsh interrogation policies that disgraced the nation and undermined US security."

=== Comparison to the Gestapo interrogation method called "Verschärfte Vernehmung" ===
Atlantic Monthly writer Andrew Sullivan has pointed out similarities between the Gestapo interrogation method called "Verschärfte Vernehmung" and what the US called "enhanced interrogation". He asserts the first use of a term comparable to "enhanced interrogation" was a 1937 memo by Gestapo Chief Heinrich Müller coining the phrase "Verschärfte Vernehmung", German for "sharpened questioning", "intensified" or "enhanced interrogation" to describe subjection to extreme cold, sleep deprivation, suspension in stress positions, and deliberate exhaustion among other techniques. Sullivan reports that in 1948, Norway prosecuted German officials for what trial documents termed "Verschärfte Vernehmung" including subjection to cold water, and repeated beatings. Sullivan concludes:

The very phrase used by the president to describe torture-that-isn't-somehow-torture – "enhanced interrogation techniques" – is a term originally coined by the Nazis. The techniques are indistinguishable. The methods were clearly understood in 1948 as war-crimes. The punishment for them was death.

=== Effect on United States reputation ===
Historian Arthur M. Schlesinger Jr. in assessing the effect of the Bush torture program on the reputation of the United States in the world, stated that the damage to US reputation had been incalculable, "No position taken has done more damage to the American reputation in the world – ever."

== Investigation and calls for prosecution ==
=== Request for special counsel probe ===
On June 8, 2008, fifty-six House Democrats asked for an independent investigation, raising the possibility that authorising these techniques may constitute a crime by Bush administration officials. The congressmen involved in calling for such an investigation included John Conyers, Jan Schakowsky, and Jerrold Nadler. The letter was addressed to Attorney General Michael B. Mukasey, who said:

information indicates that the Bush administration may have systematically implemented, from the top down, detainee interrogation policies that constitute torture or otherwise violate the law. ... Because these apparent 'enhanced interrogation techniques' were used under cover of Justice Department legal opinions, the need for an outside special prosecutor is obvious.

According to The Washington Post the request was denied because Attorney General Michael B. Mukasey felt that "officials acted in 'good faith' when they sought legal opinions, and that the lawyers who provided them used their best judgment." The article also reported that "[h]e warned that criminalizing the process could cause policymakers to second-guess themselves and 'harm our national security well into the future.'" After Cheney acknowledged his involvement in authorising these tactics, Senator Carl Levin, chair of the Armed Services Committee, a New York Times editorial, Glenn Greenwald and Scott Horton stressed the importance of a criminal investigation: "A prosecutor should be appointed to consider criminal charges against top officials at the Pentagon and others involved in planning the abuse."

=== United Nations Convention Against Torture ===
Shortly before the end of Bush's second term, news media in other countries were opining that under the United Nations Convention Against Torture, the US is obligated to hold those responsible to account under criminal law. On January 20, 2009, the United Nations special rapporteur on Torture, Professor Manfred Nowak, remarked on German television that – following the inauguration of President Barack Obama – George W. Bush no longer had head of state immunity, and that under international law, the US is mandated to start criminal proceedings against all those involved in these violations of the UN Convention Against Torture. Law professor Dietmar Herz explained Nowak's comments by saying that under US and international law former President Bush is criminally responsible for adopting torture as an interrogation tool.

=== Binyam Mohamed case ===
On February 4, 2009, the High Court of England and Wales ruled that evidence of possible torture in the case of Binyam Mohamed, an Ethiopian-born British resident who was held in Guantanamo Bay until 2009, could not be disclosed to the public:

as a result of a statement by David Miliband, the Foreign Secretary, that if the evidence was disclosed the US would stop sharing intelligence with Britain. That would directly threaten the UK's national security, Miliband had told the court.

The judges said they found it "difficult to conceive" the rationale for the US's objections to releasing the information, which contained "no disclosure of sensitive intelligence matters". Adding, "we did not consider that a democracy governed by the rule of law would expect a court in another democracy to suppress a summary of the evidence contained in reports by its own officials". Responding to the ruling, David Davis, the Conservative MP and former Shadow Home Secretary, commented:

The ruling implies that torture has taken place in the [Binyam] Mohamed case, that British agencies may have been complicit, and further, that the United States government has threatened our high court that if it releases this information the US government will withdraw its intelligence cooperation with the United Kingdom.

The High Court judges also stated in 2009, that a criminal investigation, by the UK's Attorney General, into possible torture had begun. In February 2010, the UK Court of Appeal ruled that material held by the UK Foreign Secretary must be made public. The judges also concluded that Binyam Mohamed had been subjected to "cruel, inhuman and degrading treatment by the United States authorities" and that British Intelligence knew that Mohamed was being tortured by the CIA.

== Legality ==
Historian Arthur M. Schlesinger Jr. considered the US torture policy "the most dramatic, sustained, and radical challenge to the rule of law in American history." After the disclosure of the use of the techniques, debates arose over the legality of the techniques—whether they had violated US or international law.

=== U.S. government ===
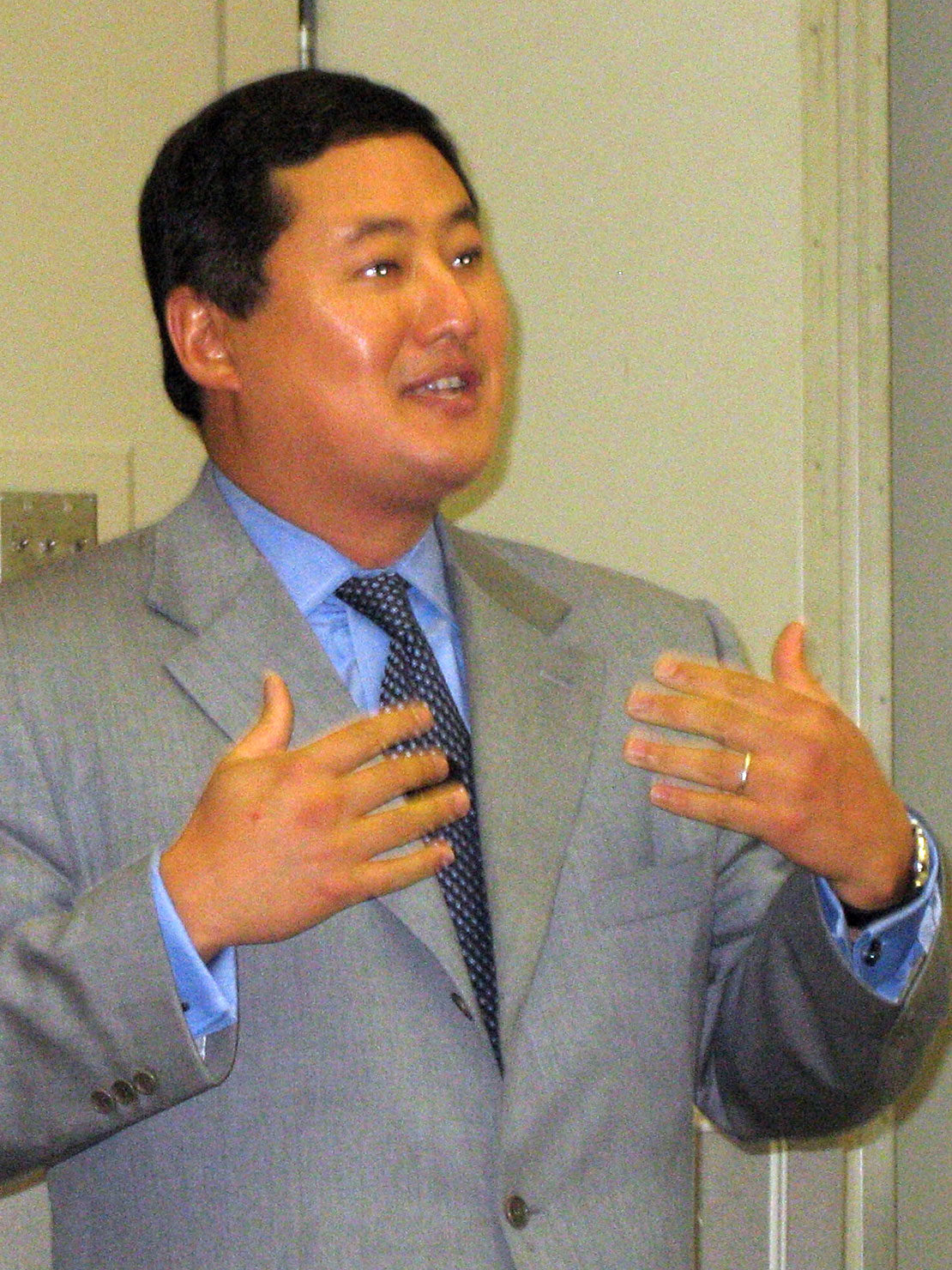
John Yoo, author of the "torture memos"

Following the September 11 attacks in 2001, several memoranda analyzing the legality of various interrogation methods were written by John Yoo from the Office of Legal Counsel. The memos, known today as the torture memos, advocate enhanced interrogation techniques, while pointing out that avoiding the Geneva Conventions would reduce the possibility of prosecution under the US War Crimes Act of 1996 for actions taken in the war on terror. In addition, a new US definition of torture was issued. Most actions that fall under the international definition do not fall within this new definition advocated by the U.S.

The Bush administration told the CIA in 2002 that its interrogators working abroad would not violate US prohibitions against torture unless they "have the specific intent to inflict severe pain or suffering", according to a previously secret US Justice Department memo released on July 24, 2008. The interrogator's "good faith" and "honest belief" that the interrogation will not cause such suffering protects the interrogator, the memo adds. "Because specific intent is an element of the offense, the absence of specific intent negates the charge of torture", Jay Bybee, then the Assistant Attorney General, wrote in the memo, dated August 1, 2002, addressed to the CIA acting General Counsel John A. Rizzo. The initial release of 18-page memo was heavily redacted, with 10 of its 18 pages completely blacked out and only a few paragraphs visible on the others.

Another memo released on the same day advises that "the waterboard", does "not violate the Torture Statute." It also cites a number of warnings against torture, including statements by President Bush and a then-new Supreme Court ruling, which "raises possible concerns about future US judicial review of the [interrogation] Program." A third memo instructs interrogators to keep records of sessions in which "enhanced interrogation techniques" are used. The memo is signed by then-CIA director George Tenet and dated January 28, 2003. The memos were made public by the American Civil Liberties Union, which obtained the three CIA-related documents under Freedom of Information Act requests. They were among nearly 140,000 formerly classified documents from the Department of Defense, the Justice Department, and the CIA that provide details on the treatment of prisoners in US custody in the "war on terror" gathered by the ACLU.

A less redacted version of the August 1, 2002, memo signed by Assistant Attorney General Jay Bybee (regarding Abu Zubaydah) and four memos from 2005 signed by Principal Deputy Assistant Attorney General Steven G. Bradbury addressed to CIA and analysing the legality of various specific interrogation methods, including waterboarding, were released by Barack Obama's administration on April 16, 2009. Following the release of the CIA documents, Philip Zelikow, a former State Department lawyer and adviser to then-Secretary of State Condoleezza Rice, said that in 2005, he had written a legal memo objecting to torture. In it he argued that it was unlikely that "any federal court would agree (that the approval of harsh interrogation techniques) ... was a reasonable interpretation of the Constitution." He claimed that the Bush Administration had ordered all copies of his legal memo be collected and destroyed.

==== Subsequent torture memoranda ====
In May 2005, in response to requests from the CIA, Bradbury authored several memoranda that confirmed that several so-called "enhanced interrogation techniques" did not constitute torture, including waterboarding, walling, stress positions, striking a prisoner, exposure to extreme temperatures, dousing with cold water, and forced sleep deprivation of up to 180 hours (7 1/2 days), even when used in combination. These memoranda found the CIA's practices to be lawful if applied in accordance with specified conditions, limitations, and safeguards, including those set forth in the agency's interrogation procedures. Bradbury's memoranda were described by Democrats as an attempt to sidestep anti-torture laws and subvert a 2004 public Justice Department legal opinion characterizing torture as "abhorrent". These memoranda were publicly released by the Obama Administration on April 16, 2009.

Bradbury authored an additional memo dated July 2007, seeking to reconcile the interrogation techniques with new developments, including intervening legislation such as the Military Commissions Act of 2006 and the December 2005 Detainee Treatment Act. In response to this and other new legislation, the 2007 memo provided legal authorization and OLC approval for a more limited set of actions for use when interrogating high-value detainees. This approval encompassed six listed techniques, including temporary food deprivation of no less than 1,000 calories (4,200 kJ) per day, sleep deprivation by being forced to hold a "standing position for as many as four days", and several types of physical striking. The cumulative effect of Bush administration legal memos and exemption from prosecution had been to create a "law free zone" according to the former chief prosecutor at Guantánamo, where civilian politicians expected the military to use torture "against our will and judgment".

=== International legal bodies ===
On May 19, 2006, the UN Committee against Torture issued a report stating the US should stop secretly detaining, torturing, and ill-treating terror suspects, since such treatment is illegal under international law. In July 2014, the European Court of Human Rights condemned the government of Poland for participating in CIA extraordinary rendition to a black site in Poland for enhanced interrogation, which the court called "torture, inhumane and degrading treatment". The court ordered the government of Poland to pay restitution to men who had been tortured there.

=== Human rights organizations ===
A report by Human Rights First (HRF) and Physicians for Human Rights (PHR) stated that these techniques constitute torture. Their press release said:

The report concludes that each of the ten tactics is likely to violate U.S. laws, including the War Crimes Act, the U.S. Torture Act, and the Detainee Treatment Act of 2005.

The Constitution Project convened a review of interrogation and detention programs in the years after the September 11, 2001 terrorist attacks. It concluded in 2013 that "it is indisputable that the United States engaged in the practice of torture" and that the nation's highest officials bore ultimate responsibility for it.

== Ban on interrogation techniques ==
On December 14, 2005, the Detainee Treatment Act was passed into law, setting the Army policy as standard for all agencies and prohibiting "cruel, inhuman, or degrading treatment or punishment". On February 13, 2008, in a 51 to 45 vote, the Senate approved a bill clarifying this language, allowing only "those interrogation techniques explicitly authorized by the 2006 Army Field Manual." The Washington Post stated:

The measure would effectively ban the use of simulated drowning, temperature extremes and other harsh tactics that the CIA used on al-Qaeda prisoners after the September 11, 2001, attacks.

President George W. Bush has said in a BBC interview he would veto such a bill after previously signing an executive order that allows "enhanced interrogation techniques" and may exempt the CIA from Common Article 3 of the Geneva Conventions. On March 8, 2008, President Bush vetoed this bill.

"Because the danger remains, we need to ensure our intelligence officials have all the tools they need to stop the terrorists", Bush said in his weekly radio address. "The bill Congress sent me would take away one of the most valuable tools in the war on terror – the CIA program to detain and question key terrorist leaders and operatives." Bush said that the methods used by the military are designed for interrogating "lawful combatants captured on the battlefield", not the "hardened terrorists" normally questioned by the CIA. "If we were to shut down this program and restrict the CIA to methods in the Field Manual, we could lose vital information from senior al Qaida terrorists, and that could cost American lives", Bush said.

Massachusetts senator Ted Kennedy described Bush's veto as "one of the most shameful acts of his presidency". He said, "Unless Congress overrides the veto, it will go down in history as a flagrant insult to the rule of law and a serious stain on the good name of America in the eyes of the world." According to Jane Mayer, during the transition period for then President-elect Barack Obama, his legal, intelligence, and national-security advisers had met at the CIA's headquarters in Langley to discuss "whether a ban on brutal interrogation practices would hurt their ability to gather intelligence", and among the consulted experts: "There was unanimity among Obama's expert advisers ... that to change the practices would not in any material way affect the collection of intelligence." On January 22, 2009, President Obama signed Executive Order 13491 requiring the CIA to use only the 19 interrogation methods outlined in the United States Army Field Manual on interrogations "unless the Attorney General with appropriate consultation provides further guidance."

== Decision not to prosecute ==
Both US and international law state that if a country is unwilling or unable to prosecute its own officials for torture, an international tribunal may do so. For instance, under the principle of aut dedere aut judicare, parties to the United Nations Convention against Torture are obligated to either prosecute the accused parties, or extradite them to a state that will.

The United Nations' Special Rapporteur on Torture, Human Rights Watch, and American legal scholars have called for the prosecution of Bush administration officials who ordered torture, conspired to provide legal cover for torture, and CIA and DoD personnel and contract workers who carried it out. John Yoo, the former Bush administration attorney who authored the Torture Memos, has said that CIA officers risk prosecution for acts outside what the Justice Department specifically authorized. A dozen lower-ranking Defense Department personnel were prosecuted for abuses at Abu Ghraib; one CIA contractor who beat Abdul Wali to death in Afghanistan was convicted of felony assault; however, neither US domestic nor international prosecution of high-ranking officials is likely.

=== US domestic prosecution refused ===
President Obama, while condemning torture, ruled out prosecuting his Bush administration predecessors. According to University of California Law School Dean Christopher Edley Jr., who served on President Obama's transition team, the decision not to prosecute predated Obama's taking office and was due to concern about a backlash by leaders of the military, the National Security Agency and the CIA. In an interview, Ben Rhodes, Deputy National Security Advisor under Obama, commented on the difficult political problems that torture prosecutions would have created, both in distracting from the administration's response to the Great Recession and potentially alienating the president from his own agencies. Legal analysts such as Eric Posner and Andrew Napolitano have said that prosecutions would create a precedent putting Obama administration officials at risk of politically motivated prosecutions by their successors.

The US Department of Justice announced that there will be no trials even of those who went well beyond what the Torture Memos allowed, including those who tortured detainees to death. The rationale has not been disclosed. In response to a FOIA lawsuit, the Obama administration argued that the rationale should be kept secret because "disclosing them could affect the candor of law enforcement deliberations about whether to bring criminal charges."

=== Foreign prosecution ===
There is no statute of limitations for war crimes in international law. However, prosecutions in either the International Criminal Court, or in the courts of a particular nation invoking the doctrine of universal jurisdiction, are also regarded as unlikely. The US under the Bush administration "unsigned" the treaty that had conferred on the International Criminal Court jurisdiction over Americans. In addition, President Bush signed the 2002 American Service-Members' Protection Act allowing military invasion of The Hague to rescue any Americans the court might detain for war crimes trials. Some torture occurred in CIA black site prisons in countries that remain parties to the treaty, like Poland, Afghanistan, Lithuania, and Romania. But for political reasons those countries are not in a position to initiate a prosecution, nor to extradite US officials to face charges.

Invoking the universal jurisdiction doctrine, the Center for Constitutional Rights tried first in Switzerland and then in Canada to prosecute former President George Bush, on behalf of four tortured detainees. Bush cancelled his trip to Switzerland after news of the potential warrant came to light. Bush has traveled to Canada, but the Canadian government shut down the prosecution in advance of his arrest. The Center filed a grievance with the United Nations for Canada's failure to enforce the Convention Against Torture, which was dismissed on December 2, 2015 on the grounds that it was inadmissible.

=== Consequence of failing to prosecute ===
Without any prosecutions the possibility remains that a future presidential administration could claim torture is legal and revive its practice. In February 2016, several leading US presidential candidates openly argued for reintroducing torture, including President Donald Trump who expressed his desire to bring back waterboarding. The US reluctance to punish torturers has set back the fight against torture worldwide, according to Juan E. Méndez, the United Nations' special rapporteur on torture.

== Prosecution of John Kiriakou ==
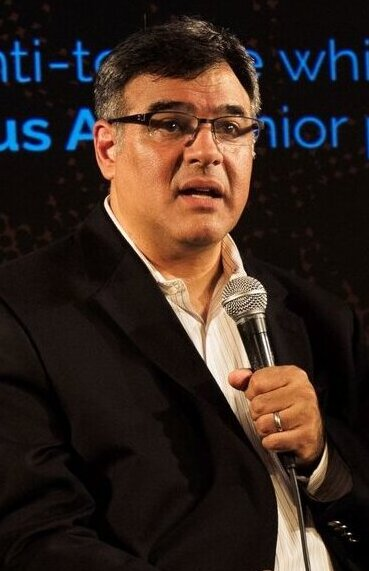
CIA whistleblower John Kiriakou

Former CIA officer John Kiriakou in 2007 was the first official within the US government to confirm the use of waterboarding of al-Qaeda prisoners as an interrogation technique, which he described as torture. On October 22, 2012, Kiriakou pleaded guilty to disclosing classified information about a fellow CIA officer that connected the covert operative to a specific operation. He was sentenced to 30 months in prison on January 25, 2013. Kiriakou was the only person to be prosecuted in relation to the Enhanced Interrogation Program.

== European Court of Human Rights decisions ==
On July 24, 2014, the European Court of Human Rights ruled that Poland violated the European Convention on Human Rights when it cooperated with the US, allowing the CIA to hold and torture Abu Zubaydah and Abd al-Rahim al-Nashiri on its territory in 2002–2003. The court ordered the Polish government to pay each of the men 100,000 euros in damages. It also awarded Abu Zubaydah 30,000 euros to cover his costs. On May 31, 2018, the ECHR ruled that Romania and Lithuania also violated the rights of Abu Zubaydah and Abd al-Rahim al-Nashiri in 2003–2005 and in 2005–2006 respectively, and Lithuania and Romania were ordered to pay 100,000 euros in damages each to Abu Zubaydah and Abd al-Nashiri.

== See also ==
- Bagram torture and prisoner abuse
- Behavioral Science Consultation Team
- Brainwashing
- Bush Six
- CIA black sites
- Black site
- Command responsibility
- Criticism of the war on terror
- Doublespeak
- Extraordinary rendition
- Five techniques
- Gitmo playlist
- High-Value Interrogation Group
- Iraq prison abuse scandals
- Kuala Lumpur War Crimes Commission
- Law of war
- Panetta Review
- Senate Intelligence Committee report on CIA torture
- Torture and the United States
- War crime
- Subpoena ad testificandum
- The Report (2019 film)
