= Paul Rester =

Paul Rester is the director of the Joint Intelligence Group at the United States' Guantanamo Bay detention camps, in Cuba—the Chief Interrogator.

Rester described the interrogation techniques the military used at Guantanamo to the Associated Press. He said he was concerned that the CIA's use of "extended interrogation techniques" had given the public the wrong impression of the techniques the military used at Guantanamo.

Everybody in the world believes that they know how we do what we do, and I have to endure it every time I turn around and somebody is making reference to waterboarding.

Rester told Andrew Selsky of the Associated Press that the successes of the American military interrogators had come through "rapport-building" techniques—not coercive or brutal techniques. He said Joint Task Force Guantanamo commander Mark Buzby had authorized him to describe one of the interrogators recent successes.

For security reasons, he would only discuss one of the successes, and that was only because his boss, Rear Adm. Mark Buzby, already had described it in a speech last month. Buzby said several detainees, using poster board paper and crayons, drew detailed maps of the Tora Bora area in eastern Afghanistan that enabled coalition forces to wipe out safe houses, trenches and supplies last summer as Taliban forces were returning to the stronghold they had abandoned more than five years ago.

Rester acknowledged that Mohammed al Qahtani, and one other captive, had been subjected to rougher treatment in 2002. He didn't offer the name of the other captive who had been subjected to rougher treatment.

Time Magazine reported that Mohammed al Qahtani's interrogation log had been leaked to them, and that it documented he had been subjected to almost two months of sleep deprivation, forced nudity, force-feedings, forced enemas, threats against his family, and sexual humiliation.

According to Selsky's article Joshua Colangelo-Bryan, a lawyer who volunteered to help Guantanamo captives "scoffed at Rester's contention that rough treatment at Guantanamo was restricted to just two men."

There are so many accounts by FBI agents ... and others who personally saw non-rapport-building techniques that Rester's statement is just not credible.

Following the United States Supreme Court's ruling in Hamdan v. Rumsfeld Rester stated:

Nobody wants to be the first person to allow the next 9/11 to happen. Emptying this place is not my goal.
