= Robert Eatinger =

American lawyer

Robert Joseph Eatinger, Jr.
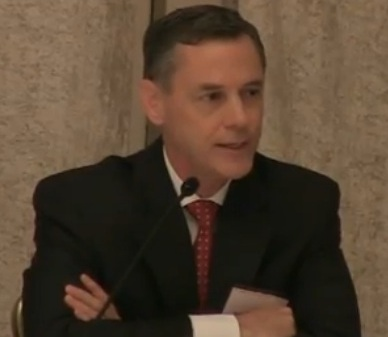

General Counsel of the Central Intelligence Agency
- Acting
- In office October 25, 2013 – March 13, 2014
- President: Barack Obama
- Preceded by: Stephen W. Preston
- Succeeded by: Caroline Krass

Personal details
- Born: October 1, 1957 (age 69) Oak Park, Illinois
- Education: California State University, San Bernardino (B.A., political science); University of San Diego School of Law (J.D.)
- Occupation: Lawyer
- Known for: Being publicly accused of criminal behavior by Senator Dianne Feinstein on 11 March 2014

Robert Joseph "Bob" Eatinger (born October 1, 1957) was Deputy General Counsel for Operations for the Central Intelligence Agency, serving as Acting General Counsel of the CIA from 2009 to March 2014. He has served as a lawyer in various capacities, in the CIA and Navy during the U.S. war on terror, during which the CIA held dozens of detainees in black site prisons around the globe.

Eatinger's name came into the public eye on 11 March 2014, when he was mentioned by title (not name) in the speech by Senator Dianne Feinstein related to her accusations of criminal spying behavior, and Constitutional "separation of powers" violations by the CIA.

Feinstein stated that Eatinger's name was mentioned "over 1,600 times" in the classified torture report produced by the SSCI.

== Early life and education ==
The oldest son of Robert and Patricia, Eatinger was raised in an Air Force family which moved many times. After graduating from San Gorgonio High School and California State University, San Bernardino, Eatinger earned a J.D. degree from the University of San Diego.

== U.S. Government service as military-intelligence lawyer (1984-present) ==
=== Service in U.S. Navy (1984 - 1988) ===
Eatinger began his career in 1983 in the Naval Justice School, where at various times he served as Trial Counsel and Legal Assistance Attorney, and Senior Defense Counsel in the Naval Legal Service Office and Naval Air Station in Corpus Christi Texas.

In 1984, he was hired as a Litigation Attorney in the Office of the Judge Advocate General (10/1984-09/1988). In this capacity he served concurrently in the Office of General Counsel, and as in the Special Operations Attorney, Special Programs Office of the Navy.

=== Service in NSA (1988-1996) ===
For two years, between 1988 and 1991 he served at the National Security Agency/Central Security Service, while continuing his role in the Navy as a reservist, where he held the positions of Assistant Legal Counsel, Navy Reserve Navy Personnel Command (10/1993-09/1996); Special Operations Attorney, Special Programs Department, Navy Reserve Civil Law Support Activity 106 as a Naval reservist.

=== Service in CIA (1995 - present) ===
Eatinger began at the CIA in 1995, working as an Operations Attorney. In 1997, he moved to become Deputy Chief of Litigation, in 1999, he was promoted to Chief of Litigation, where he served until 2004.

Between 2004 and 2009 Eatiner served as General Counsel to the Senior Counter-terrorism Counsel. Between 2009 and 2013, Eatiner served as Deputy General Counsel for Operations, becoming Senior Deputy General Counsel as-from June 2013.

In this capacity, he has served as CIA Acting General Counsel, since 2009.

=== U.S. Naval Reserve service while at NSA and CIA (1997-2012) ===
Eatinger continued his naval officer status while serving at the NSA and CIA, i.e. while serving at the NSA and CIA, he retained status as a Navy Reservist, serving, concurrently in the Naval Special Operations Attorney and National Security Litigation Division Department Head, Navy Reserve Administrative Law (between 12/2009-11/2012), serving as Commanding Officer, Navy Reserve Civil Litigation (between 12/2007- serving as Deputy Legal Counsel, Office of the Legal Counsel, Office of the Chairman Joint Chiefs of Staff, Navy Reserve General IMA Detachment DC (10/2004-11/2007); serving as Commanding Officer, Navy Reserve Civil Law Support Activity 106, (between 10/2002-09/2004); serving as Special Operations Attorney and Special Programs Division Department Head, Navy Reserve Civil Law Support Activity 106 (between 05/2001-09/2002); serving as Staff Judge Advocate and Mobilization Officer, Naval Reserve Center, Washington, DC (between 03/2000-05/2001); also serving as Assistant Fleet Judge Advocate, Navy Reserve Commander in Chief, U.S. Atlantic Fleet JAG Detachment 106 (10/1996-03/2000);

== Destruction of CIA interrogation tapes ==
In June 2004, Eatinger attended a meeting at the White House with Alberto Gonzales, David Addington, John Bellinger, and Scott Muller discussing what to do with tapes the CIA had made of harsh interrogations. In 2005, tapes related to interrogations carried out at a black interrogation center in Thailand were destroyed by the CIA. Mr. Jose Rodriguez, former CIA clandestine branch chief, who ordered the destruction of the tapes, has said through his attorney that he based his decision on legal advice from CIA lawyers Steven Hermes and Robert Eatinger. The information received from Hermes and Eatinger did not explicitly endorse the tape destruction, but claimed there was "no legal impediment" to disposing of them.

== 2014 CIA-SSCI dispute ==
On 11 March 2014, Senator Feinstein gave a speech on the floor of the Senate, addressing Eatinger by title, not by name. In the speech Feinstein said that the CIA had launched two investigations of SSCI staff involved in analysis of the Panetta review, while SSCI staff were producing a document addressing CIA torture activities in which Eatinger himself was involved. Feinstein said the two investigations, launched at the behest of Eatinger, amounted to an attempt at "intimidation". Feinstein stated that,

There is no legitimate reason to allege to the Justice Department that Senate staff may have committed a crime. I view the acting general counsel's referral as a potential effort to intimidate this staff—and I am not taking it lightly.

I should note that for most, if not all, of the CIA's Detention and Interrogation Program, the now acting general counsel was a lawyer in the CIA's Counterterrorism Center—the unit within which the CIA managed and carried out this program.

From mid-2004 until the official termination of the detention and interrogation program in January 2009, he was the unit's chief lawyer. He is mentioned by name more than 1,600 times in our study.

== See also ==
- 2005 CIA interrogation tapes destruction
- Torture memos
- Torture in the United States
