= Abu Zubaydah =

Saudi Arabian Guantanamo detainee (born 1971)

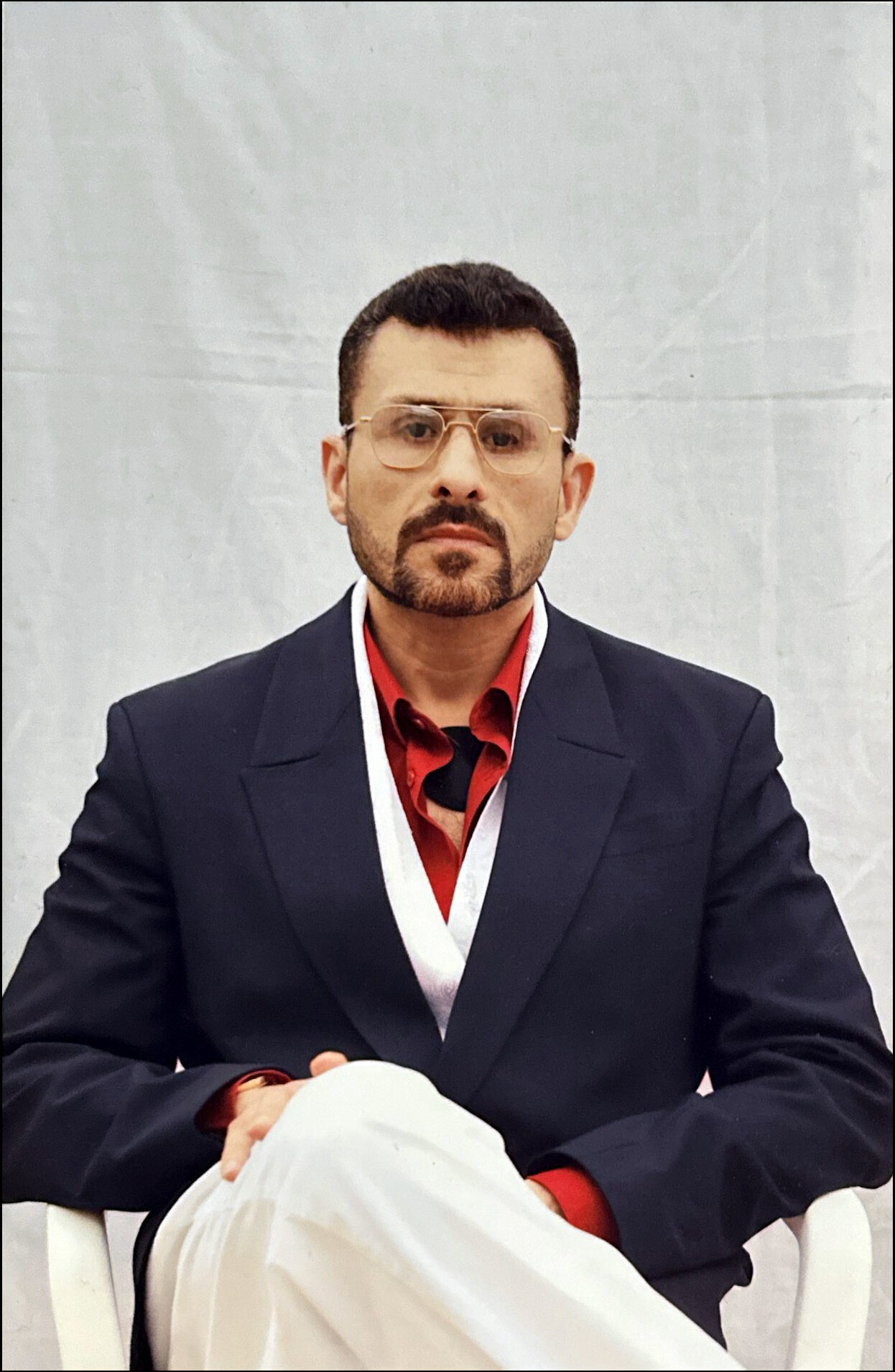
- Abu Zubaydah in Guantanamo, June 2024
- Born: Zayn al-Abidin Muhammad Husayn; March 12, 1971 (age 55); Riyadh, Saudi Arabia
- Arrested: March 2002; Faisalabad, Pakistan
- Detained at: CIA black sites, Guantanamo
- ISN: 10016
- Charge: Uncharged
- Status: Currently detained

Abu Zubaydah (/ˈɑːbuː zʊˈbeɪdə/ AH-boo zuu-BAY-də; Arabic: ابو زبيدة, romanized: Abū Zubāydāh, lit. 'Father of Jewels'; born March 12, 1971, as Zayn al-Abidin Muhammad Husayn) is a Palestinian captive born in Saudi Arabia currently held by the U.S. in the Guantanamo Bay detention camp in Cuba. He is held under the authority of Authorization for Use of Military Force Against Terrorists (AUMF). The United States government has never officially charged him with any crime.

Believed to be a high-ranking Al-Qaeda member, Abu Zubaydah was captured in Pakistan in March 2002 and has been in United States custody ever since, including 4 1/2 years in the secret prison network of the Central Intelligence Agency (CIA). He was transferred among prisons in various countries, including a year in Poland, as part of a United States extraordinary rendition program. In 2004, media coverage of Abu Zubaydah began referring to him as a "disappeared" prisoner, stating he had no access to the International Red Cross. During his time in CIA custody, Abu Zubaydah was extensively interrogated; he was waterboarded 83 times and subjected to numerous other torture techniques including forced nudity, sleep deprivation, confinement in small dark boxes, deprivation of solid food, stress positions, and physical assaults. Videotapes of Abu Zubaydah's interrogations are among those destroyed by the CIA in 2005.

In February 2005, the CIA was reported as uncomfortable keeping Abu Zubaydah in indefinite custody, and in September 2006, Abu Zubaydah and thirteen other "high-value detainees" were transferred from CIA custody to the Guantanamo Bay detention camp. Since his transfer, the CIA has denied access to Abu Zubaydah. In 2008, the Office of the Inspector General, Department of Justice, complained that it was prevented from seeing him conducting a study of the US treatment of its detainees. He and other former CIA detainees are held in Camp 7, where conditions are the most isolating.

On July 24, 2014, the European Court of Human Rights ordered the Polish government to pay Abu Zubaydah damages. Abu Zubaydah stated through his U.S. lawyer that he would be donating the awarded funds to victims of torture.

== Biography and early activities ==
According to his younger brother Hesham, they had eight siblings. Hesham remembers his older brother "as a happy-go-lucky guy, and something of a womanizer". Zubaydah was born in 1971 in Saudi Arabia to a schoolteacher and housewife who originally hailed from the West Bank. As a teen he dressed in western clothes and had perfected the steps to Michael Jackson's Billie Jean, bucking against the traditions of Saudi society which he felt was unjust. John Kiriakou writes that he chose to study computer science in Mysore, India, as a "way to get as far away as possible from what he considered a “despicable country.”" From there, Zubaydah went along with a like-minded classmate to Afghanistan via Peshawar at the age of 20 in 1991. He joined the mujahideen and fought against Afghan Communist Government forces during the Afghan Civil War, perhaps serving under Mohamad Kamal Elzahabi. In 1992, Zubaydah was injured in an Afghan mortar attack, which left shrapnel in his head, damaged his left eye and caused severe memory loss, as well as the loss of the ability to speak for over one year.

Zubaydah eventually became involved in the training camp known as the Khalden training camp, where he oversaw the flow of recruits and obtained passports and paperwork for men transferring out of Khalden. He may also have worked as an instructor there. Although originally described as an al-Qaeda training camp, this alleged connection, which has been used as justification for holding Zubaydah and others as enemy combatants, has come under scrutiny from multiple sources, and the camp may have shut its doors in 2001 in response to an ideological division with al-Qaeda.

By 1999, the United States government was attempting to surveil Zubaydah. By March 2000, United States officials were reporting that Zubaydah was a "senior bin Laden official", the "former head of Egypt-based Islamic Jihad", a "trusted aide" to bin Laden with "growing power", who had "played a key role in the East Africa embassy attacks". Zubaydah was convicted in absentia in Jordan and sentenced to death by a Jordanian court for his role in plots to bomb U.S. and Israeli targets there. A senior Middle East security official said Zubaydah had directed the Jordanian cell and was part of "bin Laden's inner circle".

In August 2001, the classified FBI report "Bin Ladin Determined To Strike in US" said that the foiled millennium bomber, Ahmed Ressam, had confessed that Zubaydah had encouraged him to blow up the Los Angeles airport and facilitated his mission. The report said that Zubaydah was also planning his own attack on the U.S. However, when Ressam was tried in December 2001, federal prosecutors did not try to connect him to Zubaydah or refer to any of this supposed evidence in its case. After the trial, Ressam recanted his confession, saying he had been coerced into giving it.

According to a psychological evaluation conducted upon his capture, Zubaydah allegedly served as Osama bin Laden's senior lieutenant and counter-intelligence officer (i.e. third or fourth highest-ranking member of al Qaeda), managed a network of training camps, was involved in every major terrorist operation carried out by al Qaeda (including the planning of 9/11), and was engaged in planning future terrorist attacks against U.S. interests. These statements were widely echoed by members of the George W. Bush administration and other U.S. officials. Zubaydah's perceived "value" as a detainee would later be used by George W. Bush to justify the use of "enhanced interrogation techniques" and Zubaydah's detention in secret CIA prisons around the world. However, Zubaydah's connection to al Qaeda is now often said to have been – according to Rebecca Gordon in "The al Qaeda Leader Who Wasn't" – a fictitious charge. Others have said instead that it is merely overstated, and in response to his habeas corpus petition, the U.S. Government stated in 2009 that it did not contend Zubaydah had any involvement with the 9/11 attacks, or that he had even been a member of al Qaeda, simply because they did not have to: "In simple terms, the issue in this habeas corpus action is Petitioner's conduct", rather than membership or inclination: "Petitioner's personal philosophy is not relevant except to the extent that it is reflected in his actions".

== Capture ==
On March 28, 2002, CIA and FBI agents, in conjunction with Pakistani intelligence, raided several safe houses in Pakistan searching for Zubaydah. Zubaydah was apprehended from one of the targeted safe houses in Faisalabad, Pakistan. The Pakistani intelligence service had paid a small amount for a tip on his whereabouts. The United States paid far more to Pakistan for its assistance; a CIA source later said: "We paid $10 million for Zubaydah."

During the raid, Zubaydah was shot in the thigh, the testicle, and the stomach with rounds from a Kalashnikov assault rifle. Not recognized at first, he was piled into a pickup truck along with other prisoners by the Pakistani forces until senior CIA officer John Kiriakou identified him. He was taken by the Pakistanis to a Pakistani hospital nearby and treated for his wounds. The attending doctor told the CIA lead officer of the group which apprehended Zubaydah, John Kiriakou, that he had never before seen a patient survive such severe wounds. The CIA flew in a doctor from Johns Hopkins University to ensure Zubaydah would survive during transit out of Pakistan.

His pocket litter supposedly contained two bank cards, which showed that he had access to Saudi and Kuwaiti bank accounts; most al-Qaeda members used the preferred, untraceable hawala banking. According to James Risen: "It is not clear whether an investigation of the cards simply fell through the cracks, or whether they were ignored because no one wanted to know the answers about connections between al Qaeda and important figures in the Middle East—particularly in Saudi Arabia." One of Risen's sources chalks up the failure to investigate the cards to incompetence rather than foul play: "The cards were sent back to Washington and were never fully exploited. I think nobody ever looked at them because of incompetence."

When Americans investigated the cards, Risen wrote that they worked with

a Muslim financier with a questionable past, and with connections to the Afghan Taliban, al Qaeda, and Saudi intelligence. ... Saudi intelligence officials had seized all of the records related to the card from the Saudi financial institution in question; the records then disappeared. There was no longer any way to trace the money that had gone into the account.

Zubaydah was handed to the CIA. Reports later stated that he was transferred to secret CIA-operated prisons, known as black sites, in Pakistan, Thailand, Afghanistan, Poland, Northern Africa, and Diego Garcia. Historically, renditions of prisoners to countries which commit torture have been illegal. A memo written by John Yoo and signed by Jay Bybee of the Office of the Legal Counsel, DOJ, days before Zubaydah's capture, provided a legal opinion providing for CIA renditions of detainees to places such as Thailand. In March 2009, the U.S. Senate Intelligence Committee launched a year-long study on how the CIA operated the secret prisons, or black sites, around the world.

== Interrogation and torture ==
=== Top U.S. officials approved torture techniques ===
In the spring of 2002, immediately following the capture of Zubaydah, top Bush administration officials, Vice President Dick Cheney, Secretary of State Colin Powell, CIA Director George Tenet, National Security Adviser Condoleezza Rice, Secretary of Defense Rumsfeld, and US Attorney General John Ashcroft discussed at length whether or not the CIA could legally use harsh techniques against him. Condoleezza Rice specifically mentioned the SERE program during the meeting, saying, "I recall being told that U.S. military personnel were subjected to training to certain physical and psychological interrogation techniques".

In addition, in 2002 and 2003, the administration briefed several Democratic Congressional leaders on the proposed "enhanced interrogation techniques". These congressional leaders included Nancy Pelosi, the future Speaker of the House, and Representative Jane Harman. Congressional officials have stated that the attitude in the briefings ranged from "quiet acquiescence, if not downright support". Pelosi states she was "misled" and was told that the techniques were being considered, and were "legal". By 2003, after Harman had received a more detailed briefing and told the techniques were now in use, Harman and Pelosi sent a letter to the CIA to protest the use of the techniques.

The documents show that top U.S. officials were intimately involved in the discussion and approval of the harsher interrogation techniques used on Zubaydah. Condoleezza Rice ultimately told the CIA the harsher interrogation tactics were acceptable, and Dick Cheney stated, "I signed off on it; so did others." During the discussions, US Attorney General John Ashcroft is reported as saying, "Why are we talking about this in the White House? History will not judge this kindly."

=== August 2002 memo ===
In early July 2002, the Associate General Counsel CTC/Legal Group started drafting a memo to the Attorney General requesting the approval of "aggressive" interrogation methods, which otherwise would be prohibited under the provisions of Section 2340-2340B, Title 18, United States Code, on Abu Zubaydah. This memo, drafted by Office of Legal Counsel, Jay Bybee and his assistant John Yoo, is also referred to as the first "Torture Memo". Addressed to CIA acting General Counsel John A. Rizzo at his request, the purpose of the memo was to describe and authorize specific "enhanced interrogation techniques" to be used on Zubaydah. On July 26, 2002, Deputy Assistant Attorney General John Yoo informed the CIA that Attorney General John Ashcroft had approved waterboarding of Abu Zubaydah.

Journalists including Jane Mayer, Joby Warrick and Peter Finn, and Alex Koppelman have reported the CIA was already using these harsh tactics before the memo authorizing their use was written, and that it was used to provide after-the-fact legal support for harsh interrogation techniques. A Department of Justice 2009 report regarding prisoner abuses reportedly stated the memos were prepared one month after Zubaydah had already been subjected to the specific techniques authorized in an August 1, 2002, memo. John Kiriakou stated in July 2009 that Zubaydah was waterboarded in the early summer of 2002, months before the August 1, 2002, memo was written.

The memo described ten techniques which the interrogators wanted to use: "(1) attention grasp, (2) walling, (3) facial hold, (4) facial slap (insult slap), (5) cramped confinement, (6) wall standing, (7) stress positions, (8) sleep deprivation, (9) insects placed in a confinement box, and (10) the waterboard." Many of the techniques were, until then, generally considered illegal. Many other techniques developed by the CIA were held to constitute inhumane and degrading treatment and torture under the United Nations Convention against Torture and Article 3 of the European Convention on Human Rights.

As reported later, many of these interrogation techniques were previously considered illegal under U.S. and international law and treaties at the time of Zubaydah's capture. For instance, the United States had prosecuted Japanese military officials after World War II and American soldiers after the Vietnam War for waterboarding. Since 1930, the United States had defined sleep deprivation as an illegal form of torture. Many other techniques developed by the CIA constitute inhuman and degrading treatment and torture under the United Nations Convention against Torture, and Article 3 of the European Convention on Human Rights.

=== Initial interrogation of Zubaydah ===
Zubaydah was interrogated by two separate interrogation teams: the first from the FBI and one from the CIA. Ali Soufan, one of the FBI interrogators, later testified in 2009 on these issues to the Senate Committee that was investigating detainee treatment. Soufan, who witnessed part of the CIA interrogation of Zubaydah, described his treatment under the CIA as torture. The International Committee of the Red Cross and others later reached the same conclusion. While in CIA custody, Zubaydah's previously damaged left eye was surgically removed.

Because of the urgency felt about the interrogation of Zubaydah, the CIA had consulted with the president about how to proceed. The General Counsel of the CIA asked for a legal opinion from the Office of Legal Counsel, Department of Justice about what was permissible during interrogation.

=== 2003 transfer to Guantanamo ===
In August 2010, the Associated Press reported that the CIA, having concluded its agents had gotten most of the information from Zubaydah, in September 2003 transferred him and three other high-value detainees to Guantanamo. They were held at what was informally known as "Strawberry Fields", a secret camp within the complex built especially for former CIA detainees. Concerned that a pending Supreme Court decision, Rasul v. Bush (2004), might go against the Bush administration and require providing the prisoners with counsel and having to reveal data about them, on March 27, 2004, the CIA took the four men back into custody and transported them out of Guantanamo to one of their secret sites. At the time, the moves were all kept secret.

=== Subsequent interrogation ===
At a CIA black site in Thailand, Zubaydah was subjected to various forms of increasingly harsh interrogation techniques, including temperature extremes, music played at debilitating volumes, and sexual humiliation. Zubaydah was also subjected to beatings, isolation, waterboarding, long-time standing, continuous cramped confinement, and sleep deprivation.

Former CIA analyst and case officer John Kiriakou asserted that while Zubaydah was in CIA custody, a box of cockroaches was poured on him inside of a coffin he was confined to for two weeks, because of an irrational fear Zubaydah has of bugs.

During Zubaydah's interrogation, Bush learned he was on painkillers for his wounds and was proving resistant. He said to the CIA director George Tenet, "Who authorized putting him on pain medication?" It was later reported that Zubaydah was denied painkillers during his interrogation.

=== Waterboarding ===
Zubaydah was one of three or more high-value detainees subjected to waterboarding. The Bush administration in 2007 said that Zubaydah had been waterboarded once. John Kiriakou, a CIA officer who had seen the cables regarding Zubaydah's interrogation, publicly said in 2009 that Zubaydah was waterboarded once for 35 seconds before he started talking.

Intelligence sources claimed as early as 2008 that Zubaydah had been waterboarded no less than ten times in the span of one week. Zubaydah was waterboarded 83 times within the month of August 2002, the month the CIA was authorized to use this enhanced interrogation technique on him. (Note: Attributed to multiple sources:) In January 2010, Kiriakou, in a memoir, said, "Now we know that Zubaydah was waterboarded eighty-three times in a single month, raising questions about how much useful information he actually supplied."

=== International Committee of the Red Cross report ===
I struggled against the straps, trying to breathe, but it was hopeless. I thought I was going to die.

— Abu Zubaydah on being waterboarded

In February 2007, the International Committee of the Red Cross concluded a report on the treatment of "14 high-value detainees", who had been held by the CIA and, after September 2006, by the military at Guantanamo. The ICRC described the twelve enhanced interrogation techniques covered in the OLC memos to the CIA: suffocation by water (which is described as "torture" by numerous US officials), prolonged stress standing position, beatings by use of a collar, beating and kicking, confinement in a box, prolonged nudity, sleep deprivation, exposure to cold temperature, prolonged shackling, threats of ill-treatment, forced shaving, and deprivation/restricted provision of solid food. Zubaydah was the only detainee of the 14 interviewed who had been subjected to all 12 of these interrogation techniques. He was also the only one of the 14 detainees to be put into close confinement.

=== Torture drawings ===
In December 2019, The New York Times published an article in partnership with the Pulitzer Center on Crisis Reporting which was based upon drawings made by Zubaydah, showing how he was tortured in "vivid and disturbing ways". The article includes some of the drawings as well as a link to a 61-page report titled "How America Tortures", and asserts that Zubaydah was never a member of Al Qaeda. In the article Zubaydah gives gruesome details of numerous types of torture including being locked up inside a small box called "the dog box" for "countless hours", which caused muscle contractions. "The very strong pain", he said, "made me scream unconsciously". According to the Senate Intelligence Committee report on CIA torture, over a single 20 day period, Zubaydah spent over 11 days locked in a "coffin size" box, and 29 hours in a box measuring 21 inches wide, 2 1/2 feet deep, and 2 1/2 feet high (53 cm × 76 cm × 76 cm). On May 9, 2023, Zubaydah's former attorney, Mark Denbeaux of Seton Hall Law School, published a detailed report annotating the drawings.

== Intelligence obtained from Zubaydah and its after effects ==
Zubaydah's capture was touted as the biggest of the war on terror until that of Khalid Sheikh Mohammed. The director of the FBI stated Zubaydah's capture would help deter future attacks.

In a speech in 2006, Bush claimed that Zubaydah revealed useful intelligence when "enhanced interrogation" was used, including identification of two important suspects and information that allegedly helped foil a terrorist attack on American soil. These claims directly conflict with the reports of the FBI agents who first interrogated Zubaydah. He gave them the names before torture was used, and the third piece of information came from other sources who had been receiving crucial pieces of information from him without the use of harsher techniques, as well as other government officials.

=== Iraq War (2003) ===
The Bush administration relied on some of Zubaydah's claims in justifying the invasion of Iraq. U.S. officials stated that the allegations that Iraq and al-Qaeda were linked in the training of people on chemical weapons came from Zubaydah. The officials noted there was no independent verification of his claims.

The U.S. government included statements made by Zubaydah in regards to al Qaeda's ability to obtain a dirty bomb to show a link between Iraq and al Qaeda. According to a Senate Intelligence Committee report of 2004, Zubaydah said that "he had heard that an important al Qaeda associate, Abu Musab al Zarqawi, and others had good relationships with Iraqi intelligence." However, the year before, in June 2003, Zubaydah and Khalid Sheikh Mohammed were reported as saying there was no link between Saddam Hussein and al Qaeda.

In the Senate Armed Services Committee 2008 report on the abuses of detainees, the Bush administration was described as having applied pressure to interrogators to find a link between Iraq and al Qaeda prior to the Iraq War. Major Paul Burney, a psychiatrist with the United States Army, said to the committee, "while we were [at Guantanamo] a large part of the time we were focused on trying to establish a link between al Qaeda and Iraq and we were not being successful." He said that higher-ups were "frustrated" and applied "more and more pressure to resort to measures that might produce more immediate results."

Colonel Lawrence B. Wilkerson, the former chief of staff for former Secretary of State Colin Powell said:

Likewise, what I have learned is that as the administration authorized harsh interrogation in April and May 2002—well before the Justice Department had rendered any legal opinion—its principal priority for intelligence was not aimed at pre-empting another terrorist attack on the U.S. but discovering a smoking gun linking Iraq and al-Qa'ida. So furious was this effort that on one particular detainee, even when the interrogation team had reported to Cheney's office that their detainee "was compliant" (meaning the team recommended no more torture), the VP's office ordered them to continue the enhanced methods. The detainee had not revealed any al-Qa'ida-Baghdad contacts yet. This ceased only after Ibn al-Shaykh al-Libi, under waterboarding in Egypt, "revealed" such contacts. Of course, later we learned that al-Libi revealed these contacts only to get the torture to stop.

=== May 30, 2005, memo ===
The final memo mentioned Zubaydah several times. It claimed that due to the enhanced interrogation techniques, Zubaydah "provided significant information on two operatives, [including] José Padilla[,] who planned to build and detonate a 'dirty bomb' in the Washington DC area." This claim is strongly disputed by Ali Soufan, the FBI interrogator who first interrogated Zubaydah following his capture, by traditional means. He said the most valuable information was gained before torture was used. Other intelligence officers have also disputed that claim. Soufan, when asked in 2009 by Senator Sheldon Whitehouse during a Congressional hearing if the memo was incorrect, testified that it was. The memo noted that not all of the waterboarding sessions were necessary for Zubaydah, since the on-scene interrogation team determined he had stopped producing actionable intelligence. The memo reads:

This is not to say that the interrogation program has worked perfectly. According to the IG Report, the CIA, at least initially, could not always distinguish detainees who had information but were successfully resisting interrogation from those who did not actually have the information. See IG Report at 83–85. On at least one occasion, this may have resulted in what might be deemed in retrospect to have been the unnecessary use of enhanced techniques. On that occasion, although the on-scene interrogation team judged Zubaydah to be compliant, elements within CIA Headquarters still believed he was withholding information. See id at 84. At the direction of CIA Headquarters, interrogators therefore used the waterboard one more time on Zubaydah.

John McLaughlin, former acting CIA director, stated in 2006, "I totally disagree with the view that the capture of Zubaydah was unimportant. Zubaydah was woven through all of the intelligence prior to 9/11 that signaled a major attack was coming, and his capture yielded a great deal of important information."

In his 2007 memoir, former CIA director George Tenet writes:

A published report in 2006 contended that Zubaydah was mentally unstable and that the administration had overstated his importance. Baloney. Zubaydah had been at the crossroads of many al-Qa'ida operations and was in position to—and did—share critical information with his interrogators. Apparently, the source of the rumor that Zubaydah was unbalanced was his personal diary, in which he adopted various personas. From that shaky perch, some junior Freudians leapt to the conclusion that Zubaydah had multiple personalities. In fact, Agency psychiatrists eventually determined that in his diary he was using a sophisticated literary device to express himself.

== Zubaydah's mental health ==
When he was captured, a search of the safehouse turned up Zubaydah's 10,000-page diaries, in which he recorded his thoughts as a young boy, a young man, and at his then-current age. What appears to be multiple separate identities is how Zubaydah was piecing his memories together after his 1992 shrapnel head wound. As part of his therapy to regain his memories, he began recording a diary that detailed his life, emotions, and what people were telling him. He split information into categories, such as what he knew about himself and what people told him, and listed them under different names to distinguish one set from the other. This was later interpreted by some analysts reviewing the diary as symptoms of dissociative identity disorder, which some others disputed and said to be incorrect.

Some people are concerned about Zubaydah's mental stability and how that has affected information he has given to interrogators. Ron Suskind noted in his book, The One Percent Doctrine: Deep Inside America's Pursuit of Its Enemies Since 9/11 (2006), that Zubaydah was mentally ill or disabled due to a severe head injury. He described Zubaydah as keeping a diary "in the voice of three people: Hani 1, Hani 2, and Hani 3"—a boy, a young man and a middle-aged alter ego. Zubaydah's diaries spanned ten years and recorded in numbing detail "what he ate, or wore, or trifling things [people] said". Dan Coleman, then the FBI's top al-Qaeda analyst, told a senior bureau official, "This guy is insane, certifiable, split personality." According to Suskind, this judgment was "echoed at the top of CIA and was briefed to the President and Vice President." Coleman stated Zubaydah was a "safehouse keeper" with mental problems, who "claimed to know more about al-Qaeda and its inner workings than he really did."

Joseph Margulies, Zubaydah's co-counsel, wrote in an op-ed in the Los Angeles Times in 2009:

Partly as a result of injuries he suffered while he was fighting the communists in Afghanistan, partly as a result of how those injuries were exacerbated by the CIA and partly as a result of his extended isolation, Zubaydah's mental grasp is slipping away. Today, he suffers blinding headaches and has permanent brain damage. He has an excruciating sensitivity to sounds, hearing what others do not. The slightest noise drives him nearly insane. In the last two years alone, he has experienced about 200 seizures. Already, he cannot picture his mother's face or recall his father's name. Gradually, his past, like his future, eludes him.

== Legal status ==
President Bush referred to Zubaydah in a speech to Congress September 2006 requesting a bill to authorize military commissions, following the U.S. Supreme Court ruling in Hamdan v. Rumsfeld (2006) that held the tribunals as formulated by the executive branch were unconstitutional. Congress rapidly passed legislation that was signed by the president.

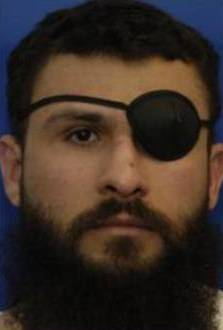
Mugshot of Zubaydah from 2008

Less than one month after Zubaydah's capture, Justice Department officials said Zubaydah was "a near-ideal candidate for a tribunal trial". Several months later in 2002, US officials said there was "no rush" to try Zubaydah via military commission.

At his Combatant Status Review Tribunal in 2007, Zubaydah said he was told that the CIA realized he was not significant.

"They told me, 'Sorry, we discover that you are not Number 3, not a partner, not even a fighter,'" said Zubaydah, speaking in broken English, according to the new transcript of a Combatant Status Review Tribunal held at the U.S. military prison in Guantanamo Bay, Cuba.

Abu Zubaydah's lawyers, including Joseph Margulies and George Brent Mickum IV, filed a lawsuit in July 2008 challenging his detention at Guantanamo Bay detention camps after the Boumediene v. Bush ruling. The judge overseeing the case, Richard W. Roberts, failed to rule on any motions related to the case, even the preliminary ones. This led Zubaydah's lawyers to file a motion asking Judge Roberts to recuse himself for nonfeasance in January 2015. On March 16, 2016, Roberts retired early from the federal bench, citing unspecified health issues.

In January 2025, a group of experts from the United Nations called for Zubaydah's immediate release, including the "exceptional" request that he receive a presidential pardon.

The U.S. government has not officially charged Zubaydah with any crimes. The Senate Intelligence Committee report on CIA torture reported that Zubaydah's CIA interrogators wanted him to "remain in isolation and incommunicado for the remainder of his life."

=== Joint Review Task Force ===
When he assumed Presidential office in January 2009, Barack Obama made a number of promises about the future of Guantanamo. He promised the use of torture would cease at the camp and to institute a new review system composed of officials from six departments, where the OARDEC reviews were conducted entirely by the Department of Defense. When it reported back, a year later, the Joint Review Task Force classified some individuals as too dangerous to be transferred from Guantanamo, even though there was no evidence to justify laying charges against them. On April 9, 2013, that document was made public after a Freedom of Information Act request. Zubaydah was one of the 71 individuals deemed too innocent to charge but too dangerous to release. Although Obama promised that those deemed too innocent to charge but too dangerous to release would start to receive reviews from a Periodic Review Board, less than a quarter of men have received a review. Zubaydah was denied approval for transfer on September 22, 2016.

== European Court of Human Rights decision ==
On 24 July 2014, the European Court of Human Rights (ECHR) ruled that Poland had violated the European Convention on Human Rights when it cooperated with US allowing the CIA to hold and torture Zubaydah and Abd al-Rahim al-Nashiri on its territory in 2002–2003. The court ordered the Polish government to pay each of the men €100,000 in damages. It also awarded Zubaydah €30,000 to cover his costs.

On 31 May 2018, the ECHR ruled that Romania and Lithuania also violated the rights of Abu Zubaydah and Abd al-Rahim al-Nashiri in 2003–2005 and in 2005–2006 respectively, and Lithuania and Romania were ordered to pay €100,000 in damages each to Abu Zubaydah and Abd al-Nashiri.

In 2026 he entered into a confidential out of court settlement for substantial damages from the British Government resulting from his civil action for damages arising from the UK state having been complicit in his torture.

== U.S. Supreme Court decision ==
In connection with the European Court of Human Rights proceedings, Zubaydah filed suit in the U.S. seeking disclosure of information related to the matter. The U.S. government intervened, seeking to assert a state secrets privilege. The U.S. district court decided in favor of the government and dismissed the case. On appeal, the dismissal was reversed on a ruling that the state secrets privilege did not apply to information that was already publicly known. In 2022, the Supreme Court reversed the appeal ruling in United States v. Zubaydah, explaining that the state secrets privilege applies to the existence (or nonexistence) of a secret CIA facility and that revelation by government would confirm or deny that state secret.

== See also ==
- Shaker Aamer
- The Report
