= Torture Memos =

2002 US government legal memoranda

The January 9, 2002 memo draft

A set of legal memoranda known as the "Torture Memos" (officially the Memorandum Regarding Military Interrogation of Alien Unlawful Combatants Held Outside The United States) were drafted by John Yoo as Deputy Assistant Attorney General of the United States and signed in August 2002 by Assistant Attorney General Jay S. Bybee, head of the Office of Legal Counsel of the United States Department of Justice. They advised the Central Intelligence Agency, the United States Department of Defense, and the president on the use of enhanced interrogation techniques—mental and physical torment and coercion such as prolonged sleep deprivation, binding in stress positions, and waterboarding—and stated that such acts, widely regarded as torture, might be legally permissible under an expansive interpretation of presidential authority during the Global War on Terrorism.

Following accounts of the Abu Ghraib torture and prisoner abuse scandal in Iraq, one of the memos was leaked to the press in June 2004. Jack Goldsmith, then head of the Office of Legal Counsel, had already withdrawn the Yoo memos and advised agencies not to rely on them. After Goldsmith was forced to resign because of his objections, Attorney General John Ashcroft issued a one paragraph opinion re-authorizing the use of torture. Then in December 2004, another head of OLC reaffirmed the original legal opinions.

In May 2005, the CIA requested new legal opinions about the interrogation techniques it was using. The OLC issued three memos that month, signed by Steven G. Bradbury, ruling on the legality of the authorized techniques if agents followed certain constraints. In addition to these memos issued by the OLC to executive agencies, internal memos were written related to the use of torture in interrogation of detainees; for instance, in 2002 and 2003, Donald Rumsfeld, Secretary of Defense, signed several memos authorizing "Special Interrogation Plans" for specific detainees held at Guantanamo Bay in an attempt to gain more information from them.

The memoranda have been the focus of considerable controversy over executive power, government practices, and the treatment of detainees during the George W. Bush administration. The orders were rescinded by Barack Obama on January 22, 2009, two days after he started his presidency.

== The "Torture Memos" ==
The term "torture memos" was originally used to refer to three documents prepared by the Office of Legal Counsel at the United States Department of Justice and signed in August 2002: "Standards of Conduct for Interrogation under 18 U.S.C. sections 2340–2340A" and "Interrogation of al-Qaeda" (both drafted by Jay Bybee), and an untitled letter from John Yoo to Alberto Gonzales.

Since the initial revelation of these documents, other communications related to the use of torture to coerce or intimidate detainees during the Bush administration have been divulged. These include a December 2, 2002, internal Department of Defense memo signed by Donald Rumsfeld, then secretary of defense, authorizing seventeen techniques in a "Special Interrogation Plan" to be used against the detainee Mohammed al-Qahtani; a March 13, 2003, legal opinion written by John Yoo of the Office of Legal Counsel, DoJ, and issued to the General Counsel of Defense five days before the U.S. invasion of Iraq started, concluding that federal laws related to use of torture and other abuse did not apply to agents interrogating foreigners overseas; and other DoD internal memos authorizing techniques for specific military interrogations of certain individual detainees.

In 2005, Alberto Gonzales testified before Congress that the CIA sought the 2002 opinion after having captured Abu Zubaydah in 2002, who was then believed to be a significant al-Qaeda figure who could provide important information to U.S. efforts to constrain and prevent terrorism. They were anxious to get as much information from Zubaydah as fast as possible. Questions by CIA officers over which tactics could be used on the detainee had spurred writing the torture memo, which is reflected in the language of the memo; "You have asked for this advice in the course of conducting interrogations of Abu Zubaydah." The memo's author, John Yoo, acknowledged the memo authorized the "enhanced interrogation techniques" used by the CIA in Zubaydah's interrogation. Yoo told an interviewer in 2007, "there was an urgency to decide so that valuable intelligence could be acquired from Abu Zubaydah, before further attacks could occur."

=== Standards of Conduct for Interrogation under 18 U.S.C. §§ 2340–2340A ===
Jay Bybee, then assistant U.S. attorney general and head of the OLC, addressed a memorandum to Alberto Gonzales, then counsel to the president, dated August 1, 2002, titled "Standards for Conduct for Interrogation under 18 U.S.C. §§ 2340–2340A." He was responding to the president's reported request for a legal opinion on the U.N. Convention Against Torture and 18 U.S.C. section 2340 and the interrogation of al-Qaeda operatives.

This is the primary "torture memo," which defines the Department of Justice's (DOJ) interpretation of torture. It is relied upon heavily by the subsequent "torture memos." It discusses the language of the torture statute (18 U.S.C. §§ 2340–2340A) in detail in order to derive its definition of torture, states that "cruel, inhuman, or degrading" treatment is not torture according to that statute; and examines "possible defenses that would negate any claim that certain interrogation methods violate the statute". It concludes that torture is only: extreme acts according to the United Nations Convention against Torture; that severe pain (a requisite for this definition of torture) is "serious physical injury, such as organ failure, impairment of bodily function, or even death"; that prolonged mental harm is harm that must last for "months or even years"; that "prosecution under Section 2340A may be barred because enforcement of the statute would represent an unconstitutional infringement of the President's authority to conduct war"; and that "under the current circumstances, necessity or self-defense may justify interrogation methods that might violate Section 2340A."

==== Part I ====
Part one, in which the text and history of the U.S. torture statute (18 U.S.C. §§ 2340–2340A) is examined, mainly addresses Bybee's interpretation of the definition of torture, including the definition of severe physical and mental pain or suffering.

In the first section, the memorandum states that the statute requires specific intent (the convention only requires general intent, but the "specific intent" language is found in the U.S. ratification reservation), and in citing case law, precedent states that specific intent means that "the infliction of [severe] pain must be the defendant's precise objective" and reminds the reader that "general intent" requires only actions that would be reasonably likely to result in a violation of the statute. The article concludes that, "even if the defendant knows that severe pain will result from his actions, if causing such harm is not his objective, he lacks the requisite specific intent". It suggests that a jury would likely act contrary to law (out of misunderstanding) by finding such an individual guilty regardless.

In the second section, the memo admits difficulty in finding any clear definition for the "severe pain or suffering" required by the torture statute (which is also required by the UN Convention). After examining the definition provided in various dictionaries, it concludes that "pain" is synonymous with "suffering" ("it is difficult to conceive of such suffering that would not involve severe physical pain"), and, selecting among the many definitions, the memo proposes that severe pain must be difficult to endure (some definitions quoted in the memo define severe pain as "inflicting discomfort"). In searching for a reference to the term in other U.S. statutes and law, it quotes from a health care law that defines "emergency condition", but merely mentions "severe pain" in passing. That statutory subsection, 8 U.S.C. § 1395w-22(d)(3)(B), defines an emergency condition as a condition "manifesting itself by acute symptoms of sufficient severity (including severe pain) such that [one] ... could reasonably expect the absence of immediate medical attention to result in placing the health of the individual ... in serious jeopardy, serious impairment to bodily functions, or serious dysfunction of any bodily organ or part".

The memorandum concludes with a narrow definition of torture, that its "severe pain" must necessarily be pain associated with "death, organ failure, or serious impairment of body functions". It also states that the statute requires "prolonged mental harm" to accompany mental or physical pain, and that "prolonged" means a duration of months or years.

==== Part II ====
The memo discusses the Convention Against Torture (which the memo calls the "Torture Convention") and concludes that the convention makes a distinction between torture and "cruel, inhuman, or degrading treatment or punishment", and that therefore torture is "only the most extreme acts", which the memo concludes, together with the ratifying reservations of the United States, confirms the interpretation of torture found in part one. It concludes that torture does not include "other acts of cruel, inhuman or degrading treatment or punishment" because such language is found in a different article than the definition of torture, and because it appears that the convention does not intend to criminalize such action, but instead discourage it. The memo examines the ratification history, and cites U.S. case law stating that the executive branch's interpretation of the treaty "is to be accorded the greatest weight in ascertaining a treaty's intent and meaning". It finds in the congressional record that the Reagan administration understood torture to be "at the extreme end of cruel, inhuman and degrading treatment or punishment", and that such treatment or punishment, which is not torture, to be "the cruel, unusual, and inhumane treatment or punishment prohibited by the Fifth, Eighth and/or Fourteenth Amendments to the Constitution of the United States."

The understanding of the George H. W. Bush administration, which ratified the Convention, was different from that of the Reagan administration. It failed to promote any language regarding torture to be only "extremely cruel" behavior resulting in "excruciating and agonizing" pain, and instead, filed a reservation that quoted the text of the U.S. torture statute. The memorandum states that, on the basis of the conclusions reached in part one, "there was little difference between these two understandings and ... the further definition of mental pain or suffering merely sought remove [sic] the vagueness created by concept of 'agonizing and excruciating mental pain." The memo quotes a legal adviser of the Department of State, who stated that, "no higher standard was intended by the Reagan administration understanding than was present in the Convention or the Bush understanding".

The memo examines the negotiating history of the Convention, and finds that the U.S. originally proposed the terms "extremely severe pain or suffering", and that the U.K. proposed the terms, "extreme pain or suffering rather than ... severe pain or suffering", and states that "[u]ltimately, in choosing the phrase "severe pain", the parties concluded that this phrase "sufficient[ly] ... convey[ed] the idea that only acts of a certain gravity shall ... constitute torture", rather than all acts that are inhumane and degrading. It concludes that the "ratification history and negotiating history [of the convention] all confirm that Section 2340A reaches only the most heinous acts", and thus implies that this confirms its definition of torture in part one, section two of this memo.

==== Part III ====
Part three summarizes various techniques within the case law to outline the kind of conduct that the courts have previously found to be torture. The memo states that, through an analysis of those cases, "courts are likely to take a totality-of-the-circumstances approach, and will look to an entire course of conduct, to determine whether certain acts will violate Section 2340A." After reviewing a number of torture-related cases in the U.S., in which victims were subjected to beatings, burning, electric shocks, and the threat of such actions, it states that, "we believe that interrogation techniques would have to be similar to these in their extreme nature and in the type of harm caused to violate the law." It does discuss one case in which the federal court states that an isolated incident, such as a single blow to the stomach, is sufficient alone to be torture, but the memo states that this is in error, because "a single blow does not reach the requisite level of severity [to constitute torture]." It later says that this conclusion is "based on our interpretation of the criminal statute" found in section two of part one of this memo. Although the memo states that nowhere in the case law can a clear interpretation or definition of torture be found, because the cases it did find were all regarding extreme acts, it concludes that this confirms the memo's definition of torture.

==== Part IV ====
Part four examines international case law regarding torture, and concludes that while there are many methods that might be cruel, inhuman and degrading treatment, "they do not produce pain or suffering of the necessary intensity to meet the definition of torture." It discusses two cases:

- A case in the European Court of Human Rights that found that wall standing, hooding, subjection to noise, sleep deprivation, and deprivation of food and drink, used in combination for a long period fall into the category of inhuman treatment, but not torture, since "they did not experience suffering of the particular intensity and cruelty implied by the word torture."
- A case from the Israel Supreme Court that does not mention torture at all, but only cruel and inhumane treatment, which the memo states is evidence that the actions addressed by that court were not torture.

==== Part V ====
Part five of the memo analyzes constitutional law as to whether the statute passed by Congress infringes on the powers of the president to conduct war, and concludes that it is unconstitutional. It states specifically that the nation was "in the middle of a war in which the nation [had] already suffered a direct attack", and that limiting interrogations would encroach on the president's ability to prevent future attacks. The memo summarizes the terrorist threat from al-Qaeda, including the September 11 attacks, and states that interrogation of al-Qaeda operatives led to the stopping of José Padilla's planned attack. It provides case law supporting its position of the executive branch to conduct war. It also argues that prosecution of individuals following orders from the president, even if in violation of § 2340A, should not be possible, since it would impinge upon the president's powers as commander-in-chief.

==== Part VI ====
Part six of the memo is titled "Defenses" and concludes that "under the current circumstances, necessity or self-defense may justify interrogation methods that might violate Section 2340A." This is provided as a fail safe argument, because the author believes that, according to his view in part five of the memo, prosecution would probably be impossible.

==== Conclusion ====
In the conclusion section of the memorandum, Bybee summarizes what is viewed as the most important conclusions of the memorandum, namely the definition of torture, the possible unconstitutionality of the torture statute as applied to the president, and the legal justification of necessity or self-defense for any acts that might be torture.

=== Interrogation of al-Qaeda operative ===
Jay Bybee addressed a memorandum to John A. Rizzo, then the acting general counsel of the CIA, dated August 1, 2002, in response to the CIA's reported request for legal opinion on 18 U.S.C. § 2340 (the torture statute) as applied to the interrogation of Abu Zubaydah. There was much administration opposition to releasing this memorandum to the public, and the first release was almost completely redacted. It summarizes the facts regarding Abu Zubaydah and his resistance to interrogation, as related by the CIA. It summarizes the various methods of physical and psychological coercion to be used by the CIA against Zubaydah (see next section, Part I for details). It discusses the background of Zubaydah and the possible mental effects from such abuse, the background of the consultant to be assisting, and the details of the proposed coercive actions. It then applies the U.S. torture statute (18 U.S.C. §§ 2340–2340A) to each of these proposed actions. It concludes that none of these methods individually or simultaneously would be considered torture according to law.

==== Part I ====
The first part says that the advice is provided in this memorandum applies only to the facts at hand regarding Abu Zubaydah, and that the conclusions of the memorandum may change given different facts. Those facts, according to the top secret memorandum, are that Abu Zubaydah was being held by the United States, and that, "[t]he interrogation team is certain that he has additional information that he refuses to divulge" regarding terrorist groups in the U.S. or Saudi Arabia planning attacks in the U.S. or overseas. It does not give any specifics or note what makes this conclusion certain. The memorandum states that it appears that the suspect has grown accustomed to their interrogation techniques, and refers to the threat of a possible attack in the United States by unknown individuals. Without further discussion, the fact summary concludes that the "high level of threat [the reader] believe[s] now exists" is why advice regarding further techniques is being sought. Continuing to summarize the facts, the memorandum summarizes the characteristics of the professionals present during the proposed interrogation techniques, and summarizes those coercive methods. It states that the purpose of these methods will be to "convince Zubaydah that the only way he can influence his surrounding environment is through cooperation". The memorandum describes in detail each of the techniques proposed as generally used, including attention grasp, walling, facial hold, insult slap, cramped confinement (large and small and with and without an insect), wall standing, stress positions, sleep deprivation, and waterboarding. It clarifies that a medical expert will always be present "to prevent severe physical or mental harm[.]"

==== Part II ====
Part two of this memorandum goes into detail how the techniques described in part one will be applied in Abu Zubaydah's case. It describes the CIA practices, and reminds them how those practices are applied "to ensure that no prolonged mental harm would result from the use of these proposed procedures". This section reviews how no appreciable harm has ever resulted from the application of these techniques on U.S. military personnel, and that these techniques have the approval of the government medical experts who train in the application and subversion of these techniques. It summarizes the psychological profile provided of the subject, including his involvement in high-level terrorist activities [Note: as believed at the time, but found to be wrong] with al-Qaeda and his background training operatives in resistance to interrogation, as well as his radical thinking, such as the fact that he "has stated during interviews that he thinks of any activity outside of jihad as "silly". It states that after substantial research of the individual's background, behavior and journal entries, interrogators believe he does not suffer from any psychological disorders or disturbances. This section concludes by emphasizing the potential value of the information he could provide, as well as his likely strong ability to resist standard interrogation techniques.

==== Part III ====
This section provides legal analysis of the U.S. anti-torture law (18 U.S.C. §§ 2340–2340A) and the application of each of the proposed techniques in this particular situation. After summarizing the law, it analyses the elements of the offense of torture (inflicting severe pain or suffering), and the specific (or criminal) intent required by the statute for the offense.

=== Letter from Yoo to Alberto Gonzales ===
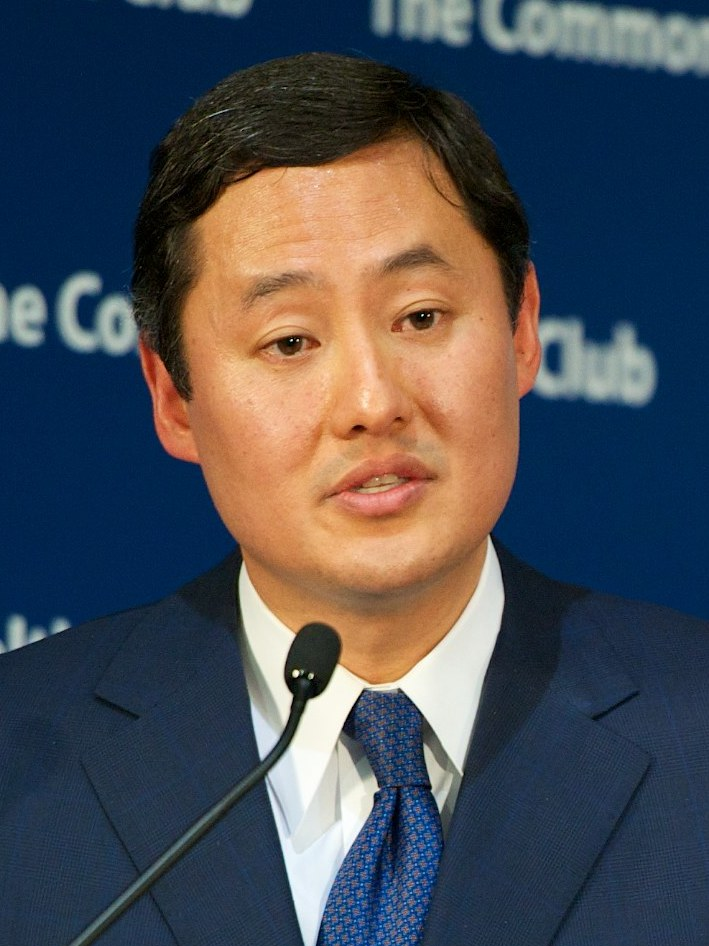
John Yoo, who drafted the Torture Memos

John Yoo, then deputy assistant attorney general in the Office of Legal Counsel, addressed a memorandum to Alberto Gonzales, then the counsel to the president, dated August 1, 2002, in response to Gonzales' reported request for legal opinion on whether interrogation methods used on al-Qaeda operatives would be in violation of the U.N. Convention Against Torture, and whether such actions could be the basis for prosecution in the International Criminal Court. The letter is intended to supplement the memorandum sent to Gonzales the same day by Jay Bybee, to which it occasionally refers. The letter concludes that the interpretation of the Department of Justice of 18 U.S.C. § 2340, which enacted into U.S. law the Convention Against Torture, does not conflict with the Convention because the United States recorded its reservations upon ratification. It also concludes that "actions taken as part of the interrogation ... cannot fall within the jurisdiction of the ICC, although it would be impossible to control the actions of a rogue prosecutor or judge." The letter explains the Department of Justice's interpretation of §§ 2340–2340A, their interpretation of the Convention Against Torture as applied to the United States and the status of the U.S. reservations, and explains its position on the possibility of prosecution by the ICC.

==== Part I ====
In the explanation of the definition of torture according to 18 U.S.C. § 2340, it emphasizes the need for the pain to be severe, although it does not attempt to define what "severe pain or suffering" means. It also emphasizes that the individual inflicting such pain must have "specific intention to inflict severe pain or suffering". The letter explains § 2340's definition of "severe mental pain or suffering", and reminds the reader of the need for "prolonged mental harm".

==== Part II ====
As the memo quotes from the definition of torture in the Convention Against Torture, it compares that definition to the one found in the U.S. statute, and analyzes the effect of the ratification reservation of the U.S. to the Convention. That reservation was mainly regarding Article One of the Convention, which defines torture, but it also states that the U.S. refuses to accept the jurisdiction of the International Court of Justice regarding conformity to the Convention. The memo notes that in the reservation, the U.S. added language of "specific intent" (as opposed to the "general intent" in the Convention), and it explained what was meant by mental pain or suffering (as in the U.S. statute). Commenting on the specificity of the reservation and statute regarding mental pain or suffering, the memo says, "this understanding ensured that mental torture would rise to a severity comparable to that required in the context of physical torture." The memo explains treaty law, which states that the U.S. is bound to the treaty only as modified by the reservation, and points out that the language of the reservation is "nearly identical" to that of 18 U.S.C. § 2340. Therefore, it states, if the interrogation conduct did not violate the U.S. statute, it would also not violate the U.S. obligations under the Convention. While the letter states there is little substantive difference between the definition of torture in the text of the statute (or reservation) and in the Convention, most of the material in this part of the memo is dedicated to explaining why the reservation to the Convention is valid and cannot be overturned. The memo closes this section reminding the reader of the refusal of the U.S. to accept the jurisdiction of the ICC, and that, "[a]lthough the Convention creates a [c]ommittee to monitor compliance, [the committee] can only conduct studies and has no enforcement powers."

==== Part III ====
In discussing the possible prosecution by the ICC, the memo states that the U.S. did not ratify the necessary treaty for such jurisdiction (the Rome Statute). The memo further argues that even if the ICC were to claim jurisdiction, "interrogation of an al-Qaeda operative could not constitute a crime under the Rome Statute," since it would not involve the "widespread and systematic attack directed against any civilian population" and would not be considered a war crime. Yoo writes that, in his opinion, "[t]he United States' campaign against al-Qaeda is an attack on a non-state terrorist organization, not a civilian population." He also reiterates President W. Bush's "assertion" that "neither members of the al-Qaeda terrorist network nor Taliban soldiers were entitled to the legal status of prisoners of war under the [Geneva Convention]," and therefore planned interrogation methods would not constitute a violation of the Geneva Convention, or war crime. This interpretation of the Geneva Convention was sent in memos, despite objections by attorneys and the secretary of state, on January 9, 2002, January 22, 2002, February 1, 2002, and again on February 7, 2002.

==== Conclusion ====
Yoo concludes the letter by stating, "It is possible that an ICC official would ignore the clear limitations imposed by the Rome Statute, or at least disagree with the President's interpretation of [the Geneva Convention]. Of course, the problem of the 'rogue prosecutor' is not limited to questions about the interrogation of al-Qaeda operatives, but is a potential risk for any number of actions that have been undertaken during the Afghanistan campaign... We cannot predict the political actions of international institutions."

=== March 14, 2003, Memo from Yoo to DoD re: interrogation methods overseas ===
After Bybee was confirmed in his appointment as a federal judge on March 13, John Yoo was the acting head of the OLC. He wrote a memo to the DoD on March 14, 2003, concluding that "federal laws against torture, assault and maiming would not apply to the overseas interrogation of terror suspects". This was five days before the Iraq War. The legal opinion had been requested by William J. Haynes, General Counsel of the Department of Defense. Yoo was acting head of OLC for several months before Jack Goldsmith was approved for the position. In 2008, leaders of the Senate Intelligence and Armed Services committees concluded that the memo was used by the DoD to "justify harsh interrogation practices on terror suspects at Guantánamo Bay" and the Abu Ghraib torture and prisoner abuse.

== OLC head Jack Goldsmith's withdrawal ==
After Bybee resigned from the Department of Justice in March 2003 for a federal judgeship in Nevada, Attorney General Ashcroft vetoed the White House's choice of John Yoo as his successor. Yoo was acting head of OLC for several months.

Jack Goldsmith was appointed to succeed Bybee as head of the Office of Legal Counsel and took office in October 2003. A professor at the University of Chicago Law School before entering government service, he had previously been legal adviser to William Haynes, the general counsel of the Department of Defense.

In the spring of 2004, the Abu Ghraib prisoner scandal broke into the news, and in June 2004, the Bybee memo was leaked to the press. Based on his review of the Torture Memos, Goldsmith concluded that they were legally defective and had to be withdrawn. In his book The Terror Presidency (2007), Goldsmith called them "cursory and one-sided legal arguments." Goldsmith says he had decided to revoke what the CIA had been calling its "golden shield" against prosecution six months before the abuses at Abu Ghraib were revealed. He was at work on the problem when the scandal and the leak of the memo precipitated the final decision.

When Goldsmith brought his decision to White House counsel Alberto Gonzales and vice presidential counsel David Addington, Goldsmith wrote, Gonzales seemed "puzzled and slightly worried," while Addington "was just plain mad." Goldsmith submitted his resignation at the same time.

Reflecting afterward on the Torture Memos as a cautionary tale, Goldsmith wrote in his 2007 memoir:

How could this have happened? How could OLC have written opinions that, when revealed to the world weeks after the Abu Ghraib scandal broke, made it seem as though the administration was giving official sanction to torture, and brought such dishonor on the United States, the Bush administration, the Department of Justice, and the CIA? How could its opinions reflect such bad judgement, be so poorly reasoned, and have such terrible tone?... The main explanation is fear [of a new attack]. Fear explains why OLC pushed the envelope. And in pushing the envelope, OLC took shortcuts in its opinion-writing procedures.

Goldsmith's tenure at OLC was ten months. He resigned, he said, for several reasons, but the main one was that, due to withdrawing the Torture Memos, "important people inside the administration had come to question my . . . reliability." He had been unable to finish replacement legal opinions so that task fell to his successors. But, later that year, an opinion was issued by his successor at the OLC that changed the very narrow definition of torture from the original legal opinions of the Bush administration on this topic.

== Revised opinion, December 2004 ==
The superseding OLC opinion of December 30, 2004, "Definition of Torture Under 18 U.S.C. §§ 2340–2340A" written by Daniel Levin, acting assistant attorney general, Office of Legal Counsel, rolled back the narrow definition of torture in the memos. He noted, "[w]hile we have identified various disagreements with the August 2002 Memorandum, we have reviewed this Office's prior opinions addressing issues involving treatment of detainees and do not believe that any of their conclusions would be different under the standards set forth in this memorandum."

== Bradbury memoranda ==
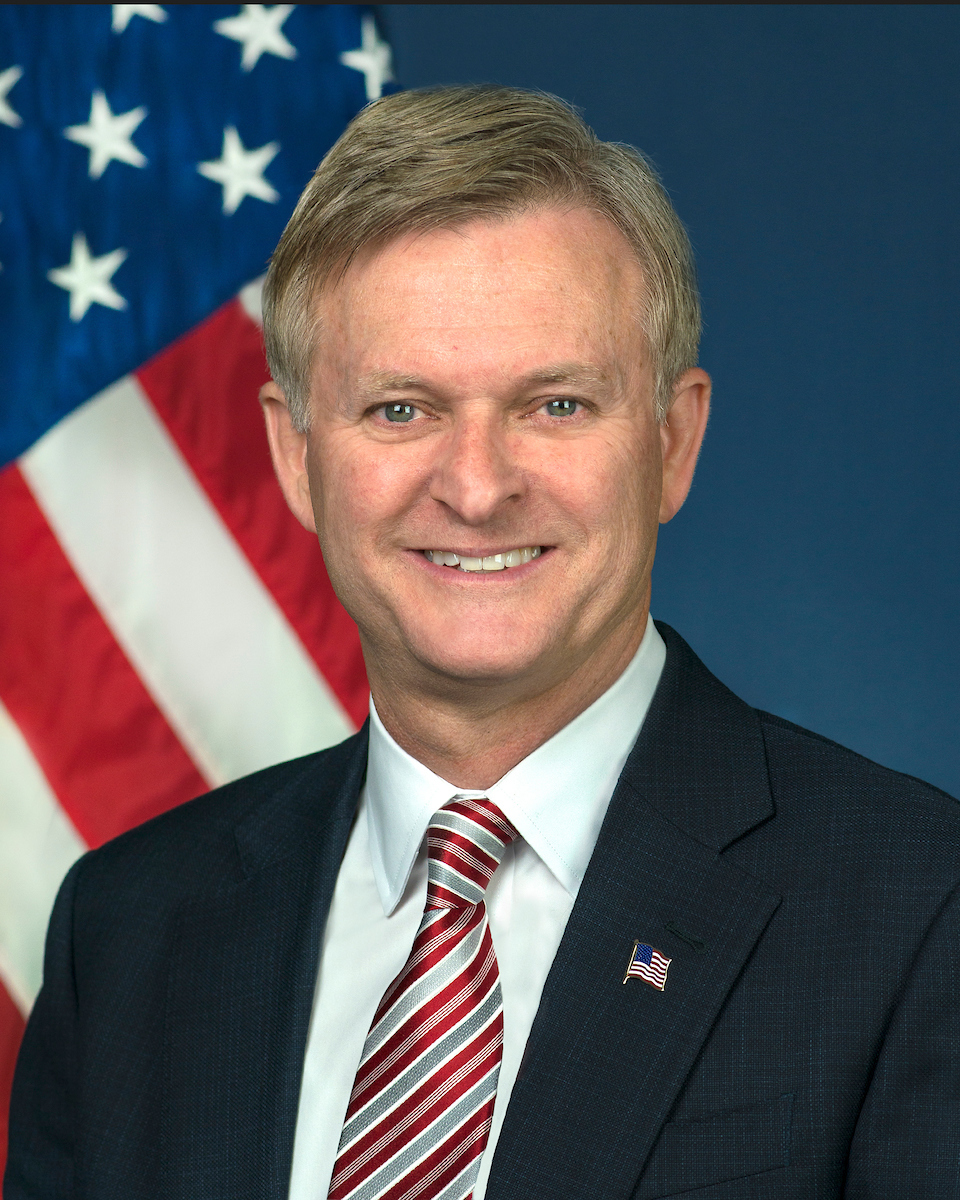
Steven G. Bradbury (2017), former head of the Office of Legal Counsel under George W. Bush

In 2005, CIA lawyers reviewed videotapes of interrogations of detainees. Increasingly concerned about the legal implications of their practices, John Rizzo, then Acting General Counsel of the agency, requested the Office of Legal Counsel, Department of Justice, for new legal opinions on the use of these techniques. Steven G. Bradbury as head of the OLC signed three memos issued in May 2005 advising the CIA that a limited set of interrogation techniques could be used, according to certain constraints. The permissible techniques included waterboarding, walling, stress positions, striking a prisoner, exposure to extreme temperatures, and forced sleep deprivation of up to 180 hours (7 1/2 days), including multiple techniques when used in combination.

The OLC said that the techniques did not violate the Convention Against Torture, as ratified by the United States in 1994. That year, the CIA destroyed the videotapes of the interrogations.

Bradbury authored an additional memo dated July 2007, seeking to reconcile the interrogation techniques with new legal developments, including Hamdan v. Rumsfeld, as well as intervening legislation such as the Military Commissions Act of 2006 and the December 2005 Detainee Treatment Act. The 2007 memo provided legal authorization and OLC approval for a more limited set of actions for use when interrogating high-value detainees. This approval encompassed six listed techniques, including temporary food deprivation (no less than 1,000 Calories/day), sleep deprivation by being forced to hold a "standing position for as many as four days", and several types of physical striking.

== Revised opinions, 2009 ==
Near the end of the Bush administration, Bradbury signed two memoranda for the files, explaining that during his tenure, OLC had determined that certain legal propositions previously stated in ten OLC opinions issued between 2001 and 2003 concerning executive power in the war on terror no longer reflected the views of OLC. His memos said the 10 earlier opinions "should not be treated as authoritative for any purpose" and further explained that some of the underlying opinions had been withdrawn or superseded and that "caution should be exercised" by the Executive Branch "before relying in other respects" on the other opinions that had not been superseded or withdrawn. On January 15, 2009 Memorandum Regarding Status of Certain OLC Opinions Issued in the Aftermath of the Terrorist Attacks of September 11, 2001, Steven G. Bradbury, Acting head of the OLC from 2005 to January 20, 2009, during the Bush administration, stated,

We have also previously expressed our disagreement with the specific assertions excerpted from the 8/1/02 Interrogation Opinion: The August 1, 2002, memorandum reasoned that "[a]ny effort by Congress to regulate the interrogation of battlefield combatants would violate the Constitution's sole vesting of the Commander-in-Chief authority in the President." I disagree with that view.

and further that

The federal prohibition on torture, 18 U.S.C. §§ 2340–2340A, is constitutional, and I believe it does apply as a general matter to the subject of detention and interrogation of detainees conducted pursuant to the President's Commander in Chief authority. The statement to the contrary from the August 1, 2002, memorandum, quoted above, has been withdrawn and superseded, along with the entirety of the memorandum, and in any event I do not find that statement persuasive. The President, like all officers of the Government, is not above the law. He has a sworn duty to preserve, protect, and defend the Constitution and to execute the laws of the United States faithfully, in accordance with the Constitution.

== President Obama's repudiation ==
Two days after taking office on January 20, President Barack Obama issued Executive Order 13491, which rescinded all the previous OLC guidance about "detention or the interrogation of detained individuals" and directed that no government agency may rely on any of the OLC opinions on that topic between 2001 and 2009. He had declared shortly before taking office "under my administration the United States does not torture."

In April 2009, Obama released redacted versions of the Torture Memos. Shortly afterward, he said that his administration would prosecute neither the authors of the memos nor those CIA or DoD personnel or contractors who carried out the acts described in them in the belief they were legal.

However, in August 2009, the Justice Department announced that those who had exceeded approved "techniques" might face prosecution. The investigation by DOJ of such actions continued into 2010.

== Responses ==
Bybee signed the legal memorandum that defined "enhanced interrogation techniques" (including waterboarding), which are now regarded as torture by the Justice Department, Amnesty International, Human Rights Watch, medical experts, intelligence officials, military judges, and American allies. In 2009, Spanish judge Baltasar Garzón considered conducting a war crime investigation against Bybee and five other Bush administration figures, but the Attorney General of Spain recommended against it. Bybee was, however, investigated by the Justice Department's Office of Professional Responsibility (see below).

Jack Goldsmith, who succeeded Bybee as head of the Office of Legal Counsel, withdrew the torture memos weeks before resigning in June 2004. He later said he was "astonished" by the "deeply flawed" and "sloppily reasoned" legal analysis in the memos.

David Luban, a law professor at Georgetown Law School, testified before Congress on May 13, 2009, stating that the memos were "an ethical train wreck" and had been drafted to "reverse engineer" a defense for illegal actions already committed.

=== OPR investigation ===
In 2009, the Justice Department's Office of Professional Responsibility reviewed the work of the principal author John Yoo, now a law professor at the University of California, Berkeley; and signatory Jay Bybee, now a federal judge, to determine whether the advice given "was consistent with the professional standards that apply to Department of Justice attorneys." John Yoo was later harshly criticized by the Department of Justice for failing to cite legal precedent and existing case law when drafting his memos. In particular, the 2009 DOJ report chastises Yoo for failing to cite Youngstown Sheet & Tube Co. v. Sawyer, a seminal 1952 case on the powers of the Executive in times of war. In its 261-page final report, the OPR concluded that the legal opinions that justified waterboarding and other interrogation tactics for use on Al Qaeda suspects in United States custody amounted to professional misconduct. The report said that Yoo in particular "knowingly failed to provide a thorough, objective, and candid interpretation of the law", and recommended referral of him to the Bar for disciplinary action.

However, in a memorandum dated January 5, 2010, to Attorney General Eric Holder, David Margolis, the top career Justice Department lawyer who advises political appointees, countermanded the recommended referral. While Margolis was careful to avoid "an endorsement of the legal work", which he said was "flawed" and "contained errors more than minor", he concluded that Yoo had exercised "poor judgment", which did not rise to the level of "professional misconduct" sufficient to authorize OPR to refer its findings to the state bar disciplinary authorities. Margolis's decision not to refer Yoo to the bar for discipline was criticized by numerous commentators.

On February 26, 2010, The New York Times reported that the Justice Department had revealed that numerous e-mail files were missing in relation to the decisions of that period and had not been available to the OPR investigation. These included most of Yoo's e-mail records, as well as a "month's worth of e-mail files from the summer of 2002 for Patrick Philbin, another political appointee Justice Department lawyer who worked on the interrogation opinions. Those missing e-mail messages came during a period when two of the critical interrogation memos were being prepared."

=== Criticism ===
The August 1, 2002, memo has been widely criticized, including within the Bush administration. Colin Powell, the secretary of state, strongly opposed the invalidation of the Geneva Conventions, while Alberto Mora, general counsel of the U.S. Navy, campaigned internally against what he saw as the "catastrophically poor legal reasoning" and dangerous extremism of Yoo's legal opinions.

In 2009, Philip D. Zelikow, the former State Department legal adviser to Condoleezza Rice, testified to the Senate Judiciary Committee,

It seemed to me that the OLC interpretation of U.S. constitutional law in this area was strained and indefensible. I could not imagine any federal court in America agreeing that the entire CIA program could be conducted and it would not violate the American constitution.

Zelikow alleged that Bush administration officials not only ignored his memos on the subject, but attempted to destroy them.

In June 2004, the memo was rescinded by Jack Goldsmith, who had been appointed in October 2003 to lead the OLC. He had earlier advised agencies not to follow the three August 2002 memos. He called the memo "deeply flawed" and "sloppily reasoned". In discussing the issues in 2007, after publishing his memoir about his service in the Bush administration, Goldsmith asserted that he "hadn't determined the underlying techniques were illegal". He continues, "I wasn't in the position to make an independent ruling on the other techniques. I certainly didn't think they were unlawful, but I couldn't get an opinion that they were lawful either."

In 2004, the journalist Robert Scheer asked if Bybee's appointment to a lifetime job as a federal judge was reward for writing the torture memo. In his column in the Los Angeles Times Scheer wrote, "Was it as a reward for such bold legal thinking that only months later Bybee was appointed to one of the top judicial benches in the country?" He wrote, "The Bybee memo is not some oddball exercise in moral relativism but instead provides the most coherent explanation of how this Bush administration came to believe that to assure freedom and security at home and abroad, it should ape the tactics of brutal dictators."

In 2005, testimony to Congress, Harold Hongju Koh, dean of the Yale Law School and former assistant secretary of state for democracy, human rights, and labor in the Bill Clinton administration, called the August 1, 2002 memo "perhaps the most clearly erroneous legal opinion I have ever read," which "grossly overreads the president's constitutional power." John Dean, the former Nixon White House counsel involved in the Watergate scandal, concluded in 2005 that the memo was tantamount to evidence of a war crime. He noted that, after the memo was leaked, "the White House hung Judge Bybee out to dry."

On March 9, 2006, after emerging from a closed talk at Harvard Law School sponsored by the student chapter of the Federalist Society, Bybee was confronted by around thirty-five protesters.

In October 2007, a former master instructor and chief of training for SERE published an opinion piece titled "Waterboarding is Torture . . . Period." His piece drew on his having "personally led, witnessed and supervised waterboarding of hundreds of people", explaining that the use of waterboarding in SERE was "designed to show how an evil totalitarian, enemy would use torture at the slightest whim."

Douglas Kmiec, a law professor at Pepperdine University, has stated that ultimately the memo "caused no long-term legal damage because it was redrafted and is not legally binding".

In March 2009, Baltasar Garzón, a Spanish judge who has considered international war crimes charges against other high-profile figures, considered whether to allow charges to be filed against Bybee and five other former officials of the George W. Bush administration. On April 17, 2009, Spain's Attorney General Cándido Conde-Pumpido issued a non-binding recommendation against the investigation.

On April 19, 2009, an editorial in The New York Times said that Bybee is "unfit for a job that requires legal judgment and a respect for the Constitution" and called for Bybee's impeachment from the federal bench. Friends of Bybee have indicated that the jurist privately regrets the controversial memo's inadequacies and growing notoriety. In response to the criticism, Bybee told The New York Times that his signing of the controversial opinions was "based on our good-faith analysis of the law." In addressing reports of his regrets, he said in the same article that he would have done some things differently, such as clarifying and sharpening the analysis of some of his answers, to help the public better understand in retrospect the basis for his conclusions.

In an April 25, 2009, Washington Post article, Patrick J. Leahy (D-VT), chairman of the Senate Judiciary Committee, is quoted: "If the Bush administration and Mr. Bybee had told the truth, he never would have been confirmed," adding that "the decent and honorable thing for him to do would be to resign [from the U.S. Court of Appeals for the 9th Circuit]". Four days later, Senator Leahy sent a letter to Judge Jay S. Bybee inviting him to testify before the Judiciary Committee in connection with his role in writing legal memoranda authorizing the use of harsh interrogation techniques while serving as the Assistant Attorney General of the Office of Legal Counsel (OLC). Bybee "declined to respond" to the letter.

Judge Betty Fletcher, a member of the United States Court of Appeals for the Ninth Circuit for thirty years until her death in 2012, is quoted from a statement regarding Bybee:

He is a moderate conservative, very bright and always attentive to the record and the applicable law. I have not talked to other judges about his memo on torture, but to me it seems completely out of character and inexplicable that he would have signed such a document.

== See also ==
- No blood, no foul, a phrase insinuating that as long as violence does not leave a mark, it is not prosecutable
- Panetta Review
- Senate Intelligence Committee report on CIA torture
- The Report (2019 film)
