= 2005 CIA interrogation videotapes destruction =

The CIA interrogation videotapes destruction occurred on November 9, 2005. The videotapes were made by the United States Central Intelligence Agency (CIA) during interrogations of al-Qaeda suspects Abu Zubaydah and Abd al-Rahim al-Nashiri in 2002 at a CIA black site prison in Thailand. Ninety tapes were made of Zubaydah and two of al-Nashiri. Twelve tapes depict interrogations using "enhanced interrogation techniques" — a euphemism for torture.

The tapes and their destruction became public knowledge in December 2007. A criminal investigation by a Department of Justice special prosecutor, John Durham, decided in 2010 to not file any criminal charges related to destroying the videotapes.

== Creation and destruction ==
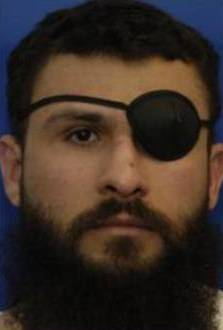
Abu Zubaydah, the subject of many of the videotapes.

Abu Zubaydah was held at a black site in Thailand starting in the spring of 2002. Near the beginning of Zubaydah's detention, a video camera was set up to continuously tape him. Tapes were also made of another early CIA detainee, Abd al-Rahim al-Nashiri, who arrived in October. The tapes were made from April to December 2002. Ninety tapes were made of Zubaydah and two of al-Nashiri. Twelve tapes depict interrogations using "enhanced interrogation" techniques, reportedly including Zubaydah "vomiting and screaming" during a waterboarding session.

Soon after the taping had stopped, CIA clandestine operation officers were pushing for the tapes to be destroyed. However, the general counsel of the CIA, Scott W. Muller, advised the CIA director, George Tenet, to not destroy the tapes on the CIA's authority. Instead, Muller notified the House and Senate Intelligence Committees in February 2003 that the CIA would like to have them destroyed. Representatives Porter Goss (who later served as CIA Director) and Jane Harman thought that would be politically and legally risky.

Days after the photographs from Abu Ghraib became public in May 2004, the CIA tapes were discussed among CIA and White House lawyers. Muller, representing the CIA, met with Alberto Gonzales, David Addington and John B. Bellinger III. The three White House lawyers recommended that the tapes not be destroyed.

Tenet and Muller left the CIA in mid-2004. By late 2004, several top leadership positions at the CIA had changed. Goss was Director, John A. Rizzo was acting general counsel, and Jose A. Rodriguez Jr. was chief of the Directorate of Operations. There was also a new White House counsel, Harriet Miers. In early 2005, Miers told Rizzo not to destroy the tapes without checking with the White House first.

On November 4, 2005, just after the Washington Post had printed a story about the existence of secret prisons run by the CIA in Eastern Europe, Rodriguez called two CIA lawyers for their opinions. Steven Hermes, a clandestine service lawyer, told Rodriguez he had the authority to destroy the tapes. Robert Eatinger, the top lawyer at the CIA Counterterrorism Center, said there was no legal requirement to keep the tapes. The AP reported that, as both lawyers knew of standing orders from the White House not to destroy the tapes, neither thought Rodriguez would immediately act based on their advice.

Rodriguez sent a cable to the CIA's Bangkok station ordering the destruction of the tapes on November 8, 2005. The cable was not copied to anyone other than Rodriguez's chief of staff. It was against standard procedure to act on the advice of agency lawyers without copying them on a decision. Rodriguez informed Goss and Rizzo on November 10, 2005. Rodriguez was never reprimanded for the destruction of the tapes. According to Rodriguez's memoir, Gina Haspel was responsible for "draft[ing] a cable" ordering the destruction.

== Requests for interrogation tapes ==
Beginning in 2003, lawyers for Zacarias Moussaoui asked for videotapes of interrogations of detainees that might help prove Moussaoui was not involved in the September 11 attacks.

In May 2005, Senator Jay Rockefeller made a request on behalf of the Senate Judiciary Committee for the CIA to turn over a hundred documents related to the alleged torture of prisoners in American custody. In September, after Porter Goss was named as the new Director of the CIA, Rockefeller renewed his request. Both times, he also mentioned the videotapes, which "undoubtedly sent a shiver through the agency".

From May to November 2005, Judge Leonie Brinkema was also pressuring the CIA to turn over any videotapes of detainee interrogations as evidence in the trial against Moussaoui. On November 14, the Department of Justice told the court that the CIA did not possess the videotapes that were requested.

The tapes were not provided to the 9/11 Commission, which used classified transcripts of interrogations of Zubaydah in writing its report. Philip D. Zelikow, the executive director of the Commission, stated, "We believe that we asked for such material and we are sure that we were not provided such material."

The ACLU claimed that at the time they were destroyed, the tapes should have been turned over according to a federal court order to comply with a FOIA request for information about interrogations. A federal judge ruled in 2011 that the CIA would not be sanctioned for the destruction.

== Making the destruction of the tapes public, December 2007 ==
On December 6, 2007, The New York Times advised the Bush administration that they had acquired, and planned to publish, information about the destruction of tapes made of Zubaydah's interrogation, believed to show instances of waterboarding and other forms of possible torture.

Michael Hayden, the Director of the CIA, sent a letter to CIA staff the next day, briefing them on the destruction of the tapes. Hayden asserted that key members of Congress had been briefed on the existence of the tapes, and the plans for their destruction. Senator Jay Rockefeller, the chair of the Senate Intelligence Committee, disputed Hayden's assertion, saying that he only learned of the destruction of the tapes in November 2006, a year after their destruction.

Jane Harman, the ranking Democrat on the House Intelligence Committee and one of just four senior members of Congress who was briefed on the existence of the tapes, acknowledged being briefed. Harman responded to Hayden's assertions by saying she had objected, in writing, to the tapes' destruction. "I told the CIA that destroying videotapes of interrogations was a bad idea and urged them in writing not to do it," Harman stated.

== Investigation ==
On December 8, 2007, the CIA Office of Inspector General and the Department of Justice announced a preliminary joint investigation into the destruction of videotapes of interrogations of the first two detainees in the CIA's custody. Attorney General Michael Mukasey announced the appointment of Connecticut federal prosecutor John Durham to start a criminal investigation of the destruction of the tapes on January 2, 2008. Hayden claimed that the continued existence of the tapes represented a threat to the CIA personnel involved, saying that if the tapes were leaked they might result in CIA personnel being identified and targeted for retaliation. Hayden stated that the tapes were destroyed "only after it was determined they were no longer of intelligence value and not relevant to any internal, legislative, or judicial inquiries." In February 2009, the Obama administration revealed that the CIA had destroyed ninety-two videotapes that contained hundreds of hours of the interrogations.

On November 8, 2010, Durham closed the investigation without recommending any criminal charges be filed.

== See also ==
- Panetta Review
- UN Convention Against Torture
- The Report (2019 film)
