= Panetta Review =

Internal review of the CIA's torture of detainees

The Panetta Review was a secret internal review conducted by Leon Panetta, then the director of the United States Central Intelligence Agency, of the CIA's torture of detainees during the administration of George W. Bush. The review led to a series of memoranda that, as of March 2014, remained classified. According to The New York Times, the memoranda "cast a particularly harsh light" on the Bush-era interrogation program, and people who have read them have said parts of the memos are "particularly scorching" of techniques such as waterboarding, which the memos describe as providing little valuable intelligence.

The existence of the review was revealed by Sen. Mark Udall (D-CO) during a hearing of the Senate Intelligence Committee on December 17, 2013. Udall said that the Panetta Review conflicted with the CIA's official response. Furthermore, Udall stated that the Panetta Review was consistent with "The Committee Study of the Central Intelligence Agency's Detention and Interrogation Program", a highly critical report generated by the Intelligence Committee.

A 525-page summary of the Senate Intelligence Committee's report was made public on December 9, 2014.

== Senate–CIA hacking dispute ==
In January 2014, CIA officials claimed that the Intelligence Committee had accessed review documents and removed them from CIA facilities in 2010 without CIA authorization. On March 11, 2014, Sen. Dianne Feinstein (D-CA), chairwoman of the Intelligence Committee, confirmed that copies of portions of the review had been removed and transferred to a safe in the Senate's Hart Office Building. She argued that the action was necessary to protect the documents from the CIA, which had destroyed videotapes depicting brutal interrogation methods in 2005.

During an "extraordinary" 45-minute speech on March 11, 2014, Feinstein said the CIA unlawfully searched the Intelligence Committee's computers to determine how the committee staff obtained the review documents. Feinstein also said that the CIA's acting general counsel, later identified as Robert Eatinger, requested the FBI conduct a criminal inquiry into the committee staff's behavior. She said she believed that the request was "a potential effort to intimidate [Intelligence Committee] staff." Eatinger had been one of two lawyers who approved the destruction of video tapes in 2005, and Feinstein added that Eatinger was mentioned by name over 1,600 times in the Committee's report. She promised to push for declassifying the committee report, which she said would reveal "the horrible details of the CIA program."

In response to Feinstein's speech, global surveillance leaker Edward Snowden said that it was "clear" the CIA was trying to play "keep away" with the Panetta Review, and he also compared Feinstein to German chancellor Angela Merkel for what he saw as hypocrisy for complaining about the CIA allegedly spying on the Senate Intelligence Committee while supporting mass surveillance programs by the National Security Agency.

In July 2014, a Justice Department spokesman confirmed that they would not be pursuing charges in the hacking incident. On July 31, 2014, the CIA confirmed that it had improperly gained access to the Senate Intelligence Committee's computer network via a report from its own Inspector General. CIA director John O. Brennan had previously denied this, adding, "When the facts come out on this, I think a lot of people who are claiming that there has been this tremendous sort of spying and monitoring and hacking will be proved wrong." However, a more thorough and lengthy review by an Independent Accountability Review Board came to the conclusion that there was no spying/hacking. The DOJ had agreed with this finding afterwards.

== See also ==
- 2005 CIA interrogation tapes destruction
- Senate Intelligence Committee report on CIA torture
- Torture memos
- Torture in the United States
- The Report (2019 film)
