= Michael Ellis (attorney) =

American lawyer (born 1984)

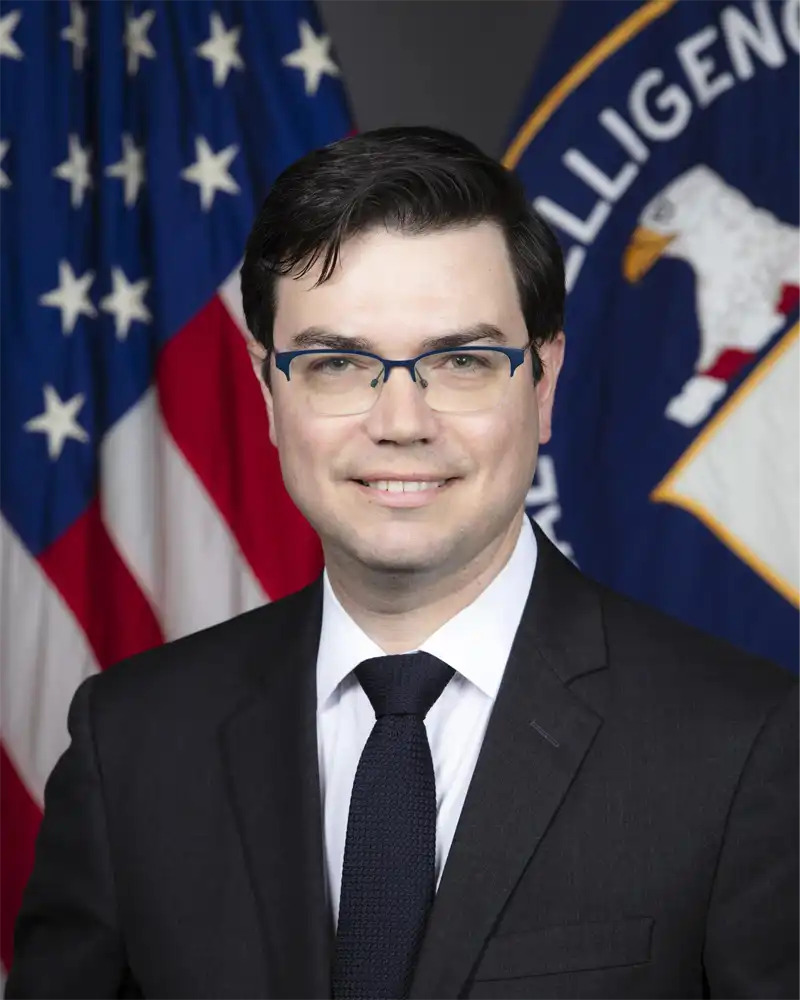
- Official portrait, 2025

9th Deputy Director of the Central Intelligence Agency
- Incumbent
- Assumed office February 10, 2025
- President: Donald Trump
- Preceded by: David Cohen

General Counsel of the Central Intelligence Agency
- Acting
- In office October 6, 2025 – January 8, 2026
- President: Donald Trump
- Preceded by: Kate Heinzelman
- Succeeded by: Joshua Simmons

Personal details
- Born: Michael Jay Ellis; September 1984 (age 42) Washington, D.C., U.S.
- Party: Republican
- Spouse: Katherine Racicot (m. 2011)
- Education: Dartmouth College (BA); Yale University (JD)

Military service
- Branch/service: United States Navy
- Rank: Lieutenant
- Unit: Navy Reserve

Michael Jay Ellis (born September 1984) is an American lawyer and political operative who has served as the deputy director of the Central Intelligence Agency since 2025. Ellis additionally served as the agency's general counsel from September 2025 to January 2026.

Ellis graduated from Dartmouth College in 2006 and from Yale Law School with a Juris Doctor in 2011. He clerked for judges Amul Thapar of the District Court for the Eastern District of Kentucky and Jeffrey Sutton of the Court of Appeals for the Sixth Circuit. Ellis additionally worked on the House Permanent Select Committee on Intelligence and later served as its general counsel. In March 2017, he became the senior associate counsel for national security issues at the Office of the White House Counsel and the deputy legal advisor of the National Security Council.

In March 2020, Ellis was appointed the senior director for intelligence programs at the National Security Council. In November, he was named as the general counsel of the National Security Agency. Amid concerns over his qualifications, Ellis was not sworn in and was placed on administrative leave after the inauguration of Joe Biden in January 2021. After resigning from the National Security Agency in April, he served as the general counsel for the video hosting company Rumble.

In February 2025, President Donald Trump appointed Ellis to serve as the deputy director of the Central Intelligence Agency. In September, the agency's director, John Ratcliffe, appointed him to serve as its general counsel.

== Early life and education ==
Michael Jay Ellis was born in September 1984 in Washington, D.C. Ellis's mother was a statistical consultant, while his father was a manager for Verizon overseeing federal government contracts. Ellis attended Richard Montgomery High School, where he participated in Model United Nations. Ellis graduated summa cum laude from Dartmouth College in 2006. He served as the editor-in-chief of The Dartmouth Review. Ellis worked in polling and strategy for president George W. Bush's 2004 re-election campaign. After graduating from Dartmouth, Ellis worked as an aide to California representative Devin Nunes. He served as an associate director of the White House Office of Strategic Initiatives from 2006 to 2007 and as the deputy director of strategy in Boston for Mitt Romney's 2008 presidential campaign from 2007 to 2008.

Ellis graduated from Yale Law School with a Juris Doctor in 2011. As a student, he wrote for The Yale Law Journal. In his final year, Ellis served as the president of Yale's chapter of the Federalist Society, expanding the organization to two hundred members. By that year, he had become a Lieutenant in the Navy Reserve and was named on the Forbes 30 Under 30 list for law and policy.

== Career ==
=== Early legal work (2011–2017) ===
Ellis clerked for judge Amul Thapar of the District Court for the Eastern District of Kentucky beginning in 2011 and had clerked for judge Jeffrey Sutton of the Court of Appeals for the Sixth Circuit. He worked on the House Permanent Select Committee on Intelligence by September 2012. He served as the committee's general counsel after Rogers was succeeded by Devin Nunes. Ellis was one of the principal staffers who helped compile the House Permanent Select Committee on Intelligence's report on the Snowden disclosures in 2016.

=== Trump administration positions (2017–2021) ===
In March 2017, Ellis became a senior associate counsel for national security issues at the Office of the White House Counsel and the deputy legal advisor of the National Security Council. That month, The New York Times identified Ellis as an individual in the White House who allowed Nunes, the chair of the House Permanent Select Committee on Intelligence, to access intelligence reports indicating president Donald Trump and his allies had been the incidental subjects of foreign surveillance by the United States.

In October 2019, Ellis was sent an interview request in the impeachment inquiry into Trump over the Trump–Ukraine scandal as the deputy to John Eisenberg, the legal advisor of the National Security Council. Eisenberg and Ellis discussed handling the transcript of a phone call between Trump and Ukrainian president Volodymyr Zelenskyy, according to Alexander Vindman; Ellis offered the suggestion that the call be restricted from access, though Vindman reserved that he did not believe Ellis had "malicious intent". He faced an investigation into allegations he retaliated against Vindman's brother, Eugene.

In March 2020, Ellis was appointed the senior director for intelligence programs at the National Security Council. Ellis's appointment occurred amid broad personnel shifts at the council and the Office of the Director of National Intelligence after his acquittal in his first impeachment trial. In May, he was assigned to review a manuscript of The Room Where It Happened (2020), a memoir by John Bolton, the former national security advisor. Ellis determined that the manuscript contained classified information, a claim that had been used to justify the Department of Justice's lawsuit blocking the book from being published. Ellis had no formal training in reviewing manuscripts.

=== National Security Agency appointment (November 2020–January 2021) ===
In November 2020, The Washington Post reported that Ellis had been named as the general counsel of the National Security Agency. The position was within the senior executive service, preventing staff involved in the presidential transition of Joe Biden from easily removing him. According to the Post, Paul C. Ney Jr., the general counsel of the department of defense, hired Ellis on orders from John McEntee, the director of the White House Presidential Personnel Office. By January 2021, Ellis had not completed administrative procedures to be able to take the position. On January 16, acting secretary of defense Christopher C. Miller ordered Paul Nakasone, the director of the National Security Agency, to install Ellis imminently; Nakasone opposed his appointment. On January 17, the National Security Agency stated that Ellis had accepted the position. Speaker of the House Nancy Pelosi sent Miller a letter urging him not to install Ellis, arguing that he was not qualified for the position. Hours after Joe Biden was sworn in, the Biden administration placed Ellis on leave. Ellis left the National Security Agency in April. Acting inspector general of the Department of Defense Sean O'Donnell determined in October that the Trump administration had not pressured the agency to appoint Ellis and that the National Security Agency should not have suspended Ellis.

=== Post-government activities (2021–2024) ===
In May 2021, Ellis joined The Heritage Foundation as a visiting fellow for law and technology. In December, he became the general counsel of the video hosting company Rumble. Ellis received US$1 million after leaving the company to serve as the deputy director of the Central Intelligence Agency.

== Deputy Director of the Central Intelligence Agency (2025–present) ==
In December 2024, Politico reported that Ellis was set to receive a position within the Central Intelligence Agency. The following month, Politico reported that President Donald Trump was set to appoint him to serve as the agency's general counsel. At the behest of Devin Nunes, Trump named Ellis as the deputy director of the Central Intelligence Agency on February 3. He was sworn in on February 10. He was the youngest person appointed as the agency's deputy director. In November, The Washington Post reported that the Central Intelligence Agency's director, John Ratcliffe, had appointed Ellis as the agency's acting general counsel in September. Joshua Simmons was confirmed as the general counsel of the Central Intelligence Agency in January 2026. After Tulsi Gabbard announced her resignation as the director of national intelligence in May, Ellis was among several candidates considered to succeed her, according to The Wall Street Journal.

== Views ==
In April 2022, Ellis co-wrote an article with Dustin Carmack advocating for going further in supporting Ukraine in the Russo-Ukrainian war, including utilizing the United States Cyber Command.

== Personal life ==
Ellis married Katherine Racicot in 2011, whom he had met at Dartmouth. He appeared on an episode of Jeopardy! (1984–present) that aired in April 2013; he won US$16,400 in his first appearance, but lost in the following episode. Ellis is a Claremont Fellow.

Government offices
Preceded by David Cohen	Deputy Director of the Central Intelligence Agency; 2025–present	Incumbent
