= Jeffrey H. Smith (lawyer) =

American lawyer

Assistant Legal Adviser for Law Enforcement and Intelligence at the United States Department of State
- In office 1975–1984

General Counsel of the Senate Armed Services Committee
- In office 1984–1988

9th General Counsel of the Central Intelligence Agency
- In office 1995–1996
- President: Bill Clinton
- Director: John M. Deutch
- Preceded by: Elizabeth Rindskopf Parker
- Succeeded by: Michael J. O'Neil

Personal details
- Born: 1944 or 1945
- Education: United States Military Academy at West Point; University of Michigan Law School

Jeffrey H. Smith was for most of his career a lawyer with the United States Government, working at the Judge Advocate General's Corps, the Department of State, the Senate Armed Services Committee, and the Central Intelligence Agency (CIA). He is presently a retired lawyer for the firm Arnold & Porter. In 2023, he was banned from the country of Russia. He is the 2024 winner of the National Law Journal's Lifetime Achievement Award.

== Life ==
On June 8, 1966, at his West Point graduation ceremony, Smith commissioned into the United States Army, joining the Infantry Branch. His father had been re-commissioned for the day so that he could administer the Oath of office to Smith.

While serving as an infantry officer, Smith earned his law degree from the University of Michigan Law School. After earning his law degree, Smith was commissioned into the United States Army Judge Advocate General's Corps (JAG).

While at JAG, Smith acted as the Pentagon's primary legal representative for the Panama Canal negotiations.

After a ten-year contract in the military, Smith went to work for the United States Department of State, where he acted as an Assistant Legal Adviser.

In 1984, Smith served as the General Counsel for the Senate Armed Services Committee, and later represented Senator Sam Nunn on the Iran/Contra Committee and the Senate Select Committee on Intelligence.

In 1988, Smith went into the private sector and joined the law firm of Arnold & Porter.

From 1995 to 1996, Smith served as the 9th General Counsel of the Central Intelligence Agency, running the CIA's Office of the General Counsel (OGC). During this time, Smith helped set up In-Q-Tel, the first publicly acknowledged CIA venture capital firm. This practice of public knowledge was a deviation from the earlier eras of the OGC, when Lawrence R. Houston and John S. Warner had organized shell companies to fund covert operations overseas.

After leaving the CIA, Smith returned to Arnold & Porter. Smith eventually became the Senior Counsel of the National Security & Government Contracts Practice at this firm, where he provided guidance to U.S. and international companies, as well as major universities, on various national security matters. His work involved advising leading defense and aerospace firms, as well as representing major media organizations and individuals on First Amendment issues and cases involving unauthorized disclosures of classified information. Throughout his career, Jeff also advised high-profile figures on public policy and national security concerns, including former Secretaries of State Henry Kissinger and Madeleine Albright, former Secretary of Defense Robert McNamara, retired Army General David Petraeus, and businesswoman Martha Stewart.

During the early 1990s, Jeff played a key role in the Clinton administration's transition at the Department of Defense. In 1993, he chaired the Joint Security Commission, which was created by Defense Secretary Les Aspin and CIA Director James Woolsey to assess security protocols within the defense and intelligence sectors and their contractors. Additionally, he contributed to the Commission on Roles and Missions of the Armed Services.

From 2020 to 2023, he served as Chair of the CIA Officers Memorial Foundation.

He has been actively involved in various organizations, serving on the Committee of Visitors at the University of Michigan Law School, as a trustee for the Aerospace Corporation, General Counsel for the Goldwater Foundation, and as a member of the Council on Foreign Relations. He frequently writes and speaks on topics related to national security and international law.

In 2023, Jeff was among approximately 250 Americans banned from traveling to Russia in response to U.S. sanctions restricting Russian travel to the United States.
