= Alberto J. Mora =

American lawyer

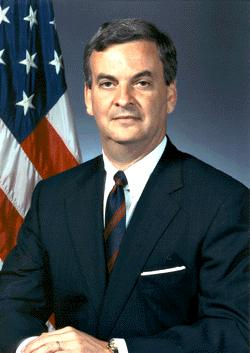
- Born: April 11, 1952 (age 74); Boston, Massachusetts, U.S.
- Education: Swarthmore College (BA); University of Miami (JD)
- Known for: former General Counsel of the Navy

Alberto José Mora (born April 11, 1952) is a former General Counsel of the Navy. He led an effort within the Defense Department to oppose the legal theories of John Yoo and to try to end the use of torture at Guantanamo Bay.

Mora is featured in two documentaries: the 2008 Academy Award-winning Taxi to the Dark Side and Torturing Democracy.

== Early life ==
Mora was born in Boston, Massachusetts and grew up in Cuba. His father, a medical doctor and professor, is Cuban, and his mother's parents are from Hungary, which they fled in advance of active Hungarian-German cooperation in 1941. Mora's family fled Cuba after the Cuban Revolution of 1959 when Mora was eight years old. Mora's family relocated to Jackson, Mississippi, where Mora lived until leaving for college. He received a B.A., with honors, from Swarthmore College in 1974.

== Career ==
From 1975 to 1978 he worked for the U.S. State Department as a foreign service officer at the U.S. embassy in Lisbon, Portugal. He left to enroll at the University of Miami School of Law, where he received his J.D. in 1981. He worked in litigation at a number of firms, until returning to government work. From 1989 to 1993, he served in the administration of President George H. W. Bush as general counsel to the United States Information Agency. He was later appointed three times by President Bill Clinton to the Broadcasting Board of Governors, which oversees the Voice of America and other U.S. information services. He also worked as an Of Counsel attorney with the prominent law firm of Greenberg Traurig, at their Washington office, focusing on matters of international law.

Mora speaks Spanish, French, and Portuguese. He is a member of the Council on Foreign Relations.

In 2001, President George W. Bush appointed Mora as the General Counsel of the Navy, the most senior civilian lawyer for the Navy, after a recommendation by former U.S. Secretary of Defense Frank Carlucci, who is friends with Mora.

Mora was in the Pentagon on September 11, 2001, when it was struck by the Boeing 757 of American Airlines Flight 77. Mora said that it "felt jarring, like a large safe had been dropped overhead."

Mora retired from the Federal Government in January 2006. He became the chief counsel for Wal-Mart's international division and later served as general counsel and secretary of Mars, Inc.

He served on the board of directors of Human Rights First.

In 2020, Mora, along with over 130 other former Republican national security officials, signed a statement that asserted that President Donald Trump was unfit to serve another term, and "To that end, we are firmly convinced that it is in the best interest of our nation that Vice President Joe Biden be elected as the next President of the United States, and we will vote for him."

== Campaign against torture at Guantanamo Bay ==
In December 2002, Mora received word from David Brant, director of the Naval Criminal Investigative Service (NCIS), that NCIS agents at the naval base at Guantánamo Bay, Cuba had learned that detainees being held there were being subjected to "physical abuse and degrading treatment" by members of the Joint Task Force 170 (JTF-170), and that authorization for this treatment had come from "a 'high level' in Washington". Mora reports that he was "disturbed" and felt he had to learn more.

Mora described his reaction to learning of the authorization for coercive interrogation techniques in these words:

To my mind, there's no moral or practical distinction [between cruelty and torture]. If cruelty is no longer declared unlawful, but instead is applied as a matter of policy, it alters the fundamental relationship of man to government. It destroys the whole notion of individual rights. The Constitution recognizes that man has an inherent right, not bestowed by the state or laws, to personal dignity, including the right to be free of cruelty. It applies to all human beings, not just in America—even those designated as 'unlawful enemy combatants.' If you make this exception, the whole Constitution crumbles. It's a transformative issue...
Besides, my mother would have killed me if I hadn't spoken up. No Hungarian after Communism, or Cuban after Castro, is not aware that human rights are incompatible with cruelty. The debate here isn't only how to protect the country. It’s how to protect our values."

=== Investigation of Joint Task Force techniques ===
Mora and Brant met with Rear Admiral Michael Lohr, the Judge Advocate General of the Navy, and Dr. Michael Gelles, the Chief Psychologist of the NCIS, and learned more about the Guantanamo interrogation practices, and determined that they were "unlawful and unworthy of the military services", and that they would investigate further.

Mora obtained a copy of a request by the commander of JT-170, Major General Michael Dunlavey, to Secretary of Defense Donald Rumsfeld for authorization to apply extraordinary interrogation techniques, including "stress positions, hooding, isolation, 'deprivation of light and auditory stimuli', and use of 'detainee-individual phobias (such as fear of dogs) to induce stress'"; a legal brief accompanying the request that supported the legality of such techniques, by the Senior Judge Advocate to JT-170, Lieutenant Colonel Diane Beaver; and an approval of the request by Rumsfeld. The legal brief held that "cruel, inhuman, or degrading treatment could be inflicted on the Guantanamo detainees with near impunity".

Mora found the brief to be "a wholly inadequate analysis of the law" and that the approved request was "fatally grounded on these serious failures of legal analysis" because it provided no bright line standard for what techniques would be prohibited; the techniques it approved "could produce effects reaching the level of torture"; and that "even if the techniques as applied did not reach the level of torture, they almost certainly would constitute 'cruel, inhuman, or degrading treatment'", and either way would be unlawful.

In the following weeks, Mora actively argued with a large number of the most senior lawyers and officials of the military and the Defense Department that the interrogation techniques that had been approved were unlawful. On January 15, 2003, he received word from William Haynes, the General Counsel of the Department of Defense, that Rumsfeld would be suspending the authority for the extraordinary interrogation techniques later that day. Mora was "delighted" and "reported the news widely".

=== Working Group and Yoo Memo ===
Two days later, Rumsfeld directed Haynes to establish a Working Group to develop a new set of guidelines for interrogation techniques, headed by Mary L. Walker, General Counsel of the Air Force. Mora worked actively to establish interrogation guidelines prohibiting coercive interrogation techniques, citing scientific evidence that they were ineffective, as well as legal arguments that they were unlawful.

However, early in the process, the Working Group was provided with a legal brief from the Department of Justice Office of Legal Counsel (OLC), and told they should follow its guidance. This was the same brief that later became infamous as the "Torture Memo", largely written by OLC deputy director John Yoo.

Mora regarded the OLC memo as lengthy and seemingly sophisticated, but otherwise identical to the Beaver brief he had already argued against. Mora argued against the conclusions of the OLC memo, arguing that the OLC memo was "fundamentally in error" and "virtually useless as guidance... and dangerous." With Walker's encouragement to share his views, he circulated an opposing draft memo, entitled "Proposed Alternative Approach to Interrogations".

But, according to Mora, contributions from members of the Working Group began to be rejected if they did not conform to what was already in the OLC memo, and Walker, the head of the Working Group, said of his arguments, "I disagree and moreover I believe [the General Counsel of the Defense Department] disagrees." Mora evaluated the work being prepared by the Working Group as containing "profound mistakes in its legal analysis" and as "unacceptable". Mora met with DOD General Counsel Haynes who disagreed with Mora's arguments.

Walker invited the author of the OLC memo, John Yoo, to meet with the senior DOD lawyers, both uniformed and civilian at the Pentagon, which Yoo did twice, explaining the cases in detail and the president's authority and responding to all questions. Mora met with Yoo, who defended the Justice Department's legal analysis, and told Mora the president had the authority to order the application of torture, not that he should but that the commander in chief had the authority to do so for the safety of the nation. Mora then met with Haynes, and advised him of his opinion that the Working Group's legal analysis, taken from the Department of Justice legal memorandum, was flawed, and should be put in a drawer and "never... see the light of day again." The Working Group never relied upon the extreme power of the commander in chief as the additional techniques they recommended did not approach what could be construed as torture. The Working Group voted unanimously to send forth the recommended techniques to Secretary Rumsfeld, who adopted the majority of them. The Administration later asked the Justice Department to review the adopted techniques, which they did, finding them consistent with law. John Yoo did not participate in the later analysis.

=== Aftermath ===
After that, Mora never saw a final report of the Working Group, and assumed that it had been abandoned. He learned otherwise only in May 2004, when he heard it referenced in televised reports on the Abu Ghraib scandal, and received confirmation from the deputy general counsel of the Air Force that a final draft of the Working Group's report had been signed out and delivered to the Joint Task Force Guantanamo commander, Major General Geoffrey Miller, who had also been subsequently sent to Abu Ghraib to "Gitmo-ize" it. Mora is a senior fellow at the Carr Center for Human Rights of the John F. Kennedy School of Government at Harvard University.

For his efforts, Mora was honored with the John F. Kennedy Profile in Courage Award in 2006, which is administered by the John F. Kennedy Library Foundation.

Government offices
Preceded by Stephen W. Preston; John E. Sparks (Acting); William Molzahn (Deputy GC)	General Counsel of the Navy; July 25, 2001 – January 1, 2006	Succeeded by Paul C. Ney, Jr. (Acting); Frank Jimenez
