= Daniel B. Silver =

Lawyer and General Counsel of the NSA and CIA

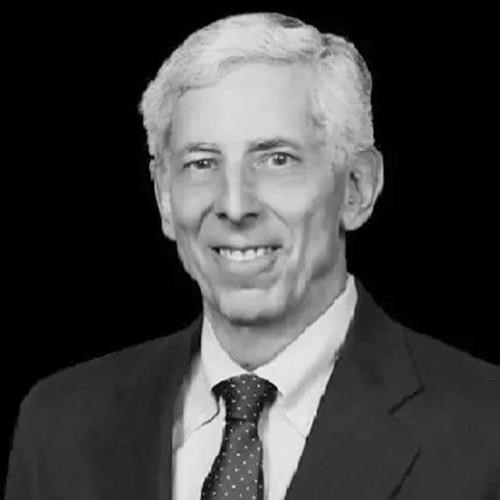

General Counsel of the National Security Agency
- In office March 1, 1978 – May 9, 1979
- President: Jimmy Carter
- Director: Bobby Ray Inman

4th General Counsel of the Central Intelligence Agency
- In office May 9, 1979 – February 4, 1981
- President: Jimmy Carter
- Director: Stansfield Turner
- Preceded by: Anthony Lapham
- Succeeded by: Stanley Sporkin

Personal details
- Born: August 14, 1941
- Died: September 26, 2022 (Aged 81)
- Education: Berkeley; Harvard University
- Awards: Intelligence Under Law Award

Daniel B. Silver was the 4th serving General Counsel of the Central Intelligence Agency and also served as General Counsel for the National Security Agency. He was also the author of a book called "Refuge In Hell."

== Life ==
Silver studied cultural anthropology at University of California, Berkeley. While at Berkeley, he was the editor of the student newspaper, and took a stand against McCarthyism. In the 1960s, he performed his anthropology fieldwork in Chiapas, Mexico. He co-authored an anthropological monograph on shamanism in the Mexican indigenous community that he studied.

At some point, Silver studied at Harvard University, where he earned a Law degree.

Later, Silver became a lawyer in International law, and practiced in Washington, D.C., Paris, and Brussels. At some point, he worked for was Cleary Gottlieb Steen & Hamilton.

Admiral Bobby R. Inman, then NSA Director, recruited Silver into the National Security Agency (NSA) from the private sector in 1978 as part of an effort to address concerns over intelligence agency misconduct highlighted by congressional investigations in the 1970s. Silver played a crucial role in guiding the NSA through a new phase of heightened oversight from both Congress and the Executive Branch. He was instrumental in shaping significant legislation, including the Foreign Intelligence Surveillance Act and the Classified Information Procedures Act.

After his service at the NSA, Silver was transferred to the Central Intelligence Agency (CIA), where he took over the position from Anthony Lapham. Silver had a difficult time contending with the wake of the Iran–Contra affair, and noted that "a General Counsel could be bred and trained who would be somewhere between a watchdog and a lapdog."
