= Elizabeth Rindskopf Parker =

American attorney

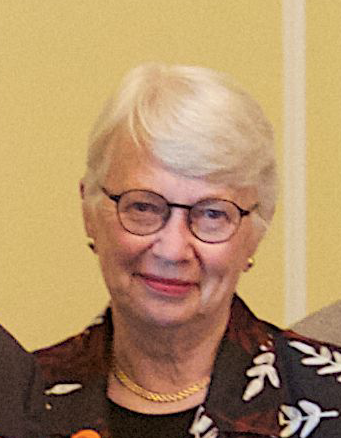

General Counsel of the National Security Agency
- In office June 1984 – June 1989

Principal Deputy Legal Adviser at the U.S. Department of State
- In office June 1989 – April 1990

8th General Counsel of the Central Intelligence Agency
- In office April 1990 – March 1995
- President: George H. W. Bush; Bill Clinton
- Directors: William H. Webster; Robert Gates; James Woolsey
- Preceded by: Russell J. Bruemmer
- Succeeded by: Jeffrey H. Smith

Personal details
- Education: University of Michigan

Elizabeth Rindskopf Parker is an attorney with experience in national security, education, and public service. She has served as the General Counsel of the National Security Agency, the Principal Deputy Legal Adviser at the U.S. Department of State, and as the 8th General Counsel of the Central Intelligence Agency.

== Life ==
Parker earned both her undergraduate and Juris Doctor degrees from the University of Michigan.

Parker's legal career began as a Reginald Heber Smith Fellow at Emory University School of Law. She later served as the Director of the New Haven Legal Assistance Association.

In the 80's and 90's, Parker worked as a government lawyer.

Following her government service, Parker became the General Counsel for the University of Wisconsin System. She then served as Dean of the McGeorge School of Law at the University of the Pacific from 2002 to 2012, where she was instrumental in establishing the Journal of National Security Law and Policy.

Parker also served as the executive director of the State Bar of California from 2015 to 2017, where she worked to bring stability to the organization.

Throughout her career, Parker has been actively involved in various professional organizations. She is a lifetime counselor to the American Bar Association's Standing Committee on Law and National Security, a member of the Council on Foreign Relations, and has served on the advisory board of the Reiss Center on Law and Security at NYU School of Law.

In recent years, Parker has focused on promoting civic education as a means to strengthen national security. She co-presented testimony before the National Commission on Military, National, and Public Service, emphasizing the importance of civic education in fostering an informed and engaged citizenry.

Currently, Parker serves as a non-resident senior adviser with the Defending Democratic Institutions Project at the Center for Strategic and International Studies (CSIS), contributing her expertise to initiatives aimed at safeguarding democratic values and institutions.
