= David P. Doherty =

American lawyer

Assistant Director of the Enforcement Division at the Securities and Exchange Commission
- In office 1972–1983
- Appointed by: Stanley Sporkin

6th General Counsel of the Central Intelligence Agency
- In office 1985 – January 13, 1988
- Directors: William J. Casey; William H. Webster
- Preceded by: Stanley Sporkin
- Succeeded by: Russell J. Bruemmer

Officer of the Enforcement Division at the New York Stock Exchange
- In office 1988–2004
- Appointed by: Ed Kwalwasser

Personal details
- Born: 1940 or 1941 Massachusetts, U.S.
- Education: Saint Michael's College; Georgetown University Law Center

David P. Doherty was an American lawyer who practiced Financial law at the U.S. Securities and Exchange Commission (SEC) and the New York Stock Exchange (NYSE), and was the 6th General Counsel of the Central Intelligence Agency (CIA).

== Life ==
In 1962, Doherty earned his bachelor's degree from St. Michaels College. In 1965, Doherty earned his law degree from Georgetown University Law Center.

Immediately afterward, Doherty began his legal career down the street at the Securities and Exchange Commission (SEC). He started at SEC as a trial lawyer in the Washington Regional Office, where he was involved in various enforcement activities, including inspections and legal proceedings against firms violating securities laws. One notable case involved prosecuting three over-the-counter broker-dealers accused of stock manipulation, which he successfully litigated despite facing a team of prominent defense attorneys. His work in the regional office led to his transfer to the SEC's headquarters, where he contributed to the development of a national enforcement program under Stanley Sporkin. Recognizing the need for specialized legal expertise, Sporkin established a dedicated trial unit to handle complex cases, and Doherty was among the initial members of this team, focusing on high-profile enforcement actions, becoming the assistant director of the SEC Enforcement Division.

When Sporkin became the 5th General Counsel at the Central Intelligence Agency (CIA), Doherty remained at the SEC for two years, until Sporkin recruited Doherty into the CIA to become an Associate General Counsel.

In 1985, after Sporkin became a Judge, Doherty took his place as the 6th General Counsel of the CIA. Doherty served as the General Counsel until 1988.

In 1988, Doherty joined the New York Stock Exchange (NYSE). During his tenure, he held the position of Senior Vice President and later Executive Vice President of the NYSE Enforcement Division, where he was responsible for overseeing investigations and prosecutions of violations related to federal securities laws and NYSE regulations. He managed a team of approximately 100 attorneys, handling over 230 cases annually. Doherty continued in this role until his retirement in 2004, culminating a 16-year career at the NYSE.
