= Daniel King =

Daniel King may refer to:

- Daniel P. King (1801–1850), U.S. Representative from Massachusetts
- Danny King (speedway rider) (born 1986), motorcycle speedway rider from the United Kingdom
- Daniel King (chess player) (born 1963), English chess grandmaster
- Danny King (author) (born 1969), English author of The Burglar Diaries
- Daniel King (cryptanalyst), United States Navy cryptanalyst who first confessed to, and then recanted, spying on the USA
- Daniel King (racewalker) (born 1983), British racewalker
- Daniel King (cricketer, born 1784) (1784–1836), English cricketer
- Daniel King (cricketer, born 1983), Australian cricketer and classicist

== See also ==
- Dan King (disambiguation)
