= Michael J. O'Neil =

American lawyer

Chief Counsel to the House Permanent Select Committee on Intelligence
- In office 1977–1989

Counsel to the Speaker of the U.S. House of Representatives
- In office 1989–1994
- Speaker: Tom Foley

Counselor to the Secretary and Deputy Secretary of Defense
- In office 1995

10th General Counsel of the Central Intelligence Agency
- In office 1997–2001
- President: Bill Clinton
- Director: George Tenet
- Preceded by: Jeffrey H. Smith
- Succeeded by: John A. Rizzo

Personal details
- Awards: Distinguished Intelligence Medal

Michael J. O'Neil served as the General Counsel of the Central Intelligence Agency (CIA) from 1997 to 2001. Prior to his tenure at the CIA, O'Neil was the Chief Counsel to the House Permanent Select Committee on Intelligence from 1977 to 1989 and served as Counsel to Speaker of the U.S. House of Representatives, Thomas S. Foley, from 1989 to 1994. He also held the position of Counselor to the Secretary and Deputy Secretary of Defense in 1995. After O'Neil's departure in 2001, John A. Rizzo served as Acting General Counsel until a permanent appointment was made.
