= Michael Gelles =

American forensic psychologist

- Occupation: forensic psychologist
- Known for: Helped uncover abusive interrogation in Guantanamo

Michael Gelles is an American forensic psychologist. He is notable for the role he played in uncovering the unauthorized use of abusive techniques during the interrogation of captives held in extrajudicial detention, apprehended during the "war on terror".

Gelles was chief forensic psychologist for the Naval Criminal Investigative Service (NCIS) in 2002 when he and other senior NCIS officials learned of the unauthorized use of extended techniques on Guantanamo captive Mohammed Al Qahtani, one of the suspected 20th hijackers, who was subjected to 58 days of sleep deprivation. Gelles was interviewed for the film Torturing Democracy. Selections from the interviews appeared in the film where Gelles described how he and his boss at NCIS, Alberto J. Mora, and their colleagues learned of the use of abusive interrogation techniques, and their reactions.

Prior to his service with the NCIS Gelles was an officer in the United States Navy Medical Corps. In 1991 he was a lieutenant commander.

Gelles has faced criticism for his role in the treatment of United States Navy First Class Petty Officer Daniel King, in 1999. Gelles was called in when King had been held without charge, and subjected to 29 days of sleep deprivation, when he told interrogators he was feeling suicidal and requested the help of a mental health professional. According to King's lawyers their confused and disoriented client's false confession was triggered, in part, due to advice from Gelles that he would feel better once he had confessed.
