= Caroline D. Krass =

American lawyer (born 1968)

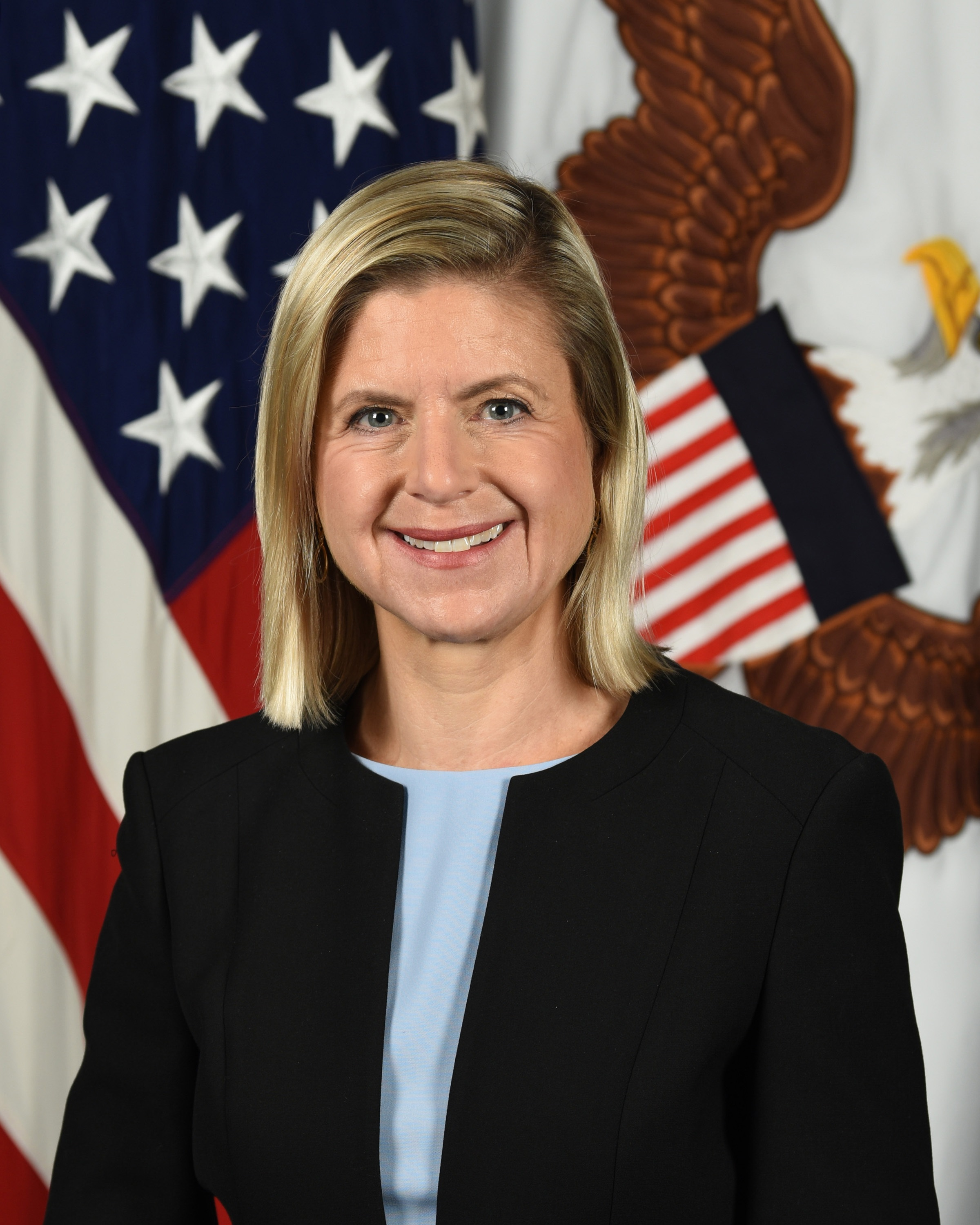

General Counsel of the Department of Defense
- In office August 2, 2021 – January 20, 2025
- President: Joe Biden
- Preceded by: Paul C. Ney Jr.
- Succeeded by: Earl G. Matthews

General Counsel of the Central Intelligence Agency
- In office March 13, 2014 – May 2017
- President: Barack Obama; Donald Trump
- Preceded by: Robert Eatinger (acting); Stephen W. Preston
- Succeeded by: Courtney Simmons Elwood

United States Assistant Attorney General for the Office of Legal Counsel
- Acting
- In office January 2011 – September 2011
- President: Barack Obama
- Preceded by: Jonathan Cedarbaum
- Succeeded by: Virginia A. Seitz

Personal details
- Born: Caroline Diane Krass; January 5, 1968 (age 58) Santa Barbara, California, U.S.
- Spouse: William Passmore
- Education: Stanford University (BA); Yale University (JD)

Caroline Diane Krass (born January 5, 1968) is an American attorney and government official who had served as the General Counsel of the Department of Defense.

Krass was a partner at the Washington office of the Los Angeles–based law firm Gibson Dunn (formerly Gibson, Dunn & Crutcher). She served as General Counsel for the Central Intelligence Agency from 2014 to 2017, and prior to that as Principal Deputy Assistant Attorney General for the Office of Legal Counsel, and briefly as the Acting Assistant Attorney General at the United States Department of Justice. She has also been a lawyer in the State Department, the Treasury Department, United States National Security Council, and the Office of the United States Attorney for the District of Columbia.

== Early life and education ==
Krass was born in Santa Barbara, California. She received her B.A. from Stanford University in 1989, where she was elected to Phi Beta Kappa. She went on to study at Yale Law School, serving as an editor of the Yale Law Journal and receiving her J.D. in 1993.

== Career ==
Krass clerked for Judge Patricia Wald on the United States Court of Appeals for the District of Columbia Circuit from 1993 to 1994. She then served as an attorney-advisor at the Office of the Legal Adviser of the Department of State from 1994 to 1996. She subsequently served various roles as a lawyer in the Department of the Treasury, the National Security Council, and the Office of Legal Counsel of the Department of Justice. She also served as a Special Assistant United States Attorney for the District of Columbia from 2007 to 2009, as well as a Special Advisor to the President of the United States on National Security Issues before becoming the Principal Deputy Assistant Attorney General for the Office of Legal Counsel.

President Barack Obama nominated Krass to replace Robert Eatinger as the General Counsel for the Central Intelligence Agency. On March 13, 2014, after a heated confirmation debate, the Senate confirmed Krass in a 95–4 vote for the position.

On May 8, 2017, Gibson Dunn announced that Krass had joined the firm's Washington, D.C. office as a partner.

Krass joined insurance company AIG in 2018, serving as its Senior Vice President and General Counsel, General Insurance, and Deputy General Counsel, AIG.

President Joe Biden nominated Krass to the position of General Counsel of the Department of Defense on April 28, 2021. The Senate's Armed Forces Committee held hearings on her nomination on June 16, 2021. Krass' nomination was favorably reported by the committee on June 22, 2021. The Senate confirmed the nomination by a voice vote on July 22, 2021. She was sworn in on August 2, 2021.

In 2025, she was named executive vice president and general counsel of Hilton Worldwide.

Legal offices
Preceded by Robert Eatinger	General Counsel of the Central Intelligence Agency; 2014–2017	Succeeded by Courtney Simmons Elwood
Preceded by Paul C. Ney Jr.	General Counsel of the Department of Defense; 2021–present	Incumbent
