= John A. Rizzo =

American attorney (1947–2021)

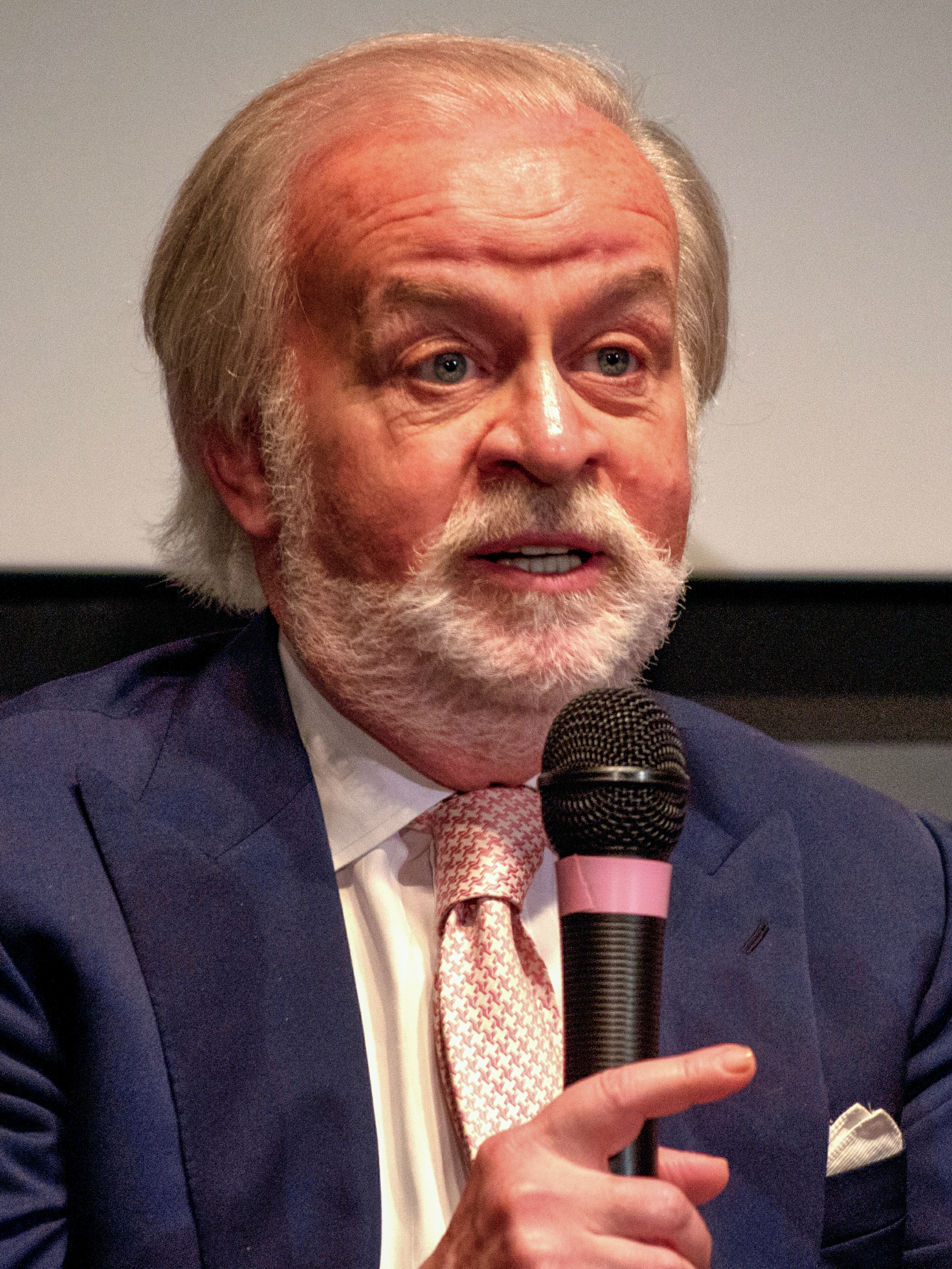

Acting General Counsel of the Central Intelligence Agency
- In office 2001–2002
- Preceded by: Michael J. O'Neil
- Succeeded by: Scott W. Muller

Deputy General Counsel of the Central Intelligence Agency
- In office 2002–2004
- Serving under: Scott W. Muller

Acting General Counsel of the Central Intelligence Agency
- In office 2004–2009
- Preceded by: Scott W. Muller
- Succeeded by: Stephen W. Preston

Personal details
- Born: John Anthony Rizzo; October 6, 1947 Boston, Massachusetts, U.S.
- Died: August 6, 2021 (aged 73)
- Spouses: Priscilla Walton Layton (divorced) Sharon Knight (m. 1993; died 2021)
- Education: Brown University (BA); George Washington University (JD)

John Anthony Rizzo (October 6, 1947 – August 6, 2021) was an American attorney who worked as a lawyer in the Central Intelligence Agency for 34 years. He was the deputy counsel or acting general counsel of the CIA for the first nine years of the war on terror, during which the CIA held dozens of detainees in black site prisons around the globe.

During the George W. Bush administration, the Office of Legal Counsel in the Department of Justice approved various forms of torture (referred to as "enhanced interrogation techniques") in memos to Rizzo for use by CIA interrogators at the black sites. Rizzo signed off on all CIA-directed drone strikes from September 2001 until October 2009.

He was a visiting fellow at the Hoover Institution and Senior Counsel at the Steptoe & Johnson law firm.

== Early life and education ==
Rizzo was born in Boston on October 6, 1947. His father, Arthur, worked as an executive at a department store, and his mother, Frances (McLaughlin), was a housewife. He studied political science at Brown University, graduating with a bachelor's degree in 1969. He was a member of the fraternity Beta Theta Pi. Due to a kidney stone, he was dismissed from the Vietnam War draft, an event he later described as "the happiest day of my life up to that time." He earned a Juris Doctor from George Washington University Law School, from which he graduated with honors in June 1972.

== Career ==
Rizzo's first job out of law school was at the Treasury Department, where he started work in the Customs Service in August 1972.

=== CIA service ===
Rizzo was hired at the CIA in 1976, just after the Church Committee released its report on the assassination of foreign leaders. By 1979, Rizzo became the staff lawyer for the Directorate of Operations, the CIA's clandestine branch. He served as the liaison between the CIA and the congressional investigators studying the Iran-Contra affair in the 1980s. Rizzo became Acting General Counsel of the CIA in November 2001, a position that was traditionally filled by someone from outside the agency.

Rizzo was the Acting General Counsel of the CIA from late 2001 to late 2002 and from mid-2004 until late 2009. He was Deputy General Counsel in the interim period from 2002 to 2004, while Scott Muller was General Counsel.

The Bush administration nominated Rizzo as General Counsel of the CIA in mid-2007, but Democratic Senator Ron Wyden (OR) blocked his confirmation by the Senate Intelligence Committee. Wyden opposed Rizzo due to his involvement in approving the CIA's interrogation practices during the war on terror, which included torture. The Bush administration withdrew his nomination, but kept Rizzo as Acting General Counsel until his retirement in October 2009.

Sabrina De Sousa says Rizzo was one of the CIA officials that approved the extraordinary rendition of Hassan Mustafa Osama Nasr, also known as Abu Omar, from Milan, Italy, to a prison in Egypt. Nasr was held for four years and says he was tortured.

Rizzo received the Thomas C. Clark Award from the Federal Bar Association and the Distinguished Career Intelligence Medal, the highest recognition awarded to a career CIA officer.

==== Enhanced interrogation techniques ====
The Joint Personnel Recovery Agency, which ran the U.S. military's SERE program to train U.S. personnel to resist harsh interrogation methods, issued a memo with an attachment written to the General Counsel of the Department of Defense in July 2002. The memo, which was passed on from the Pentagon to Rizzo, referred to the use of extreme duress on detainees as "torture" and warned that it would produce "unreliable information." Due to concerns about potential exposure to criminal liability in connection with the mistreatment of detainees, Rizzo requested a letter from the Department of Justice stating they would "declin[e] to prosecute future activity that might violate federal law." Rizzo's request was "flatly refused."

Rizzo sent a request to the Department of Justice's Office of Legal Counsel for an opinion as to whether certain interrogation techniques would violate the prohibition against torture. The OLC issued a memo signed by Jay S. Bybee to Rizzo on August 1, 2002; this was the first of what became known as the Torture Memos, in which the Justice Department authorized specific techniques to be used in interrogations. It approved 10 techniques, including waterboarding. Rizzo concurred on the legality of these techniques and saw to it that they were implemented by the CIA.

Rizzo traveled with David Addington, the Vice President's chief of staff; William Haynes, General Counsel of the Department of Defense; and Michael Chertoff, then the head of the Criminal Division of the Department of Justice, to consult with officers at the Guantanamo Bay detention camp in late September 2002. One week later, a CIA lawyer told personnel with the military intelligence interrogation team at Guantanamo that, "if the detainee dies, you're doing it wrong."

In 2005, CIA lawyers reviewed copies of videotapes made during interrogation of detainees and expressed their concerns to Rizzo. He requested the OLC to issue new statements about the legality of the enhanced interrogation techniques. The Los Angeles Times reported that Rizzo was becoming "increasingly anxious in the years after the Sept. 11 attacks that agency employees were being pressured to use methods that might later place them in legal jeopardy." The OLC issued three memos, signed by Steven G. Bradbury, then head of OLC, in May 2005 that stated the techniques did not violate the Convention Against Torture, as ratified by the United States in 1994. Later in 2005, Rizzo traveled with other CIA officials, including Kyle Foggo, to several black sites, to assure CIA employees that their interrogation activities were legal. The CIA destroyed most of the detainee interrogation videotapes in 2005, a decision which dismayed Rizzo because it was done without his input.

Based on advice from Rizzo, then CIA director Porter Goss halted the CIA interrogation program conducted at black sites in late 2005. The United States Supreme Court ruled in Hamdan v. Rumsfeld (2006) that the military commissions and Combatant Status Review Panels were unconstitutional because they were not authorized by Congress and also that they deprived detainees of due process and protections under other laws. After that decision, Rizzo told his colleagues that the program was becoming increasingly difficult to maintain. With the likely passage of the Military Commissions Act of 2006, which authorized the administration's plan for a military court at Guantanamo outside the existing federal and military justice systems, the CIA transferred the fourteen high-value detainees to military custody at the Guantanamo Bay detention camp.

By the 2008 presidential election, considerable material had been revealed by the press, civil law suits brought by civil liberties organizations and a Congressional investigation about the interrogation practices of the Bush administration. During the campaign, Barack Obama had vowed to change the government's approach, namely to prohibit torture, end the practice of extraordinary rendition and end the use of black sites. On January 21, 2009, one day before Obama was scheduled to sign Executive Order 13491 prohibiting the torture of detainees (so-called "enhanced interrogation techniques") and banning the use of CIA black sites, Rizzo contacted the White House counsel, Gregory Craig. Rizzo told Craig that the current language would not allow the CIA to hold people for a day or two in transit during ordinary rendition. The language was changed so that CIA had authority to hold people "on a short-term, transitory basis."

After the release of the Senate Intelligence Committee report on CIA torture on December 9, 2014, Rizzo admitted that the CIA did engage in torture, which he defined as practices not authorized by legal memos sent to him by the Justice Department.

In 2015, Human Rights Watch called for the investigation of Rizzo "for conspiracy to torture as well as other crimes."

==== Videotapes of early interrogation sessions at black site ====
In early 2005, White House Counsel Harriet Miers told Rizzo not to destroy the tapes without checking with the White House first. Jose A. Rodriguez Jr., the chief of the Directorate of Operations, sent a cable to the CIA's Bangkok station ordering the destruction of the tapes on November 8, 2005. Rodriguez informed Goss and Rizzo of the destruction on November 10.

==== Drone strike targeting ====
Rizzo signed off on all CIA-directed drone strikes from the start of the program soon after September 11, 2001 until his retirement in October 2009. He says he saw one "request for approval for targeting for lethal operation" per month and that roughly 30 individuals were targeted at any given time.

In July 2011, the human rights group Reprieve and Pakistani lawyers called for the prosecution of Rizzo in Pakistan for murder for approving drone attacks that killed hundreds of people. In April 2015, the Islamabad High Court ordered police to open a criminal case against Rizzo and former CIA Islamabad station chief Jonathan Bank for murder, conspiracy, terrorism and waging war against Pakistan.

In November 2011, the National Journal cited unnamed sources in reporting that the Department of Justice had opened an investigation of Rizzo for improperly disclosing classified information about the CIA drone program. The probe was first opened by Rizzo's former office, the General Counsel of the CIA, in March 2011 after a detailed interview Rizzo gave Newsweek. The General Counsel's office forwarded its collection of evidence to the DOJ that spring.

== Personal life ==
Rizzo's first marriage was to Priscilla Walton Layton. Together, they had a son named James. After their divorce, Rizzo married Sharon Knight in 1993. They remained married for 28 years until her death in April 2021.

Rizzo died on August 6, 2021, at his home in Washington, D.C., following a heart attack, aged 73.

== Works ==
- Company Man: Thirty Years of Controversy and Crisis in the CIA. Simon and Schuster. January 7, 2014. ISBN 978-1-4516-7395-1.
