= General Counsel of the Central Intelligence Agency =

Chief legal officer of the Central Intelligence Agency

- Seal of the Central Intelligence Agency

- Flag of the Central Intelligence Agency
- Central Intelligence Agency Office of General Counsel
- Abbreviation: D/OGC
- Reports to: Director of the Central Intelligence Agency
- Seat: George Bush Center for Intelligence, Langley, Fairfax County, Virginia
- Nominator: President of the United States
- Appointer: with Senate advice and consent
- Term length: No fixed term
- Precursor: General Counsel of the Central Intelligence Group
- Formation: 1947
- First holder: Lawrence R. Houston
- Website: www.cia.gov

The General Counsel of the Central Intelligence Agency serves as the agency’s chief legal officer, responsible for overseeing all legal matters related to Central Intelligence Agency (CIA) operations, policies, and activities. The position ensures that the agency operates within U.S. law, executive orders, and applicable international legal frameworks while fulfilling its national security mission. This person also acts as the Chief of the Office of General Counsel (OGC), and oversees the staff of this office. The General Counsel is also often referred to as "the CIA's Lawyer."

== List of General Counsels of the Central Intelligence Agency ==
The longest serving General Counsel to date was also the first to hold the office, Larry Houston, who held the office for over 26 years, and alongside his lifelong Deputy General Counsel, John S. Warner, also helped write many of the laws that established the office itself.

In 1996, Congress amended the Central Intelligence Agency Act of 1949 to require that the CIA's General Counsel be appointed by the President with the advice and consent of the Senate. This legislative change aimed to enhance accountability and strengthen oversight of the CIA's legal affairs. While Jeffrey H. Smith served as General Counsel from 1995 to 1996, his appointment did not require Senate confirmation.

Following Smith's tenure as General Counsel of the CIA from 1995 to 1996, the position became subject to Senate confirmation due to legislative changes in 1996. The first individual to be nominated and confirmed under this new requirement was Scott W. Muller, who served as General Counsel from 2002 to 2004. Between 1996 and 2002, John A. Rizzo served as Acting General Counsel, but his formal nomination in 2007 was withdrawn before confirmation.

No.	Portrait	Name	Term of office			Director(s)	President(s)	Ref.
No.	Portrait	Name	Took office	Left office	Time in office	Director(s)	President(s)	Ref.
1		Larry Houston	Establishment of CIA	1973	Over 26 years	Roscoe H. Hillenkoetter Walter Bedell Smith Allen Dulles John A. McCone William F. Raborn Richard Helms	Harry S. Truman Dwight D. Eisenhower John F. Kennedy Lyndon B. Johnson Richard Nixon	
2		John S. Warner	1973	1976	Approx. 3 years	James R. Schlesinger William Colby	Richard Nixon Gerald Ford	
3		Anthony A. Lapham	June 1, 1976	May 9, 1979	1072 days	George H.W. Bush Stansfield Turner	Gerald Ford Jimmy Carter	
4		Daniel B. Silver	May 9, 1979	February 4, 1981	637 days	Stansfield Turner	Jimmy Carter	
5		Stanley Sporkin	1981	1985	Approx. 4 years	William J. Casey	Ronald Reagan	
6		David P. Doherty	1985	January 13, 1988	Approx. 3 years	William J. Casey William H. Webster	Ronald Reagan	
7		Russell J. Bruemmer	January 16, 1988	April 16, 1990	821 days	William H. Webster	Ronald Reagan George H. W. Bush	
8		Elizabeth Rindskopf Parker	April 1990	March 1995	Approx. 5 years	William H. Webster Robert Gates James Woolsey	George H. W. Bush Bill Clinton	
9		Jeffrey H. Smith	1995	1996	Approx. 1 year	John M. Deutch	Bill Clinton	
10		Michael J. O'Neil	1997	2001	Approx. 4 years	George Tenet	Bill Clinton	
—		John A. Rizzo Acting	2001	2002	Approx. 1 year	George Tenet	Bill Clinton	
11		Scott W. Muller	2002	2004	Approx. 2 years	George Tenet	George W. Bush	
—		John A. Rizzo Acting	2004	2009	Approx. 5 years	Porter Goss Michael Hayden	George W. Bush	
12		Stephen W. Preston	July 2009	October 25, 2013	Approx. 4 years	Leon Panetta David Petraeus John Brennan	Barack Obama	
—		Robert Eatinger Acting	October 25, 2013	March 13, 2014	139 days	John Brennan	Barack Obama	
13		Caroline D. Krass	March 13, 2014	May 2017	Approx. 3 years	John Brennan Mike Pompeo	Barack Obama Donald Trump	
14		Courtney Simmons Elwood	June 6, 2017	January 20, 2021	1689 days	Mike Pompeo Gina Haspel	Donald Trump	
15		Kate Heinzelman	July 14, 2022	January 20, 2025	921 days	William J. Burns	Joe Biden	
—		Giovanni Price Acting	January 20, 2025	October 6, 2025	259 days	Tom Sylvester John Ratcliffe	Donald Trump	
—		Michael Ellis Acting	October 6, 2025	January 8, 2026	94 days	John Ratcliffe	Donald Trump	
16		Joshua Simmons	January 8, 2026	Present		John Ratcliffe	Donald Trump	

== See also ==
- CIA's relationship with the United States Congress
- CIA's relationship with the United States Military
