= June Lazenby Green =

American judge

Senior Judge of the United States District Court for the District of Columbia
- In office January 15, 1984 – February 2, 2001

Judge of the United States District Court for the District of Columbia
- In office June 7, 1968 – January 15, 1984
- Appointed by: Lyndon B. Johnson
- Preceded by: Burnita Shelton Matthews
- Succeeded by: Stanley Sporkin

Personal details
- Born: January 23, 1914 Arnold, Maryland, U.S.
- Died: February 2, 2001 (aged 87) Arnold, Maryland, U.S.
- Education: Washington College of Law (J.D.)

June Lazenby Green (January 23, 1914 – February 2, 2001) was a United States district judge of the United States District Court for the District of Columbia.

== Education and career ==
Born in Arnold, Maryland, Green received a Juris Doctor from Washington College of Law at American University in 1941. She was a claims adjuster for the Lumberman's Mutual Casualty Company in Washington, D.C. from 1942 to 1943. She was a claims attorney for the same company from 1943 to 1947. She was in private practice of law in Washington, D.C., and Annapolis, Maryland from 1947 to 1968.

== Federal judicial service ==
Green was nominated by President Lyndon B. Johnson on April 11, 1968, to a seat on the United States District Court for the District of Columbia vacated by Judge Burnita Shelton Matthews. She was confirmed by the United States Senate on June 6, 1968, and received her commission on June 7, 1968. She assumed senior status on January 15, 1984. Her service was terminated on February 2, 2001, due to her death in Arnold.

== Sources ==
Legal offices
Preceded by Burnita Shelton Matthews	Judge of the United States District Court for the District of Columbia; 1968–1984	Succeeded by Stanley Sporkin
