= Burnita Shelton Matthews =

American judge

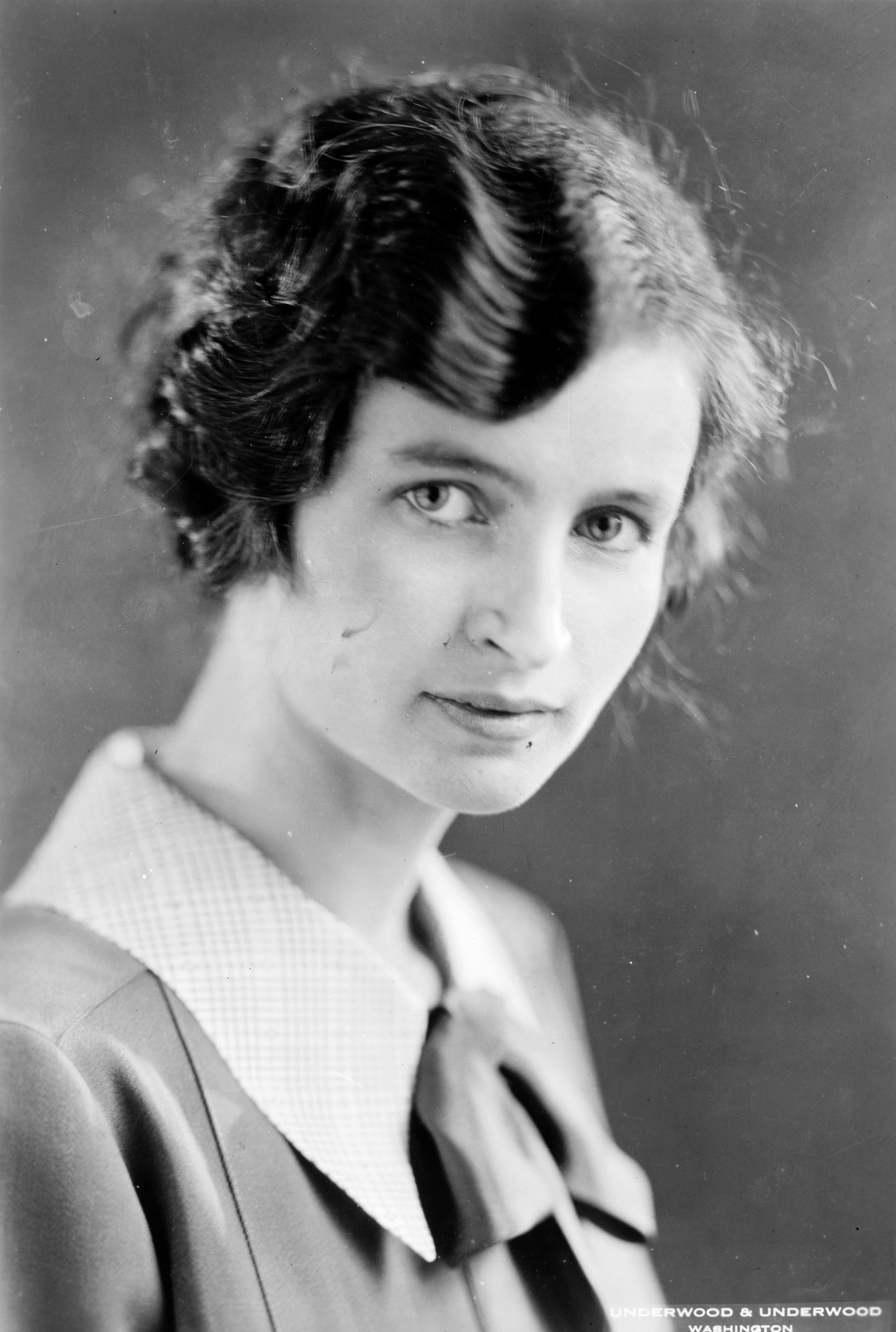
- Burnita Shelton Matthews in 1925

Senior Judge of the United States District Court for the District of Columbia
- In office March 1, 1968 – April 25, 1988

Judge of the United States District Court for the District of Columbia
- In office October 21, 1949 – March 1, 1968
- Appointed by: Harry S. Truman
- Preceded by: Seat established by 63 Stat. 493
- Succeeded by: June Lazenby Green

Personal details
- Born: Burnita Shelton; December 28, 1894 Burnell, Mississippi, U.S.
- Died: April 25, 1988 (aged 93) Washington, D.C., U.S.
- Party: National Woman's
- Education: George Washington University Law School (LL.B., LL.M.)

Burnita Shelton Matthews (December 28, 1894 – April 25, 1988) was a United States district judge of the United States District Court for the District of Columbia. She was the first woman appointed to serve on a United States District Court.

== Early life and education ==
Matthews was born Burnita Shelton in Burnell, (an unincorporated community in Claiborne County), Mississippi, on December 28, 1894. Her father was a planter and chancery court judge. After attending local schools, she went to the Cincinnati Conservatory of Music Her brother was sent to law school.

During World War I, she moved to Washington, D.C., took the civil service exam, and gained a position at the Veterans Administration. In 1917 she enrolled in the night school of the National University Law School (today the George Washington University Law School). She received a Bachelor of Laws in 1919, a Master of Laws in 1920 and passed the District of Columbia bar exam the same year. She married lawyer Percy A. Matthews.

== Career ==
Matthews met with resistance; she was rejected by male professional lawyers' associations, and the District of Columbia Bar Association returned her application and check for dues. Matthews and other women formed their own professional associations, including the Woman's Bar Association of the District of Columbia and the National Association of Women Lawyers.

After the VA told her they would never hire a woman lawyer for their legal department, she founded the law firm of Matthews, Berrien, and Greathouse with two other women attorneys, who were also National Woman's Party members and would remain in private practice of law from 1920 until her appointment to the federal bench in 1949.

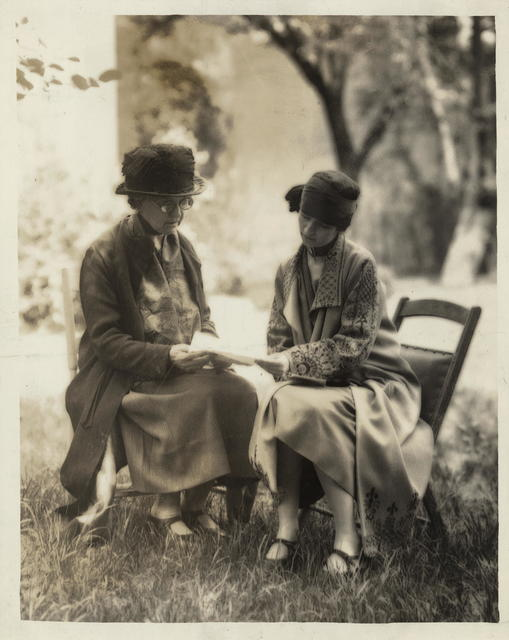
Burnita Shelton Matthews (right) discussing a bill to extend suffrage to the women of Puerto Rico with Zonia Baber, 1926

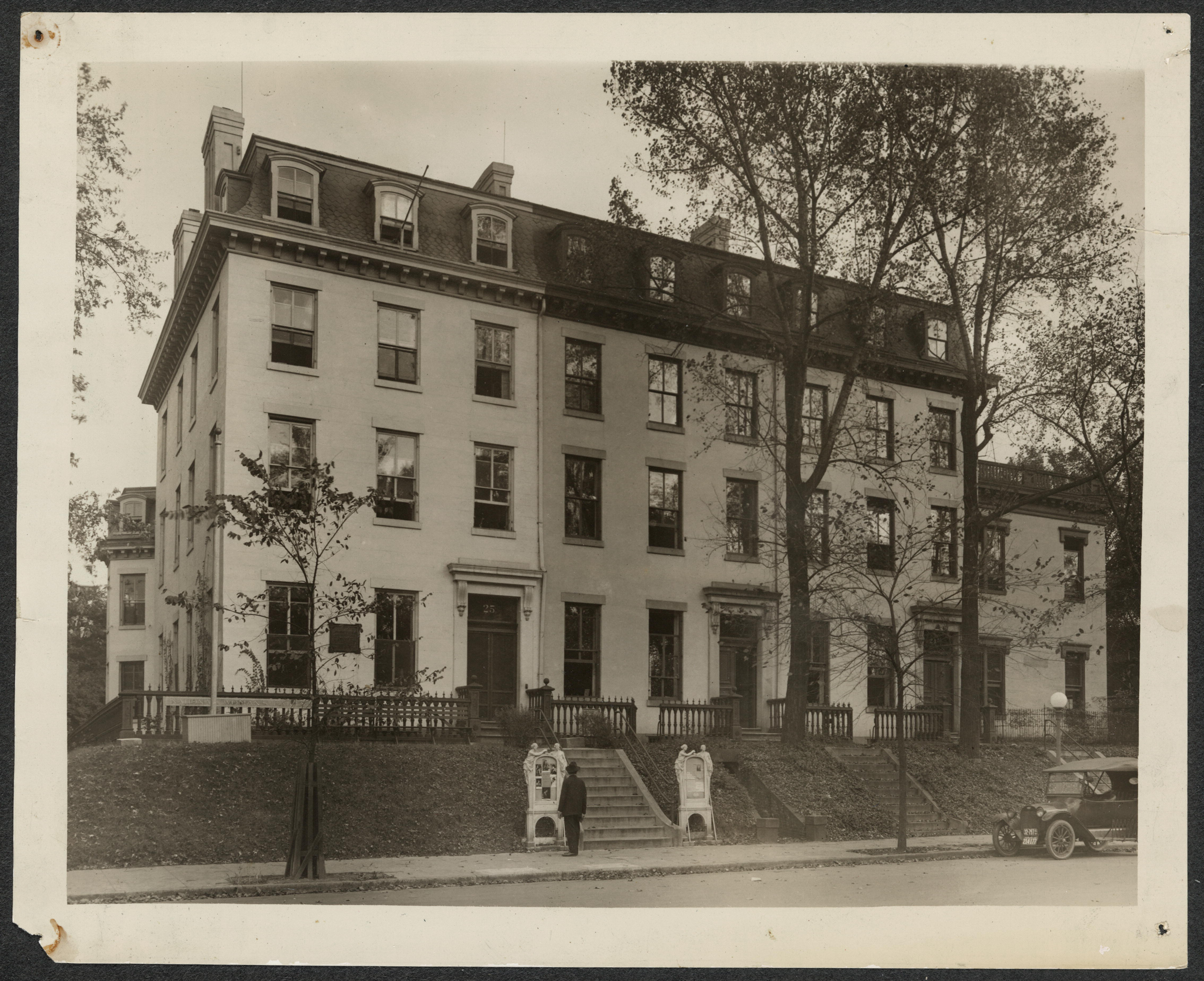
Headquarters of the National Woman's Party from 1922 to 1929, now the site of the U.S. Supreme Court

Matthews worked closely with the suffragist National Woman's Party, serving as the organization's counsel starting in 1921. In 1926 she wrote the essay titled, "Women have equal rights with men: a reply" published in the American Bar Journal explaining the position of her party on labor inequality and political rights related to women. She represented the party in its effort to prevent condemnation of its Washington headquarters by the federal government; the land was condemned in order for the United States Supreme Court Building to be constructed on the site. Matthews successfully obtained the largest condemnation settlement awarded by the United States Government at the time, $299,200.

Additionally, Matthews was associate editor of the Women Lawyer's Journal from 1934 to 1935. She was a professor of the Washington College of Law at American University in Washington, D.C. from 1933 to 1939 and from 1942 to 1948.

== Federal judicial service ==
Matthews received a recess appointment from President Harry S. Truman on October 21, 1949, to the United States District Court for the District of Columbia, to a new seat created by 63 Stat. 493, becoming the first woman to serve on a United States District Court. She was nominated to the same seat by President Truman on January 5, 1950. She was confirmed by the United States Senate on April 4, 1950, and received her commission on April 7, 1950. She assumed senior status on March 1, 1968. Her service was terminated on April 25, 1988, due to her death in Washington, D.C.

=== Notable cases ===
Matthews heard several newsworthy cases, including the passport denial of actor Paul Robeson and the 1956 bribery trial of Jimmy Hoffa, prominent Teamster official.

== See also ==
- List of first women lawyers and judges in the United States
- List of first women lawyers and judges in Washington D.C.

Legal offices
Preceded by Seat established by 63 Stat. 493	Judge of the United States District Court for the District of Columbia; 1949–1968	Succeeded by June Lazenby Green
