= Dan King =

Dan King may refer to:

- Dan King (skeptic) (1791–1864), American physician and early skeptical writer
- Dan King (basketball) (1931–2003), American basketball player
- Dan King, Canadian Green Party candidate

== See also ==
- Daniel King (disambiguation)
