= Steven S. Honigman =

American lawyer

Steve Honigman

General Counsel of the Navy
- In office June 1, 1993 – March 15, 1998
- President: Bill Clinton
- Preceded by: Craig S. King
- Succeeded by: Stephen W. Preston

Personal details
- Born: Steven Sanford Honigman; May 14, 1948 Brooklyn, New York
- Died: July 26, 2022 (age 74) New York, New York
- Spouse: Irene Finel-Honigman
- Education: New York University (BA); Yale University (JD)

Steven S. Honigman (14 May 1948 – 26 July 2022) was an American lawyer who served as General Counsel of the Navy from 1993 to 1998.

== Early life and education ==
Honigman was born and raised in Brooklyn, New York City, graduating from Midwood High School in 1965. He earned a Bachelor of Arts degree from New York University in 1969 and his Juris Doctor from Yale Law School in 1972. Honigman was admitted to the New York State bar in 1973.

== Career ==
From 1972 to 1973, Honigman was a law clerk for District Judge Jacob Mishler. He then served on active duty in the Navy Judge Advocate General's Corps until 1977.

From 1977 to 1982, Honigman was an associate at the law firm of Paul, Weiss, Rifkind, Wharton & Garrison specializing in civil litigation. From 1982 to 1993, he was a partner at the law firm of Miller, Singer, Raives & Brandes.

In 1993, President of the United States Bill Clinton nominated Honigman as General Counsel of the Navy, and, after Senate confirmation, he held this office from June 1, 1993, until March 15, 1998. One of his first duties as General Counsel was to assist United States Secretary of the Navy John Howard Dalton in his confidential investigation of the Tailhook scandal. Dalton recommended removing Chief of Naval Operations Admiral Frank Kelso for his role in covering up the scandal. As General Counsel of the Navy, Honigman oversaw procurement litigation reforms. In 1997, President Clinton named him a Special Assistant responsible for purchasing encryption technology government-wide. He was awarded the Navy Distinguished Public Service Medal for his service to the Navy.

Upon leaving the United States Department of the Navy in 1998, Honigman joined Thelen LLP as a partner. Honigman was also a member of the EastWest Institute.

== Personal ==
Honigman married Irene Elizabeth Finel. They have a daughter.
