= Zonia Baber =

American geologist and geographer

- Portrait of Zonia Baber
- Born: Mary Arizona Baber; August 24, 1862; Kansas Township, Edgar County, Illinois, U.S.
- Died: January 10, 1956 (aged 93); East Lansing, Michigan, U.S.
- Burial place: Evergreen Cemetery, Lansing, Michigan
- Education: University of Chicago (BS)
- Occupations: Geologist, Teacher, Innovator, Principal, Geographer, Activist
- Title: Founder of the Chicago Geographical Society

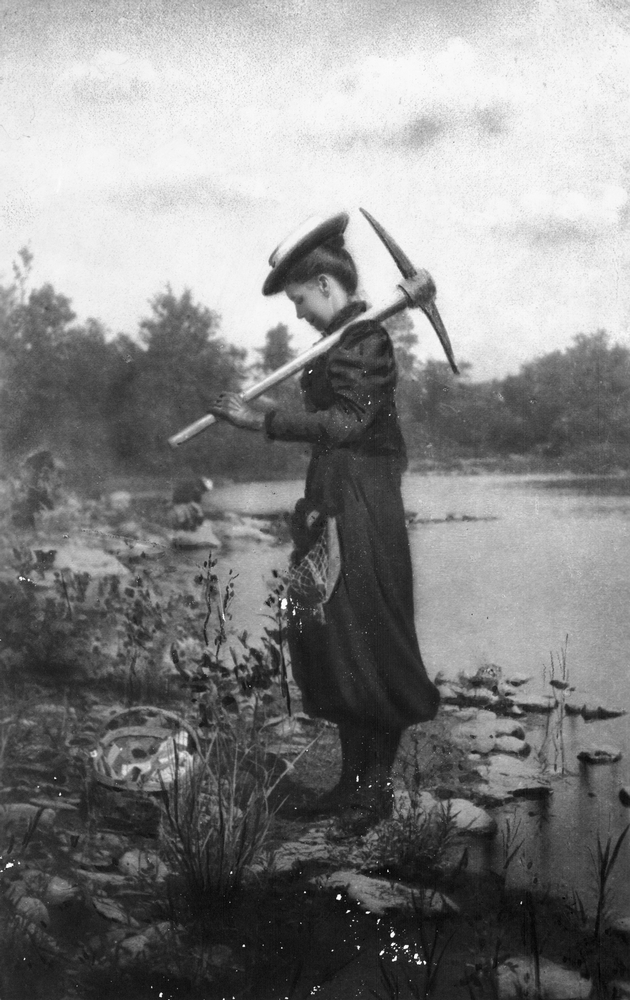
Zonia Baber collecting fossils at Mazon Creek, Illinois, as part of a Geology class in 1895 (University of Chicago Library)

Mary Arizona "Zonia" Baber (August 24, 1862 – January 10, 1956) was an American geographer and geologist best known for developing methods for teaching geography. Her teachings emphasized experiential learning through field work and experimentation.

== Education and teaching career ==
As Baber's hometown of Dudley, just east of Kansas, Illinois, did not offer education beyond elementary school, she moved 10 miles to Paris, Illinois, to attend high school where she lived with her uncle. After high school, she attended Normal school to train as a teacher.

Baber started her career as a private school principal from 1886–1888. She then took a job teaching at Cook County Normal School (e.g., now split into Chicago State University and Northeastern Illinois University), where she served as the head of the Geography Department from 1890 to 1899. She taught the interdependence of structural geography, history and the natural sciences. These courses focused on primarily geography, continental study, meteorology, and mathematical geography. While teaching, Baber also took classes in geology, including the first class that accepted women. She earned her Bachelor of Science in 1904.

From 1901 to 1921, Baber worked as an associate professor, as well as the head of geography and geology in the Department of Education at the University of Chicago. At the same time she was the principal of the University of Chicago Laboratory Schools.

When it came to teaching, Baber preferred to focus on field work—enabling her students to act and discover rather than memorize facts. Baber's teaching methods are still used today.

The student discovers too late that ordinary unrelated knowledge is not power; that only scientific knowledge—unified, related experiences—are valuable.

Baber promoted field trips and first-hand experience rather than the memorization of facts and definitions, but she also worked to improve conventional learning aids. During her time as chairwoman of the Women's International League for Peace and Freedom (WILPF), she created a committee to scrutinize textbooks in order to replace antiquated or inappropriate phrases and concepts with ones intended to stop the perpetuation of negative prejudices.

In 1920, Baber published "A Proposal for Renaming the Solar Circles in the Journal of Geography". The north and south solar tropics, traditionally referred to as the Tropic of Capricorn and the Tropic of Cancer, Baber proposed the name be changed to The Northern Tropic and The Southern Tropic. Today both terms are accepted in the world of geography, though no official change was made.

== Geographic Society and advocacy work ==
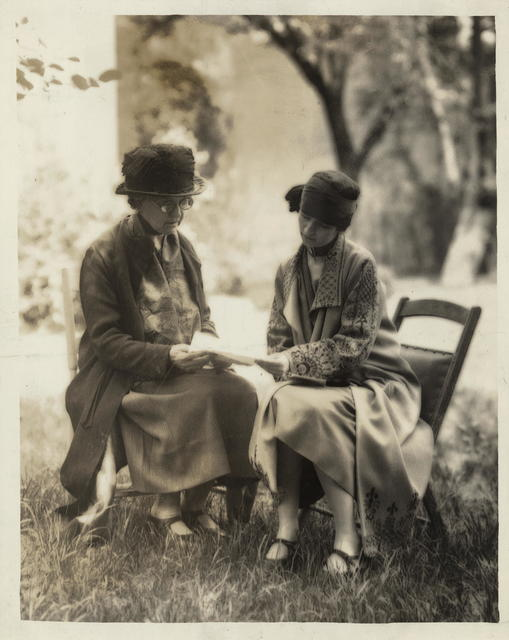
Zonia Baber (left) and Burnita Shelton Matthews discussing a bill to extend suffrage to the women of Puerto Rico, 1926

In 1898 Baber co-founded the Geographic Society of Chicago. She served as the president and was involved with the Society for 50 years. In 1948 she received a lifetime achievement award.

Zonia Baber was passionate about social issues throughout her life. As a feminist and anti-imperialist, she joined as well as initiated many efforts to fight against sexism, racism, and intolerance. She was an advocate of women's suffrage in the United States, and in 1926 she represented the women of Puerto Rico in the extension of suffrage to the region.

As previously mentioned, Baber served as chairwoman of the Women's International League for Peace and Freedom, as well as a member of the executive committee of the National Association for the Advancement of Colored People's (NAACP) Chicago branch, and as chair of the Race Relations Committee of the Chicago Women's Club Baber also traveled extensively—both for her professional career and for her advocacy work—to attend international conferences and events. One such occasion was when she traveled with a WILPF delegation to Haiti in 1926.

== Design ==
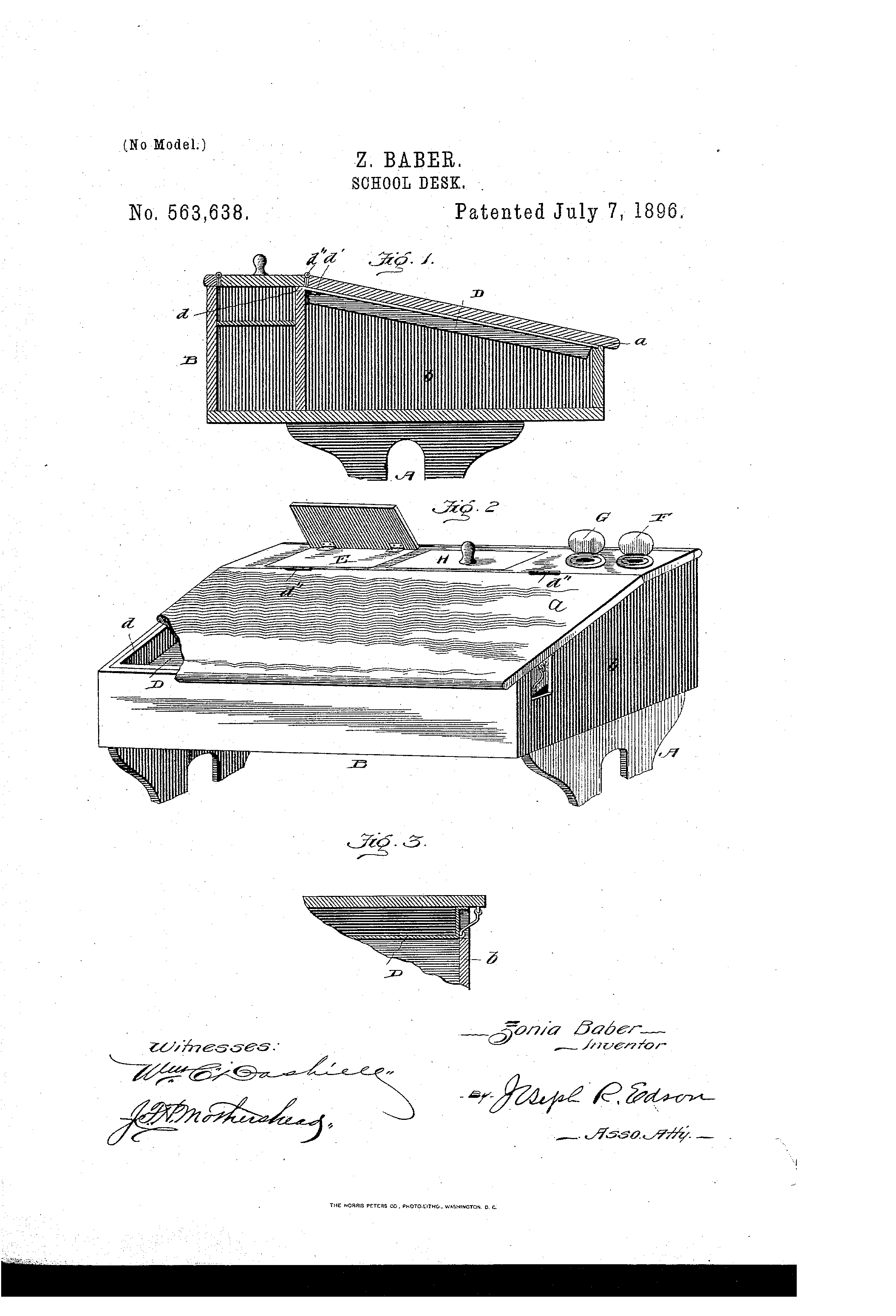
School desk design patented by Zonia Baber on July 7, 1896

In 1896, Zonia Baber designed a new school desk with features specifically for the teaching of geography and other sciences. Unlike a regular school desk, Zonia's featured trays and compartments meant to store learning supplies. Having these trays and compartments meant that students using her desk would always have their learning supplies at hand.

== Selected works ==
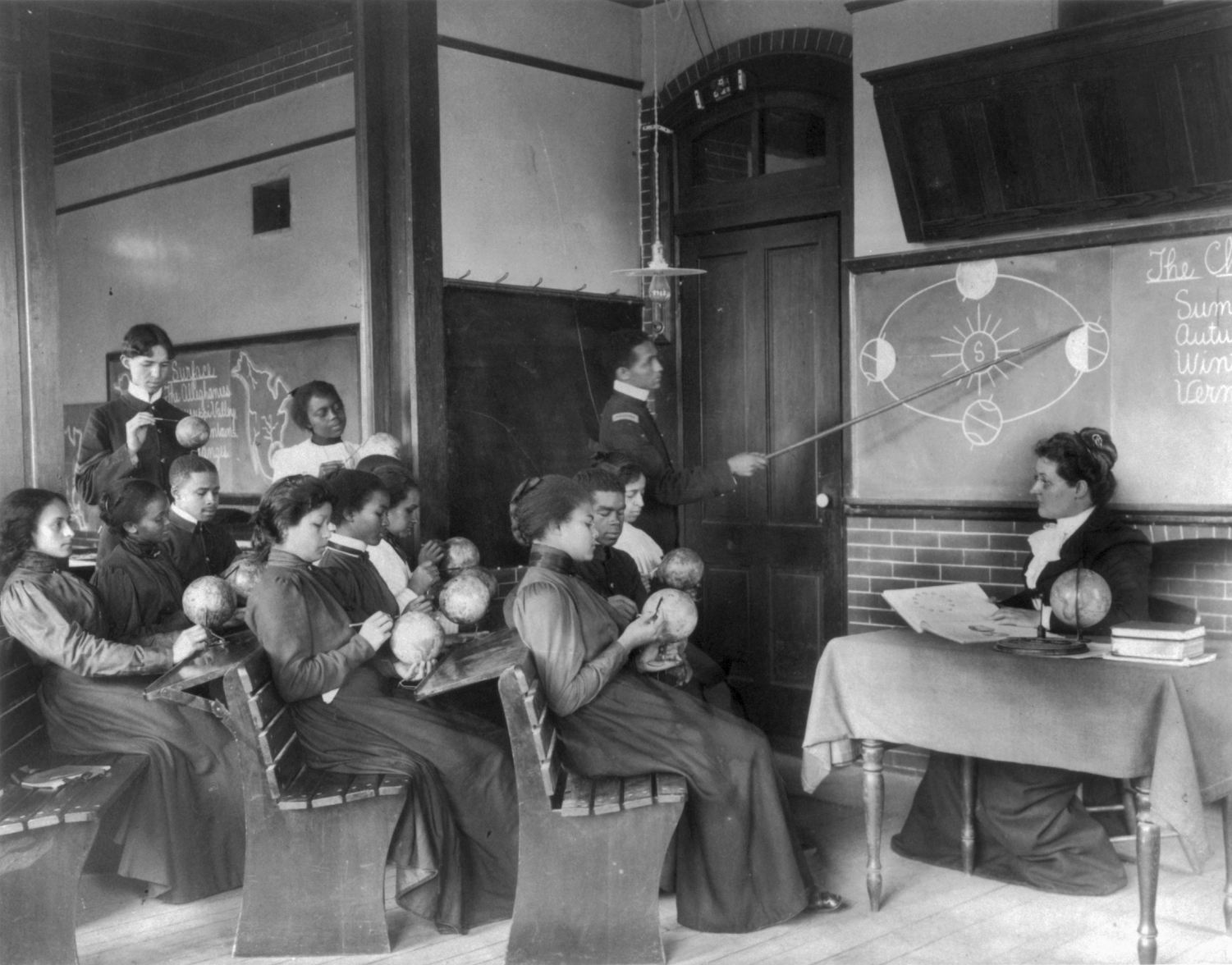
A class in mathematical geography studying Earth's rotation around the Sun, Hampton Institute, Hampton, Virginia, c. 1899

- (with Wallace W. Atwood) 'Geography,' The Elementary School Teacher and Course of Study 1, p. 42 (1900).
- (with Wallace W. Atwood) 'Geography,' The Elementary School Teacher and Course of Study 1, p. 130 (1900).
- (with Wallace W. Atwood) 'Geography,' The Elementary School Teacher and Course of Study 1, p. 183 (1900).
- (with Wallace W. Atwood) 'Geography,' The Elementary School Teacher and Course of Study 1, p. 284 (1900).
- 'Geography,' The Elementary School Teacher and Course of Study 1, p. 788 (1901).
- 'Geography,' The Elementary School Teacher and Course of Study 2, p. 48 (1901).
- 'Geography,' The Elementary School Teacher and Course of Study 2, p. 108 (1901).
- 'Geography,' The Elementary School Teacher and Course of Study 2, p. 194 (1901).
- 'Geography,' The Elementary School Teacher and Course of Study 2, p. 346 (1902).
- 'Field work in the elementary school,' The Journal of Geography 4, p. 18 (1905).
- 'The scope of geography,' The Journal of Geography 4, p. 386 (1905).
- 'A lesson in Geography—From Chicago to the Atlantic,' The Elementary School Teacher 7, p. 458 (1907).
- 'The teaching of the geography of the continent of Eurasia,' The Elementary School Teacher 7, p. 519 (1907).
- 'Conservation of important geographical areas for educational purposes,' The Journal of Geography 11, p. 287 (1913).
- 'Lost opportunities in teaching geography,' The Journal of Geography 14, p. 296 (1916).
- 'The oceans: our future pastures,' The Scientific Monthly 3, p. 258 (1916).
- 'A proposal for renaming the solar circles,' The Journal of Geography 19, p. 245 (1920).
- (with E.G. Balch) 'Problems of education,' in Occupied Haiti, ed. E.G. Balch, NY: The Writer's Publishing Company, p. 93 (1927).
- 'Peace Symbols,' Chicago Schools Journal 18, p. 151 (1937).
- 'Moral Issues,' in The Negro Problems of the Community to the West, Report of the Commission on Intercommunity relationships of the Hyde Park-Kentwood Council of Churches and Synagogues, p. 28 (1940).
- Peace Symbols, Chicago: Women's International League for Peace and Freedom (1948).

== See also ==
- Timeline of women in science
