= Scott W. Muller =

American lawyer

11th General Counsel of the Central Intelligence Agency
- In office 2002–2004
- Appointed by: George Tenet
- President: Bill Clinton
- Preceded by: John A. Rizzo (acting)
- Succeeded by: John A. Rizzo (acting)

Assistant United States Attorney
- In office 1978–1982
- District: United States District Court for the Southern District of New York

Scott W. Muller is an American attorney who has served in both public service and private practice. He earned his undergraduate degree from Princeton University in 1971 and his Juris Doctor from Georgetown University Law Center in 1975, where he served as case and notes editor of the Georgetown Law Journal.

Following law school, Muller clerked for Judge Francis L. Van Dusen on the U.S. Court of Appeals for the Third Circuit. He then served with the Watergate Special Prosecution Force. From 1978 to 1982, he was an Assistant U.S. Attorney in the Southern District of New York. In 1982, Muller returned to Davis Polk & Wardwell LLP, where he had initially joined in 1976, and became a partner in 1985.

In 2002, Muller was nominated and confirmed as General Counsel of the Central Intelligence Agency (CIA), overseeing the agency's legal affairs and the CIA's Office of General Counsel (OCG). After his tenure at the CIA, he returned to Davis Polk & Wardwell LLP as counsel in the firm's Litigation Department, focusing on white-collar criminal defense and investigations.

Muller has served as vice chairman of the American Bar Association's White Collar Crime Committee and was an adjunct professor at Georgetown University Law Center, teaching a seminar on federal criminal process. Additionally, he is a member of the American Law Institute.

Muller's has been a member of the board of governors of St. Albans School in Washington, D.C., and served on the audit committee of the National Cathedral Foundation. He has also been involved with St. Paul's School as a trustee and chairman of its Alumni Fund, and has served as a national trustee of the Boys and Girls Clubs of America.
