= Courtney Simmons Elwood =

American attorney (born 1968)

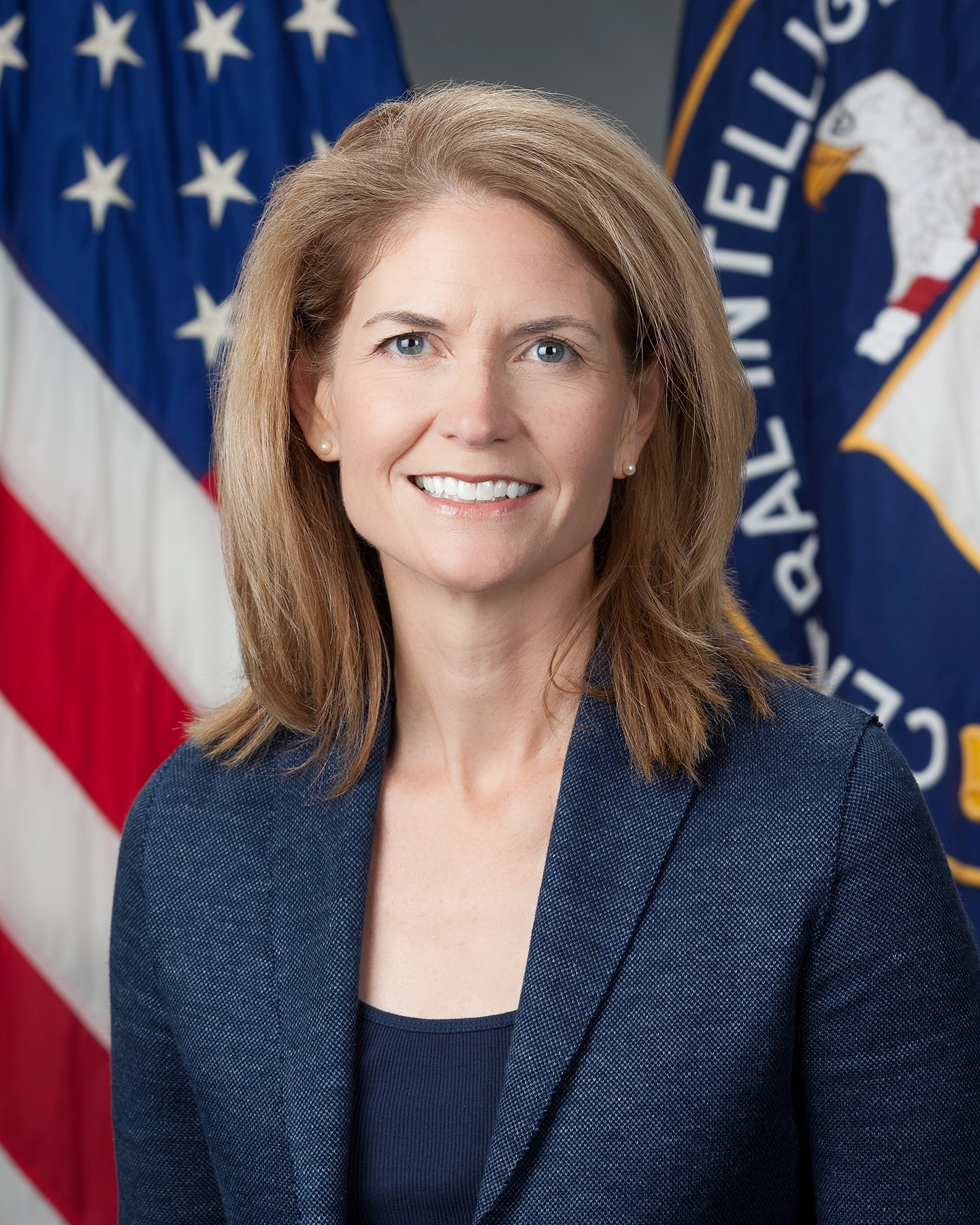
- Official portrait, 2018

General Counsel of the Central Intelligence Agency
- In office June 6, 2017 – January 20, 2021
- President: Donald Trump
- Preceded by: Caroline D. Krass
- Succeeded by: Kate Heinzelman

Personal details
- Born: June 6, 1968 (age 58) Bethesda, Maryland, U.S.
- Spouse: John Elwood (m. 1996)
- Education: Washington and Lee University (BA); Yale University (JD)

Courtney Simmons Elwood (born June 6, 1968) is an American attorney who served as the general counsel of the Central Intelligence Agency (CIA) in the Trump administration between 2017 and 2021.

== Early life and education ==
Elwood was born in Bethesda, Maryland. She was a member of the first graduating class of West Potomac High School in Alexandria, Virginia. She earned a Bachelor of Arts from Washington and Lee University and a Juris Doctor from Yale Law School.

== Career ==
Prior to assuming her post at the CIA, she was a partner with the firm Kellogg, Hansen, Todd, Figel & Frederick. She joined this firm in 1996, after clerking for Chief Justice William Rehnquist on the Supreme Court of the United States during the 1995 term and for Judge J. Michael Luttig on the United States Court of Appeals for the Fourth Circuit.

Elwood has served as an associate counsel to the president, deputy counsel to the vice president, and deputy chief of staff and counselor to the attorney general. In March 2017, she was announced as President Donald Trump's nominee to become general counsel of the CIA. She was confirmed by the United States Senate with a vote of 67–33 on June 6, 2017.

== Personal life ==
On November 23, 1996, she married John Elwood, also a Yale-trained lawyer, in Alexandria, Virginia.

== See also ==
- Trump–Ukraine scandal
- List of law clerks for the chief justice of the United States
