= Stephen W. Preston =

American lawyer (born 1957)

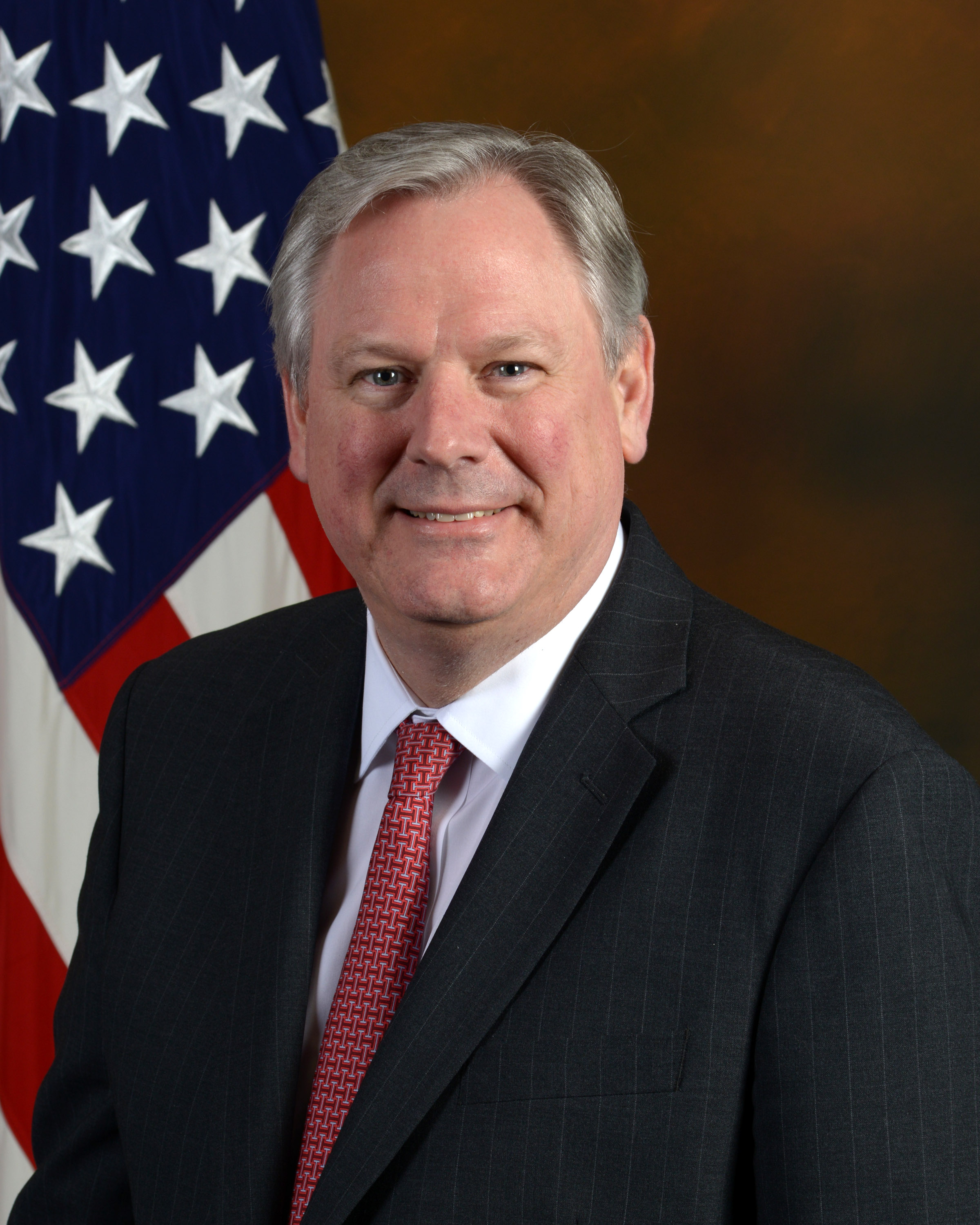

General Counsel of the Department of Defense
- In office October 25, 2013 – June 1, 2015
- President: Barack Obama
- Secretary: Chuck Hagel; Ash Carter
- Preceded by: Jeh Johnson
- Succeeded by: Jennifer O'Connor

General Counsel of the Central Intelligence Agency
- In office July 2009 – October 2013
- President: Barack Obama
- Director: Leon Panetta; Michael Morrell (acting); David Petraeus; John O. Brennan
- Preceded by: John A. Rizzo
- Succeeded by: Robert Eatinger (acting); Caroline Krass

General Counsel of the Navy
- In office September 28, 1998 – November 17, 2000
- President: Bill Clinton
- Secretary: John H. Dalton; Richard Danzig
- Preceded by: Steven S. Honigman
- Succeeded by: John E. Sparks (Acting)

Personal details
- Born: Stephen Woolman Preston; May 30, 1957 (age 69) Atlanta, Georgia, U.S.
- Education: Yale University (BA); Harvard University (JD)

Stephen Woolman Preston (born May 30, 1957) is an American lawyer who served in the administrations of presidents Barack Obama and Bill Clinton.

After graduating from Yale University and Harvard Law School, he served as General Counsel of the Navy from 1998 to 2000, General Counsel of the Central Intelligence Agency from 2009 to 2013, and General Counsel of the Department of Defense from 2013 to 2016.

== Education ==
Preston received his Bachelor of Arts from Yale University, and then attended Harvard Law School, where he was a member of the Harvard Legal Aid Bureau, graduating with a Juris Doctor in 1983.

== Career ==
Preston joined the law firm of Wilmer Cutler Pickering Hale and Dorr in 1986.

In 1993, he left WilmerHale to become Principal Deputy General Counsel of the United States Department of Defense, during which time he spent time as acting General Counsel. In 1995, he joined the Civil Division of the United States Department of Justice as Deputy Assistant Attorney General, where he was responsible for civil appeals.

In 1998, Bill Clinton nominated Preston as General Counsel of the Navy, succeeding Steven S. Honigman. Preston served from September 28, 1998 to November 17, 2000. In 2001, he returned to WilmerHale as a partner.

On April 14, 2009, President Barack Obama nominated Preston to serve as General Counsel of the Central Intelligence Agency. He served as General Counsel of the agency from 2009 to 2013.

He was nominated by President Obama to serve as General Counsel of the Department of Defense in 2013. He was later confirmed by the Senate, sworn in and served in that position from 2013 to 2016.

Preston returned to WilmerHale in 2016.
