= Kate Heinzelman =

American attorney

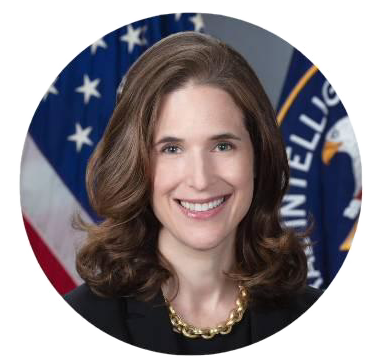

General Counsel of the Central Intelligence Agency
- In office July 14, 2022 – January 20, 2025
- President: Joe Biden
- Preceded by: Courtney Simmons Elwood
- Succeeded by: Joshua Simmons

Personal details
- Born: Kate Elizabeth Heinzelman
- Spouse: Jonathan Cooper (m. 2013)
- Education: Yale University (BA, JD)

Kate Elizabeth Heinzelman is an American attorney who served as the general counsel of the Central Intelligence Agency from 2022 to 2025. She was nominated by President Joe Biden to the position and was confirmed by the Senate on July 14, 2022.

== Education ==
Heinzelman earned a Bachelor of Arts degree from Yale University and a Juris Doctor from Yale Law School.

== Career ==
From 2009 to 2010, Heinzelman served as a law clerk for Judge Merrick Garland of the U.S. Court of Appeals for the District of Columbia Circuit. She later clerked for Chief Justice John Roberts at the Supreme Court of the United States.

From 2012 to 2013, she served as counsel in the United States Department of Justice National Security Division. From 2013 to 2015, she served as Associate White House counsel and assistant to President Barack Obama. From 2015 to 2017, she served as deputy general counsel of the United States Department of Health and Human Services. After the end of the Obama administration, in 2017, Heinzelman joined Sidley Austin as counsel before becoming a partner in 2020.

President Joe Biden announced his nomination of Heinzelman on March 8, 2022 for the position of General Counsel of the Central Intelligence Agency. The United States Senate Select Committee on Intelligence held its open hearing for her nomination on April 6, 2022. On May 10, 2022 the Committee held its closed meeting on the nomination, with chairman Senator Mark Warner favorably reporting the nomination and passing it on to the full Senate. Committee Vice Chair Senator Marco Rubio opposed confirmation. On July 14, 2022, the United States Senate confirmed her nomination by a 50–41 vote.
