= Joshua Simmons =

American politician and lawyer

Joshua Bradford Simmons
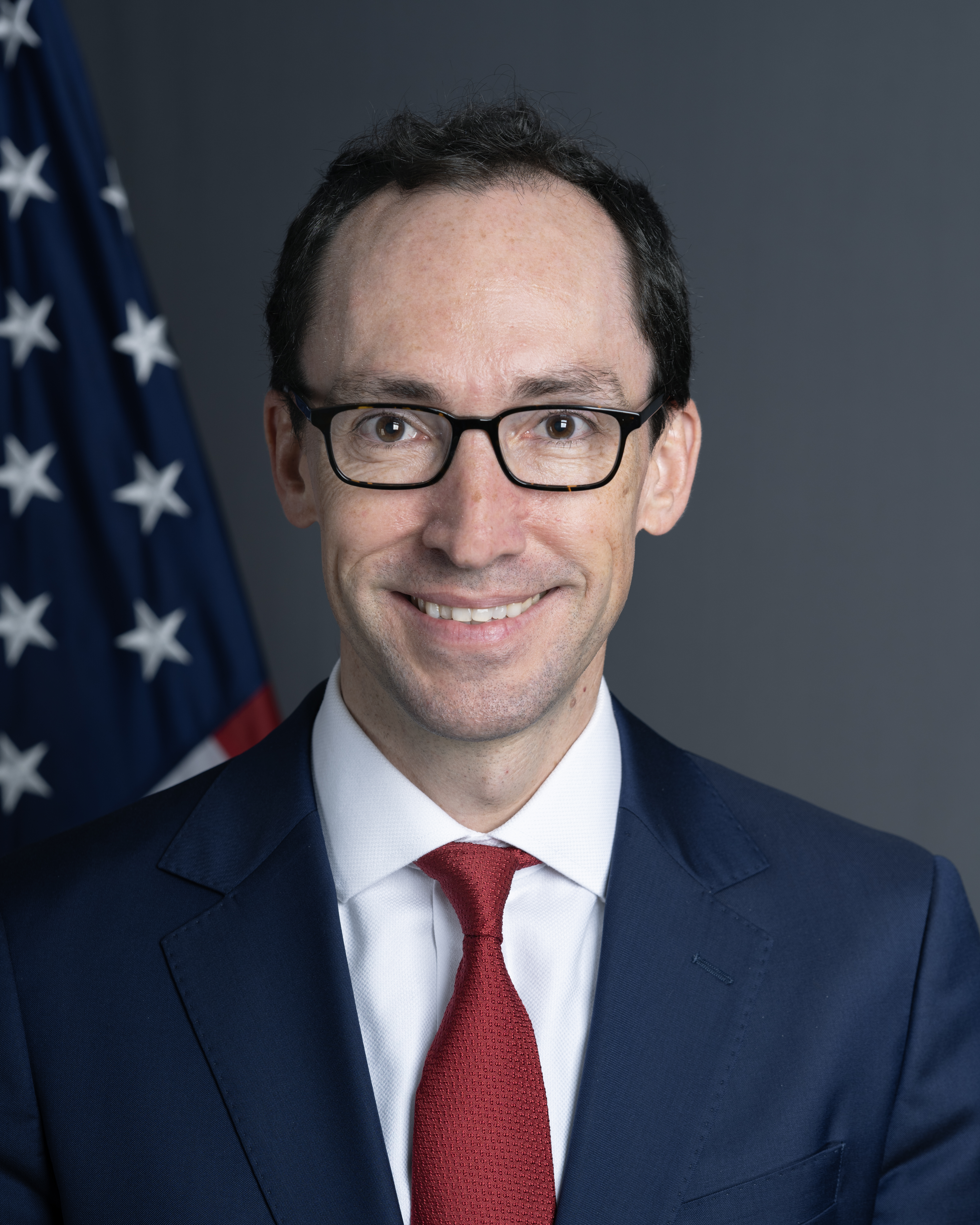
- 2025 Official Portrait

General Counsel of the Central Intelligence Agency
- Incumbent
- Assumed office January 8, 2026
- President: Donald Trump
- Preceded by: Kate Heinzelman

Personal details
- Born: July 13, 1982 (age 44) Abingdon, Virginia
- Education: University of North Carolina; University of Virginia

Joshua Bradford Simmons is an American attorney general who serves as General Counsel for the Central Intelligence Agency.

== Early life and education ==
Simmons was born in 1982 in Abingdon, Virginia. Simmons received his undergraduate degree from the University of North Carolina and earned his JD at the University of Virginia.

== Career ==
Simmons practiced law in major firms including Wiley Rein, Covington & Burling, and Three Crowns. Simmons also worked in the State Department's Office of the Legal Advisor. He has spoken at events hosted by the Federalist Society.

In September 2025, President Donald Trump nominated Simmons to serve as General Counsel for the Central Intelligence Agency. The Senate held a hearing on his nomination in October 2025 and he was confirmed in January 2026. Prior to Simmons assuming the role, Michael Ellis had been acting as both the Deputy Director and General Counsel of the CIA.

Simmons has also authored Christian young adult novels.
