= Anthony Lapham =

Environmentalist and CIA lawyer

Assistant United States Attorney for the District of Columbia
- In office 1962–1966

Executive Assistant to the Special Assistant to the Secretary of the Treasury
- In office 1965–1967

3rd General Counsel of the Central Intelligence Agency
- In office June 1, 1976 – May 9, 1979
- President: Gerald Ford; Jimmy Carter
- Directors: George H. W. Bush; Stansfield Turner
- Preceded by: John S. Warner
- Succeeded by: Daniel B. Silver

Personal details
- Born: August 22, 1936 San Francisco
- Died: November 11, 2006 (aged 70) Somewhere on the Cane River
- Parent: Lewis A. Lapham
- Education: Yale University; Georgetown University Law Center
- Sibling: Lewis H. Lapham

Military service
- Branch/service: United States Army; United States Navy
- Battles/wars: Cold War

Anthony "Tony" Abbott Lapham was the 3rd General Counsel of the Central Intelligence Agency (CIA), acting as the CIA's chief legal officer during the chaotic period of the Church Committee. Lapham was also known as an environmentalist, and was chairman of American Rivers, a nonprofit dedicated to preserving rivers, and died while on a trout fishing trip on the Cane River. He served on the board of the Krebser Fund for Rappahannock County Conservation and was a trustee of Ocean Conservancy, American Farmland Trust, National Audubon Society, Environmental Defense Fund and the Audubon Naturalist Society of the Central Atlantic States.

== Life ==
Lapham was born in San Francisco. His father was Lewis A. Lapham, who had helped create the Professional golf tours, and was President of the Bankers Trust New York Corporation and several shipping companies.

In 1958, Lapham earned his bachelors degree from Yale University. Even though his father had been a member of the Skull and Bones, Lapham himself was a member of the Manuscript Society, Yale's senior society dedicated to Arts and letters.

Later in 1958, Lapham moved to Washington, D.C., where he attended night school at Georgetown University Law Center, holding down a day job in Capitol Hill. He earned his law degree from Georgetown in 1961.

During this time, Lapham served in the United States Army with the 226th Military Intelligence detachment. After his service in the Army, Lapham joined the United States Navy, working in the Navy's Judge Advocate General's Corps for a legal unit.

From 1962 to 1966, Lapham served as the Assistant United States Attorney for the District of Columbia.

From 1965 to 1967, Lapham served as the Executive Assistant to the Special Assistant to the Secretary of the Treasury.

Beginning in 1967, Lapham joined the Washington–based law firm Shea and Gardner as an associate. Three years later, he became a Partner.

In 1976, Lapham was the first General Counsel to be brought in from "outside" the CIA. Lapham was the lawyer who was ultimately responsible for drafting the CIA's public apology for its part in the MKUltra program. Lapham also presided over the CIA's legal response to many other public revelations during the Church Committee. Michael Hayden said that this was "a period of momentous change and challenges for the agency."

In 1980, Lapham returned to Shea and Gardner, which had been absorbed by the Boston law firm, Goodwin Procter. While in private practice, Lapham represented Adolfo Calero, the leader of the Nicaraguan Democratic Force, and later represented the chief paymaster for Charles Taylor. Most notably, Lapham also represented his former boss, Stansfield Turner, when Turner himself sued the CIA.

Lapham was also on the Board of Trustees for WETA.
