= John S. Warner =

American lawyer and legal architect of the CIA

Assistant General Counsel of the Office of Strategic Services
- In office December 1944 – 1945 Serving with Lawrence R. Houston
- Appointed by: James B. Donovan

Deputy General Counsel of the Strategic Services Unit
- In office 1945–1946
- Serving under: Lawrence R. Houston

Deputy General Counsel of the Central Intelligence Group
- In office 1946–1947
- Serving under: Lawrence R. Houston

1st Deputy General Counsel of the Central Intelligence Agency
- In office 1947–1973
- Serving under: Lawrence R. Houston

3rd Legislative Counsel of the Central Intelligence Agency
- In office 1957–1968
- Preceded by: Norman Paul
- Succeeded by: John Maury

2nd General Counsel of the Central Intelligence Agency
- In office 1973–1976
- Preceded by: Lawrence R. Houston
- Succeeded by: Anthony Lapham

Personal details
- Born: February 12, 1919 Washington, D.C.
- Died: April 29, 2006 (aged 87) Tucson
- Education: American Institute of Banking; Southeastern University (Washington, D.C.); Columbus School of Law

Military service
- Branch/service: United States Army Air Forces; United States Air Force
- Rank: Major General
- Battles/wars: World War II

John S. Warner was the first Legislative Counsel of the Central Intelligence Agency and the 2nd General Counsel of the Central Intelligence Agency (CIA), and one of the architects of intelligence law in the United States of America. Warner, working alongside Larry Houston, helped draft much of the founding documents of the CIA.

== Life ==
During World War II, Warner flew 35 combat missions in Boeing B-17 Flying Fortress bombers for the United States Army Air Forces. While on leave in Washington, D.C., Warner met James B. Donovan, who was the General Counsel of the Office of Strategic Services (OSS). Donovan recruited Warner into the OSS.

In 1946, Warner began working with the Central Intelligence Group (CIG) as Deputy General Counsel and played a key role in drafting legislative proposals that shaped the CIA’s legal foundation, including the National Security Act of 1947 and the Central Intelligence Agency Act of 1949. These laws granted the Agency financial and operational flexibility, particularly through the use of unvouchered funds.

When the United States Air Force was created in 1947, Warner became a charter member, and held a position in the Air Force Reserve Command until 1979.

Warner served in various legal capacities within the Agency, eventually becoming CIA General Counsel from 1973 to 1976. Over his tenure, he navigated evolving oversight dynamics as congressional scrutiny of the CIA increased. He also dealt with legal challenges related to maintaining secrecy while ensuring the Agency operated within the law. His career spanned major historical events, including the Cold War and the Watergate scandal, which significantly affected public perception and governmental oversight of the CIA.
