= Stanley Sporkin =

American judge (1932–2020)

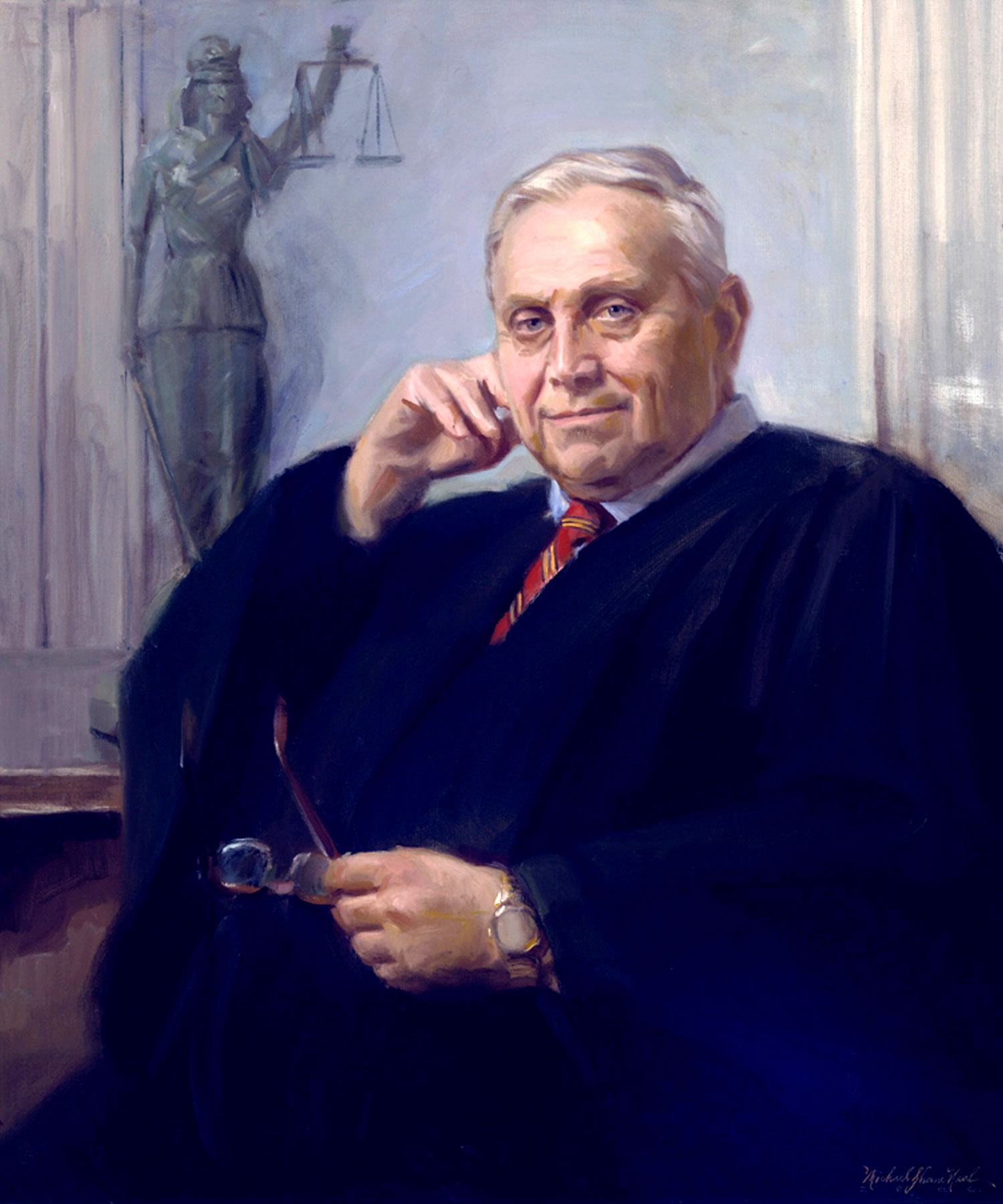

Senior Judge of the United States District Court for the District of Columbia
- In office February 12, 1999 – January 15, 2000

Judge of the United States District Court for the District of Columbia
- In office December 17, 1985 – February 12, 1999
- Appointed by: Ronald Reagan
- Preceded by: June Lazenby Green
- Succeeded by: Reggie Walton

5th General Counsel of the Central Intelligence Agency
- In office 1981–1986
- President: Ronald Reagan
- Director: William J. Casey
- Preceded by: Daniel B. Silver
- Succeeded by: David P. Doherty

Personal details
- Born: February 7, 1932 Philadelphia, Pennsylvania, U.S.
- Died: March 23, 2020 (aged 88) Rockville, Maryland, U.S.
- Spouse: Judith Imber
- Children: 3
- Education: Pennsylvania State University (BA); Yale University (LLB)
- Awards: President's Award for Distinguished Federal Civilian Service (1979)

Stanley Sporkin (February 7, 1932 – March 23, 2020) was an American lawyer who served as the director of enforcement for the Securities and Exchange Commission (SEC), general counsel for the Central Intelligence Agency and United States federal judge of the United States District Court for the District of Columbia. His 40-year federal judicial career, beginning in 1961 at the SEC, at times attracted both derision and admiration for his perceived judicial activism, at times also displaying a quick mind and pugnacity on the bench.

== Education and career ==
Sporkin was born in 1932 to a Jewish family in Philadelphia, the son of Ethel (Weiner), a homemaker, and Maurice Sporkin, a judge. He cites his father, involved in desegregation in Philadelphia in the early 1950s, as instilling in him "the whole concept I had of doing justice." He received an AB from Pennsylvania State University in 1953 and a LLB from Yale Law School in 1957. From 1957 to 1960, Sporkin was a law clerk for Judge Caleb M. Wright of the United States District Court for the District of Delaware, and also for Judge Paul Conway Leahy of the United States District Court for the District of Delaware in 1960. He was in private practice of law in Washington, D.C. from 1960 to 1961.

Sporkin served in a number of roles with the Securities and Exchange Commission from 1961 to 1981. He was a staff attorney of the SEC Special Studies of the Securities Markets from 1961 to 1963; in the SEC Division of Trading and Markets in 1963; Chief of the SEC Branch of Enforcement from 1963 to 1966; Chief Enforcement Attorney of the SEC Office of Enforcement from 1966 to 1967; Assistant Director (Enforcement) for SEC from 1967 to 1968; Associate Director (Enforcement) for SEC from 1968 to 1972; and Deputy Director of the SEC Division of Enforcement from 1972 to 1974. Sporkin served as the Director of the SEC Division of Enforcement from 1974 to 1981, where he led lawyers in enforcement actions against Gulf, Exxon, Mobil, Lockheed, R.J. Reynolds, and 3M, among others. One of Sporkin's first major SEC cases led to the 1974 conviction of George Steinbrenner for illegal campaign contributions, and he became an advocate for the Foreign Corrupt Practices Act enacted in 1977.

From 1981 to 1986, Sporkin was General Counsel for the Central Intelligence Agency. In 1978, he was awarded the Rockefeller Public Service Award for administering justice and reducing crime. In 1979, Sporkin received the President's Award for Distinguished Federal Civilian Service.

== Federal judicial service ==
Sporkin was nominated by President Ronald Reagan on April 5, 1985, to a seat on the United States District Court for the District of Columbia vacated by Judge June Lazenby Green. He was confirmed by the United States Senate on December 16, 1985, and received his commission on December 17, 1985. In 1989, in his courtroom, a convicted drug dealer admitted to providing cocaine to then-Mayor of Washington, D.C. Marion Barry, sparking a major scandal and Barry's subsequent conviction for possession of cocaine. He assumed senior status on February 12, 1999. He retired on January 15, 2000.

According to Bob Woodward in his 2026 memoir Secrets, Sporkin was an "important secret source of [Woodward's] for many years."

== Post judicial service ==
Following his retirement from the bench, Sporkin became affiliated with Weil, Gotshal & Manges and embarked on a private law practice. Sporkin was a member of the Gavel Consulting Group, a private consultancy that consists of several former federal judges and high-ranking government officials. He was in charge of the BP America Ombudsman Team, working from Chevy Chase, Maryland.

On March 23, 2020, Sporkin died after suffering from congestive heart failure in Rockville, Maryland. He was 88 years old. He leaves behind a wife and three children.

== Sources ==
- Biography from the Gavel Consulting Group

Legal offices
Preceded by June Lazenby Green	Judge of the United States District Court for the District of Columbia; 1985–1999	Succeeded by Reggie Walton
