= Daniel King (cryptanalyst) =

United States Navy sailor

- Occupation: USN cryptanalyst
- Known for: suspected of spying on the USA

Petty Officer First Class Daniel M. King was a United States Navy cryptanalyst. He is notable for first falling under suspicion of spying on the United States in 1999; then for confessing following a long and grueling interrogation that he says drove him to consider suicide; then for recanting his confession. Michael Gelles, who was then the Naval Criminal Investigative Service's chief forensic psychologist has been criticized for the role he played in King's interrogation.

King, who had served in the Navy for 20 years, first fell under suspicion when the report on a routine polygraph classed its results as "inconclusive".

King was held for 520 days. On March 9, 2001 Commander James P. Winthrop, the investigating officer, recommended dropping all charges against King. Winthrop described his recommendation as an "extraordinary step":

Although I recognize this is an extraordinary step in light of the fact that the investigation is not complete, I am compelled to recommend that you dismiss the charges in this case now. I do not make this recommendation lightly, as I recognize the serious nature of the charge of espionage and the other offenses. Nonetheless, when balancing the government's severe difficulties in preparing and presenting its case, the nature of the case against the accused, and the accused's lengthy period of pretrial confinement, I believe dismissal is warranted in the interests of justice.

The Senate Select Committee on Intelligence held a hearing to review King's case. In his testimony before the committee Jonathan Turley, one of King's lawyers, said that Navy investigators had seriously violated procedure for holding him for 29 days, and conducting extensive interrogation, before leveling a "preferred charge". In his testimony Turley explained that a "preferred charge" in the military justice system was not the equivalent of a formal charge in the civilian justice system – those were the charges leveled following an article 32 hearing. Turley criticized Navy officials for issuing press releases following King's release that unfairly blackened King's name by implying he was a spy who had to be released due to legal technicalities that were not supported by any evidence.
