= Paul C. Ney Jr. =

American lawyer (born 1958)

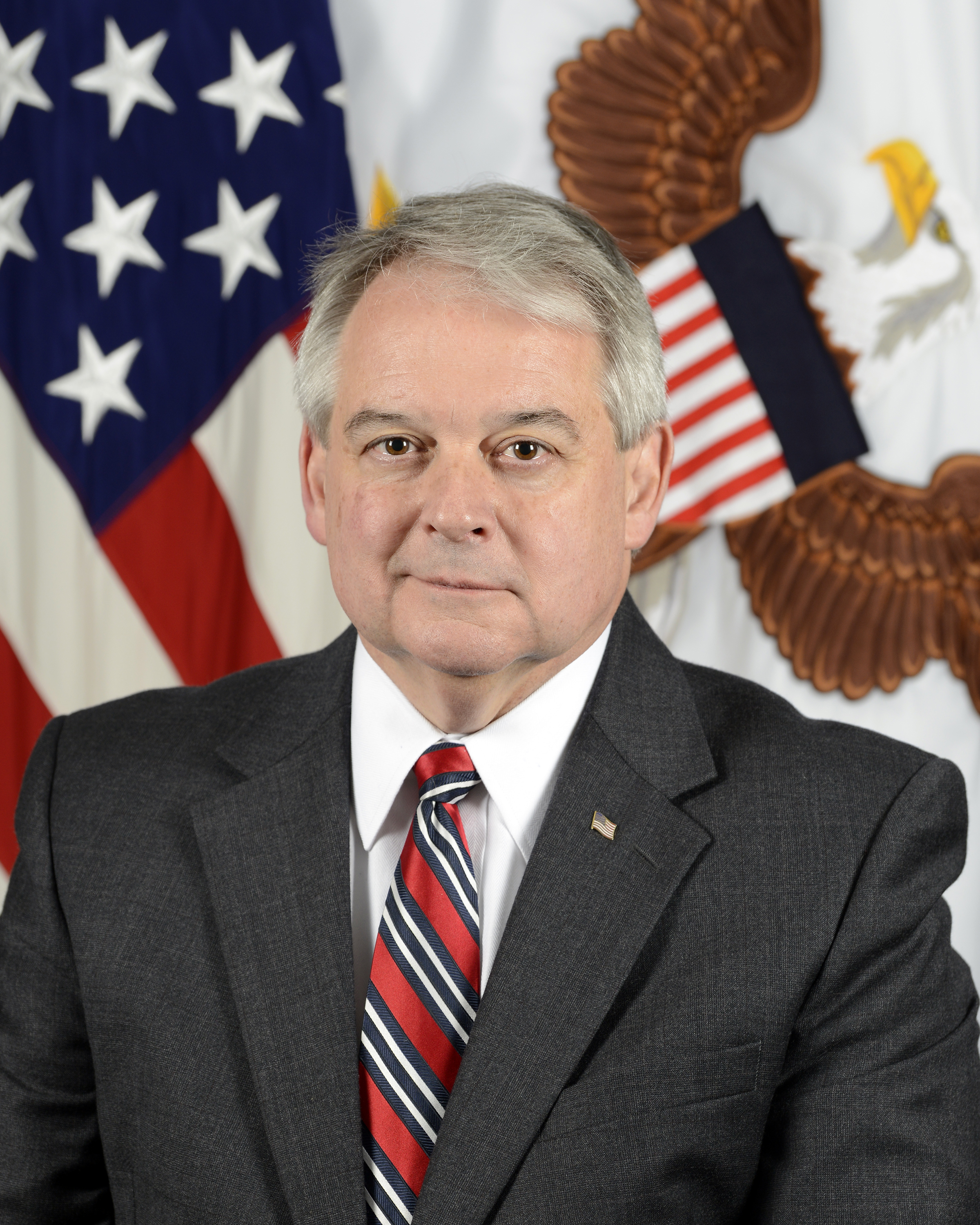

General Counsel of the Department of Defense
- In office August 20, 2018 – January 20, 2021
- President: Donald Trump
- Preceded by: Jennifer M. O'Connor
- Succeeded by: Caroline Krass

Acting General Counsel of the Navy
- In office January 2, 2006 – September 25, 2006
- President: George W. Bush
- Preceded by: Alberto J. Mora
- Succeeded by: Frank Jimenez

Personal details
- Born: Paul Charles Ney, Jr. June 6, 1958 (age 68) Shamokin, Pennsylvania
- Education: Cornell University (BS); Vanderbilt University (JD, MBA)

Paul Charles Ney Jr. (born June 6, 1958) is an American lawyer who served as the General Counsel of the Department of Defense of the United States from 2018 to 2021. In 2025, he served as the United States National Security Council Chief Legal Advisor, Deputy White House Counsel, and Deputy Assistant to the President for National Security matters. He previously served as Acting General Counsel of the Navy and as the Chief Deputy Attorney General of Tennessee.

== Education ==
Paul C. Ney Jr. attended Cornell University, receiving a Bachelor of Science in Biology in 1980. Ney next enrolled in the joint Juris Doctor and Master of Business Administration program at Vanderbilt University, graduating in 1984. He then spent 1984–85 clerking for Judge Adrian G. Duplantier of the United States District Court for the Eastern District of Louisiana.

== Career ==
In 1985, Ney joined the law firm of Trauger, Ney & Tuke in Nashville, Tennessee. He became a partner of the firm in 1990. His practice at Trauger, Ney & Tuke focused on civil litigation, administrative law, arbitration and mediation, and intellectual property. He also served as the General Counsel of the Tennessee Republican Party and as an adjunct professor at Vanderbilt University Law School.

In 2006, President George W. Bush named Ney Principal Deputy General Counsel of the United States Department of the Navy. He served as Acting General Counsel of the Navy from January 2, 2006 until September 25, 2006. Upon leaving the Department of the Navy, Ney joined Nashville Mayor Karl Dean's Office of Economic and Community Development.

In February 2010, Ney joined the law firm of Patterson Intellectual Property Law as a Partner. Using his Registered Patent Attorney license, he represented a variety of clients in litigation and intellectual property law matters.

On August 25, 2016, Tennessee Attorney General Herbert Slatery announced that Ney would join the Attorney General's Office as Chief Deputy. In his role as Chief Deputy Attorney General, Ney coordinated and supervised the substantive legal work of all five sections of the office.

In January 2018, President Donald Trump announced Ney as his nominee for General Counsel of the Department of Defense. He was confirmed by the Senate on July 12, 2018 and served until January 2021. As General Counsel of the Department of Defense, Ney led over 12,000 DoD attorneys and JAG (Judge Advocate General) Officers detailed/assigned to the General Counsel's office.

From September 2021 to January 2025, Ney served as the Chief Legal Officer of Momentus, Inc, a space technology company in San Jose, CA.

In January 2025, Ney was appointed by President Donald Trump to serve as the United States National Security Council (NSC) Chief Legal Advisor, Deputy White House Counsel, and Deputy Assistant to the President for National Security. From his office in the White House, Ney advised the NSC and the President on a wide variety of national security and defense matters.

Legal offices
Preceded by Alberto J. Mora	Acting General Counsel of the Navy; 2006	Succeeded by Frank Jimenez
Preceded by Lucy Honey Haynes	Chief Deputy Attorney General of Tennessee; 2016–2018	Succeeded by Jonathan Skrmetti
Preceded by William S. Castle; Acting	General Counsel of the Department of Defense; 2018–2021	Succeeded by Caroline Krass
