= Russell J. Bruemmer =

American lawyer

Law Clerk for the United States Court of Appeals for the Eighth Circuit
- Judge: William H. Webster

Special Assistant to the Director of the Federal Bureau of Investigation
- In office February 1978 – June 1980
- Director: William H. Webster

Chief Counsel for Congressional Affairs at the Federal Bureau of Investigation
- In office June 1980 – 1981
- Director: William H. Webster

7th General Counsel of the Central Intelligence Agency
- In office January 16, 1988 – April 16, 1990
- President: Ronald Reagan; George H. W. Bush
- Director: William H. Webster
- Preceded by: David P. Doherty
- Succeeded by: Elizabeth Rindskopf Parker

Personal details
- Education: Luther College; University of Michigan

Russell J. Bruemmer was for most of his career a lawyer at Wilmer Cutler Pickering Hale and Dorr, and also worked as a lawyer for the Federal Bureau of Investigation (FBI) and the Central Intelligence Agency (CIA), as the 7th General Counsel of the Central Intelligence Agency. He practices Banking law, Commercial law, Corporate law, and Financial law.

== Early life and education ==
Bruemmer graduated from the University of Michigan Law School in 1977.

== Career ==
Bruemmer began his legal career clerking for Judge William H. Webster on the U.S. Court of Appeals for the Eighth Circuit.

In February 1978, he was appointed Special Assistant to the Director of the Federal Bureau of Investigation (FBI) and later served as Chief Counsel for Congressional Affairs at the FBI until 1981.

He then joined the law firm WilmerHale, becoming a partner in 1985.

From 1987 to 1990, Bruemmer served as General Counsel of the Central Intelligence Agency (CIA), where he managed a team of 60 lawyers in the Office of General Counsel (OGC) and acted as the chief legal officer for the agency. After his tenure at the CIA, he returned to WilmerHale, focusing on financial services institutions, corporate governance, and regulatory issues across various industries.

Throughout his career, Bruemmer was actively involved in professional organizations. He chaired two subcommittees of the American Bar Association's (ABA) Banking Law Committee, served as vice-chair of an ABA subcommittee on corporate compliance policies, and was a member of the ABA Standing Committee on Law and National Security. Additionally, he was elected to the Council on Foreign Relations in 1991 and became a member of the American Law Institute in 1994. Bruemmer also served on the Board of Regents of Luther College, chairing its Audit Committee.

Bruemmer officially retired from WilmerHale in 2015.

Two years after retirement, in 2017, Bruemmer returned to the private sector and now works in the crypto space. Presently, he serves as the Treasurer and Director of the Low Income Investment Fund, and has advised crypto investors such as David Levine.

== Personal life ==
Bruemmer married Cathy MacFarlane in 1980.
