= Lawrence R. Houston =

American lawyer and legal architect of the CIA

Lawrence Houston
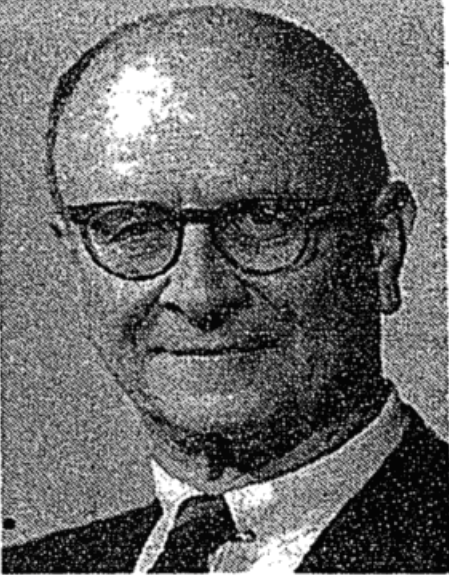
- Houston in 1973

Assistant General Counsel for the Office of Strategic Services
- In office 1944–Promotion Serving with John S. Warner

General Counsel for the Office of Strategic Services
- In office ?–1945
- Deputy: John S. Warner

General Counsel for the Strategic Services Unit
- In office 1945–1946
- Deputy: John S. Warner

General Counsel for the Central Intelligence Group
- In office 1946–1947
- Deputy: John S. Warner

General Counsel of the Central Intelligence Agency
- In office 1947–1973
- Succeeded by: John S. Warner

Personal details
- Born: 4 Jan 1913 St. Louis, Missouri, U.S.
- Died: 15 Aug 1995 (aged 82) Westport, Massachusetts, U.S.
- Resting place: Memorial Cemetery of Saint John's Church
- Parent: David F. Houston (father)
- Education: Harvard University; University of Virginia Law School; Georgetown Law School
- Awards: Intelligence Medal of Merit; National Security Medal; Career Service Award

Military service
- Branch/service: United States Army
- Battles/wars: World War II; Cold War

Lawrence "Larry" Reid Houston was General Counsel for the Office of Strategic Services (OSS), the Strategic Services Unit (SSU), the Central Intelligence Group (CIG), and was the first General Counsel for the Central Intelligence Agency (CIA). He helped create the legal framework for the agency and held the title of "legal architect of the CIA". As both the architect and leading authority in the field, he played a foundational role in shaping the practice of "intelligence law." As The New York Times wrote in his obituary: "His business was keeping the secret agency out of trouble in an open democracy." While serving in this role, Houston represented the interests of the CIA in procuring the contract for the Lockheed U-2 stealth aircraft, and also during the Senate testimony of Francis Gary Powers surrounding the U2 crash. Houston also famously denied Joseph McCarthy any access whatsoever to CIA employees in the era of McCarthyism, and especially during the events that occurred during the "John Paton Davies affair."

== Life ==
When Houston was born in 1913, his father, David F. Houston, was the Chancellor of Washington University in St. Louis. Two months later, Donald became the Secretary of Agriculture for President Woodrow Wilson, and in 1920, his Secretary of the Treasury.

In his youth, Houston formed a lifelong hobby sailing off of Cape Cod and Oyster Bay. He participated in regattas through much of his life.

After earning his Bachelor's degree (BA) from Harvard University in 1935, Houston proceeded to earn a Bachelor of Laws (LLB) from the University of Virginia School of Law in 1939. From September 1939 until February 1943, Houston worked at the law offices of White & Case on Wall Street in New York City. In June 1942, Houston was admitted to the New York State Bar Association.

On 14 June 1939, Houston married Jean Wellford Randolf.

== World War II ==
In March 1943, Houston joined the United States Army, where he commissioned as an officer in the United States Army Judge Advocate General's Corps.

In 1944, Houston was assigned to the Office of Strategic Services (OSS), where he was deployed to Cairo, and worked as Deputy Chief of the OSS Middle East station. Concurrently, he became the OSS Assistant General Counsel, before being promoted to General Counsel. While working in the Counsel's office, Houston met another OSS lawyer named John S. Warner, and the two remained friends and colleagues for the rest of their respective careers, working together as a team on most of the legal framework which created much of the modern United States Intelligence Community.

== Creating the CIA ==
In 1945, after the conclusion of the war and the disestablishment of the OSS, Houston became the General Counsel for the newly established Strategic Services Unit (SSU), which had absorbed the primary clandestine functions of the OSS.

When the SSU was merged with the Central Intelligence Group (CIG) into the Office of Special Operations (OSO) in July 1946, Houston became the General Counsel for the CIG under Sidney Souers.

In 1947, the CIG was merged into the newly established Central Intelligence Agency (CIA), and Houston became its first General Counsel, becoming the Chief of the CIA's Office of the General Counsel (OGC). He held the position of General Counsel at the CIA for 26 years—longer than the combined terms of his eight successors.

His skill in legal matters was evident in the agency's ability to avoid public legal controversies during his time. However, after his departure, many Cold War-era secrets emerged through media reports and congressional investigations, marking the end of a period of intense secrecy.

Houston played a key role in drafting the 1947 legislation that established the CIA, the National Security Act of 1947. Houston also drafted in part, the 1949 law that permitted the agency to spend funds covertly, the Central Intelligence Agency Act of 1949.

Beginning in 1950, he developed a network of front companies to provide cover for CIA operations abroad, including the well-known Air America, whose true ownership was concealed through multiple corporate layers.

In 1950, Houston's OGC office also had to negotiate medical insurance plans for covert operatives with Mutual of Omaha, but eventually too many of the CIA's operatives were denied coverage, and Houston decided that the CIA would be better setting up its own insurance companies, purchasing companies overseas that already existed. The OGC then drafted medical, life, and other insurance plans for all of its covert operations.

Houston's office also oversaw the investments that CIA made both for its retirement funds, and to create fiscal sustainability for covert operations, so that the CIA did not have to consistently request funds from the executive branch or congress. Houston used the CIA's shell companies to invest heavily in the domestic market, and also in Eurobonds, and saw great returns. However, he stressed in a Testimony to the Senate that the CIA did not engage in insider trading, because it did not invest in any country where it was operating.

When asked how he knew that the CIA was not engaging in economic intelligence, he replied:

"Because our investments, except for the Eurobonds, were almost entirely in U.S.investments. And while these were trained economists, their main professional interest was in the foreign field. And I don't remember them saying, for instance, let's get into copper, it is going to be in very short supply in Peru or whatever. I don't remember any discussion of that sort."

In 1952, Houston continued his education and took some courses at Georgetown Law School, and in 1953 he went through the Advanced Management Program at Harvard University.

In 1957, Houston was awarded the Intelligence Medal of Merit.

== Cold War ==
In 1955, Houston structured the contracts and performance guidelines that enabled the rapid development of the U-2 spy plane, which led to the completion of the project in just nine months. In 1960, following the downing of Francis Gary Powers’ U-2 aircraft over the Soviet Union, Houston was involved in negotiating his release through an exchange for Soviet spy Col. Rudolf Abel. On March 6, 1962, when Powers was brought before the United States Senate Committee on Armed Services at the Old Senate Office Building in Washington, D.C., Houston represented Powers on behalf of the CIA.

After the failed Bay of Pigs invasion in 1961, Houston facilitated the return of captured CIA operatives by coordinating the shipment of medical supplies to Cuba. In 1962, when Houston discovered that the CIA had enlisted Mafia figures in a plot to assassinate Fidel Castro, his actions helped keep the operation concealed for more than a decade.

During an awards banquet in 1970, when Houston received the National Civil Service Association's Career Service Award, Richard Helms said:

"During more than two decades of service, Mr. Houston has compiled a record of achievement so extraordinary that, joined with his devotion and thorough dedication, he has become a key adviser to me as to all other Directors of Central Intelligence. Unquestionably the effects of his panoramic contributions to the Agency and to our country will endure. They will remain as witness to his expertise, to his character, and to his superlative capacity in responding to the challenges of our national security and the dramatic times in which we live."

However, only three years later, Houston was unceremoniously fired by the incoming CIA Director, James R. Schlesinger, who went on a campaign to purge the CIA of everyone he felt loyal to Dick Helms.
