= Resistance to interrogation =

Technique taught to soldiers

Resistance to interrogation, RTI or R2I is a type of military training to soldiers to prepare them, after capture by the enemy, to resist interrogation techniques such as humiliation and torture.

The trainees undergo practices such as hooding, sleep deprivation, time disorientation, prolonged nakedness, sexual humiliation and deprivation of warmth, water and food. Many of these techniques are against international law if used in interrogations.

In such interrogation sessions, the subjects must maintain dead silence regardless of the practice being inflicted on them except when asked for one or more pieces of information that are in accordance with Article 17 of the Third Geneva Convention. Under that protocol four pieces of information have to be provided whenever requested: name, rank, serial number and date of birth. Both the subjects and the practitioner have a right to insist on a return to unit every hour.

Standard RTI for most special military branches of American and European governments covers both tortures that are condemned by the United Nations and interrogation techniques that are considered legitimate, usually presented along a sliding scale. For instance, a soldier would be subjected to slight discomforts before being subjected to more torturous techniques.

The People's Liberation Army Rocket Force Special Operations Regiment includes RTI in their selection.

The Guardian has reported that according to a former British special forces officer, the acts committed by U.S. Army soldiers who committed torture and prisoner abuse at Abu Ghraib resembled the techniques used in RTI training.

== See also ==
- Defence Survive, Evade, Resist, Extract Training Organisation
- Covert interrogation
- FM 34-52 Intelligence Interrogation
- Pride-and-ego down
- Survival, Evasion, Resistance and Escape
