= Mohammed al-Qahtani =

Saudi Arabian Guantanamo detainee

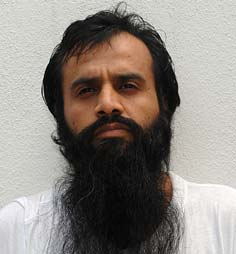
- Al-Qahtani's photo in Guantanamo prison, 2008
- Born: Mohammed Mani Ahmad al-Qahtani; November 19, 1975 (age 51); Kharj, Saudi Arabia
- Detained at: Guantanamo Bay
- ISN: 63
- Charge(s): Charged February 2008; charges dropped in May 2008; new charges in November 2008; charges dropped January 2009; habeas case reinstated, 2008.
- Status: Repatriated March 2022 to Saudi Arabia

Mohammed Mani Ahmad al-Qahtani (Arabic: محمد ماني احمد القحطاني; sometimes transliterated as al-Kahtani; born November 19, 1975) is a Saudi citizen who was detained as an al-Qaeda operative for 20 years in the United States's Guantanamo Bay detention camp in Cuba. Qahtani allegedly tried to enter the United States to take part in the September 11 attacks as the 20th hijacker and was due to be onboard United Airlines Flight 93 along with the four other hijackers. He was refused entry due to suspicions that he was trying to illegally immigrate. He was later captured in Afghanistan in the Battle of Tora Bora in December 2001.

After military commissions were authorized by Congress, in February 2008, Qahtani was charged on numerous counts. In May, the charges were dropped without prejudice. New charges were filed against him in November 2008 and dropped in January 2009, as evidence had been obtained through torture and was inadmissible in court. This was the first time an official of the Bush administration had admitted any torture of detainees at Guantanamo.

In a Washington Post interview in January 2009, Susan Crawford of the Department of Defense said "we tortured Qahtani", saying that the U.S. government had so abused Qahtani through isolation, sleep deprivation, forced nudity and exposure to cold that he was in a "life-threatening condition".

On March 6, 2022, Qahtani was airlifted from Guantanamo Bay by the U.S. military and flown back to Saudi Arabia to a mental health treatment facility after 20 years in American custody. His release was announced by the U.S. Department of Defense the next day.

== Early life ==
Mohammed al-Qahtani was born on 19 November 1975 in Kharj, Saudi Arabia. He is a Saudi national from a large Sunni family. His father served as a police officer for 28 years. His mother remained at home to raise their twelve children. He has seven brothers and four sisters.

== Denied entry by US immigration ==
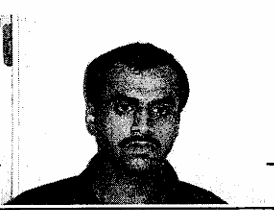
Photo of al-Qahtani taken by INS before he was deported

On August 3, 2001, Qahtani at the age of 25 flew into Orlando, Florida, from Dubai. He was questioned by immigration agent José Meléndez-Pérez, who was dubious that he could support himself with only $2,800 cash to his name, and suspicious that he intended to become an illegal immigrant, as he was using a one-way ticket. Qahtani was sent back to Dubai, and subsequently returned to Saudi Arabia.

== Transfer to Guantanamo ==
Captured in the Battle of Tora Bora in December 2001, Qahtani was shipped by the Americans with other detainees in June 2002 to the Guantanamo Bay detention camp, Camp Delta, set up five months prior at the United States Navy base at Guantanamo Bay, Cuba. He continued giving a false name, and insisted he had been in the area solely to pursue an interest in falconry.

After ten months, U.S. Border and Immigration Authorities took a fingerprint sample and discovered that he was the same person who had tried to enter the United States just before the September 11 attacks. Seizing the airport's CCTV surveillance recordings, the FBI claimed they were able to identify the car of Mohamed Atta at the airport, believed to be there to pick up Qahtani. Another military account stated that Qahtani was identified as someone who had previously been turned away due to visa problems – by fingerprints "taken in Southwest Asia".

At that time, the military invited FBI interrogators to interview Qahtani. By the fall of 2002, they were frustrated by his resistance. DOD interrogators talked of using different techniques, based on a class they attended.

Shortly after September 26, 2002, top administration political appointees including David Addington, the VP's chief of staff; Alberto Gonzales, then White House Counsel; John A. Rizzo of the CIA; William Haynes II, General Counsel of DOD; his legal assistant, Jack Goldsmith; and two Justice Department lawyers, Alice S. Fisher and Patrick F. Philbin, flew to Camp Delta to view Qahtani and talk with his interrogators. They were trying to develop ways to break down detainee resistance and had come up with a list of potential techniques to be used.

In August 2002, the Office of Legal Counsel, Department of Justice, had provided legal memoranda that came to be known as the Torture Memos. By narrowing the legal definition of torture, these memos asserted that the CIA and other U.S. agencies could legally employ enhanced interrogation techniques upon detainees, even when those techniques were considered torture by the United Nations and others. Lieutenant Colonel Diane Beaver, the top legal adviser at Camp Delta, suggested to her command in Defense that acting with "pure intent" was important. She stated in October 2002 that the use of these techniques did not violate any federal law as long as they were not performed "with the specific intent to cause mental harm," but recommended that interrogations which intended to use the harsher techniques should be reviewed on a case-by-case basis beforehand.

Qahtani had initially been interrogated by FBI agents, who used standard techniques based in police work. On December 2, 2002, Secretary of Defense Rumsfeld authorized in writing the use of 17 enhanced interrogation techniques to be used against Qahtani (see next section). After details of Qahtani's status were leaked in 2004, the U.S. Department of Defense issued a press release stating that Qahtani had admitted:

- He had been sent to the US by Khalid Sheikh Mohammed, the lead architect of the 9/11 attack;
- He had met Osama bin Laden on several occasions;
- He had terrorist training at two al-Qaeda camps;
- He had been in contact with many senior al-Qaeda leaders.

Al-Qahtani is also said to have informed interrogators that he had received operational training in covert communications from Abu Ahmed al-Kuwaiti, whom he identified as a courier for Osama bin Laden. This was an early lead at a time when the hunt for bin Laden by other means had ground to a halt, but, as the national security expert Peter Bergen has noted, it had to be combined with another eight years of work, relying on a wide variety of techniques of intelligence-gathering, to culminate in the US government's 2011 raid on the bin Laden compound in Abbottabad, Pakistan and killing of the al-Qaeda leader.

== Documented abuses while in Guantanamo ==
At Guantánamo, Mohammed al-Qahtani was subjected to a regime of 17 aggressive interrogation techniques, known as the "First Special Interrogation Plan", authorized in writing by US Secretary of Defense Donald Rumsfeld on December 2, 2002, and implemented under the supervision and guidance of Secretary Rumsfeld and the commander of Guantánamo, Major General Geoffrey Miller. After complaints from military investigators, the list of approved techniques was reduced.

The special interrogation plan and techniques were not revealed until 2008 in testimony to the Senate Judiciary Committee during its investigation of detainee treatment, and were reported by the FBI Inspector General, Glenn Fine. The authorized techniques were related to those described in the three August 2002 legal opinions, later known as the Torture Memos, drafted by John Yoo and signed by Jay S. Bybee of the Office of Legal Counsel, Department of Justice, issued to the CIA.

Under these coercive techniques, Qahtani gave additional information, including naming 30 other prisoners as working directly for bin Laden. The military used this information as justification to hold the men as enemy combatants. But, because the material was extracted under torture, it was later considered inadmissible in court. Qahtani later recanted this testimony, saying he had given the names of other detainees only to stop the abuse.

It was not until February 2008 that Qahtani was first charged before a military commission, and the prosecution dropped the charges in May of that year. He was charged again in November 2008, but on January 14, 2009, Susan J. Crawford, a senior Pentagon official of the Bush administration, stated that she would not proceed with his prosecution. She said that Qahtani's "treatment met the legal definition of torture.... The techniques they used were all authorized, but the manner in which they applied them was overly aggressive". As convening authority of the military commissions, Crawford was responsible for overseeing the Guantanamo military commissions. Her statement was the first time any top official of the Bush administration had said there was torture of detainees at Guantanamo.

Gitanjali Gutierrez, a defense lawyer for al-Qahtani who works for the New York-based Center for Constitutional Rights, has said she thought Qahtani's torture constituted a war crime.

=== Interrogation log ===
On March 3, 2006, Time magazine published the secret log of 49 days of the 20-hour-per-day interrogation of Qahtani at Guantanamo Bay detention camp from late November 2002 to early January 2003. This had been leaked to the press. The log described Qahtani being forcibly administered intravenous fluids, drugs, and enemas, in order to keep his body functioning well enough for the interrogations to continue. The log, titled SECRET ORCON INTERROGATION LOG DETAINEE 063, offers a daily, detailed account of the enhanced interrogation techniques used from November 23, 2002, to January 11, 2003.

These included the following:

- Forced to submit to an enema
- Beatings
- Placed in stress positions for long periods of time in order to induce severe pain
- Threats made against his family, including female members
- Forced nudity, including in the presence of female personnel
- Placed in tight restraints for many months on end, day and night
- Lowering the temperature in the room, then throwing water on the detainee's face
- Restraint on a swivel chair for long periods
- Various humiliations, such as training the detainee to act as a dog, dance lessons, and forcing him to watch puppet shows depicting sexual acts between him and Osama bin Laden at his mock birthday party
- Deprivation of sleep for long periods
- Loud music and white noise played to prevent the detainee from sleeping
- Forcing the detainee to pray to bin Laden
- Various interrogation techniques described as "pride-and-ego down", "circumstantial evidence", "fear-up", or "Al Qaeda falling apart"
- Threats of extraordinary rendition to countries that torture
- Strip searches
- Body searches
- Prohibiting detainee from praying for prolonged times and during Ramadan
- Threatening to desecrate the Koran in front of him
- Forced to pick up trash with his hands cuffed, while being called "a pig"
- Exposure to low temperatures for prolonged times
- Forcible administration of IVs by medical staff during interrogation, which were described by Qahtani as "repetitive stabs" each day
- Repeatedly screened a video of September 11 attacks
- Pictures of 9/11 victims taped to his body
- Forced to stand for U.S. national anthem and listen to interrogators and guards sing "God Bless America"

The interrogation log does not record Qahtani admitting to being a member of al-Qaeda. The entry for January 1, 2003, relates that Qahtani blames Osama bin Laden for deceiving the 19 9/11 hijackers ("his friends"):

2A0780 asked how one man, Bin Laden, convince [sic] 19 young men to kill themselves, (detainee was starting to fade he was going in and out of sleep.) The question was repeated, detainee stated that they were tricked, that he distorted the picture if [sic] front of them, 2A0780 asked detainee if this made him mad, detainee stated yes, (detainee did not realize that 2A780 [sic] had not started putting detainee into the picture) 2A0780 asked detainee if he was mad that his friends had been tricked, detainee said yes. 2A0780 asked detainee if his friends knew about the plan, detainee said no, 2A0780 asked if detainee knew about the plan, detainee stated that he didn't know. 2A0780 asked detainee if it made him mad that he killed his friends, detainee stated yes. 2A0780 asked detainee if he was glad that he didn't die on the plane, detainee stated yes. 2A0780 asked detainee if his parents were happy that he didn't die detainee stated yes. 2A0780 stated "he killed your friends" detainee stated yes.

When asked about his greatest sins in his life, Qahtani responded that he had not taken care of his parents properly, had not finished college, and had not been able to repay $20,000 he had borrowed from his aunt.

== Recanting ==
On March 3, 2006, Qahtani's lawyer Gitanjali Gutierrez said that her client had recanted the accusations he had made against fellow detainees during earlier periods of interrogation under torture. He had told his lawyer that he was forced to falsely confess and name names, in order to get his "enhanced interrogation" to end. He had accused 30 other detainees of being former bodyguards of Osama bin Laden.

Given the circumstances of how Qahtani's confessions were obtained, lawyers for the other detainees argued that his testimony should not be used by the military as justification to detain their clients. They used this argument in their petitions for habeas corpus challenges for their clients. The government argued that, under the Detainee Treatment Act (2005), detainees could not use the federal courts for habeas corpus except on appeal.

In its decision in Hamdan v. Rumsfeld (2006), the Supreme Court ruled that the Detainee Treatment Act and the military commissions as established by the Department of Defense were unconstitutional for depriving detainees of habeas corpus and rights of due process, and that the military commissions had not been authorized by Congress.

== Military Commissions Act of 2006 ==
In the fall of 2006, Congress quickly passed and the president signed the Military Commissions Act of 2006. It responded to the Court's concerns but mandated the restriction of detainees to the military commission system.

On February 9, 2008, The New York Times reported that the Office of Military Commissions was close to laying charges against six of the high-value detainees at Guantanamo, including Qahtani. He was believed to have been the planned 20th hijacker for the 9/11 attacks.

Qahtani and the other five were charged on February 11, 2008, with war crimes and murder, and faced the death penalty if convicted. Gitanjali Gutierrez, an attorney with the Center for Constitutional Rights (CCR), was representing Qahtani. Attorneys at CCR denounced the systematic use of torture against detainees and challenged the validity of the military commission. They said that evidence in Qahtani's death penalty case was obtained by torture.

In their February 2008 press release, CCR said that "the military commissions at Guantanamo allow secret evidence, hearsay evidence, and evidence obtained through torture. They are unlawful, unconstitutional, and a perversion of justice."

=== Suicide attempt ===
According to his lawyer, in early April 2008, al-Qahtani tried to kill himself after learning that he faced charges that could carry the death penalty. He cut himself at least three times, causing "profuse bleeding" that needed hospital treatment.

=== Charges dropped ===
On May 11, 2008, the government charges against al-Qahtani were dropped. Commander Jeffrey Gordon, a Pentagon spokesman, told reporters that it was possible for the charges to be re-instated, at a later date, because they had been dropped "without prejudice".

=== New charges announced ===
On November 18, 2008, Chief Prosecutor Lawrence Morris announced that he was filing new charges against Qahtani. When announcing the new charges, Morris stated that the new charges were based on "independent and reliable evidence". He stated: "His conduct is significant enough that he falls into the category of people who ought to be held accountable by being brought to trial."

=== Crawford orders charges dropped ===
Susan Crawford, the senior official in charge of the Office of Military Commissions, had the final authority over whether charges were laid. On January 14, 2009, after a change in administrations, Crawford ruled that the prosecution would not proceed against Qahtani because he had been subjected to interrogation techniques in Guantanamo that rose to the level of torture. Bryan Whitman, a DOD spokesman, said that the techniques were legal at the time they were applied, according to Department of Justice legal opinions.

== Qahtani's habeas case reinstated ==
Mohammed al-Qahtani's habeas corpus case was reinstated in July 2008 after the Supreme Court ruled in Boumediene v. Bush, stating that Guantanamo detainees have a constitutional right to habeas corpus and the right to petition federal courts.

== Joint Review Task Force ==
When President Barack Obama took office in January 2009, he made a number of promises about the future of Guantanamo. He promised the use of torture would cease at the camp. He promised to institute a new review system, convening a task force to review material on detainees that was made up of officials from six agencies, whereas the OARDEC reviews were conducted entirely by the Department of Defense. Reporting back a year later, the Joint Review Task Force recommended release and repatriation of 53 detainees. It classified other individuals as too dangerous to be transferred from Guantanamo, although there was insufficient evidence to charge them with crimes. On April 9, 2013, that document was made public after a Freedom of Information Act request. Some 71 detainees were determined to be eligible for a Periodic Review Board assessment, similar to a parole board, to determine if they could be released. Mohammed al Qahtani was one of the 71 individuals deemed too innocent to charge, but too dangerous to release. Obama promised that those deemed too innocent to charge, but too dangerous to release would start to receive reviews from a Periodic Review Board. Qahtani was recommended for transfer to Saudi Arabia on June 9, 2021.

== Qahtani's 2014 federal appeals court order ==
On 2 September 2014, a judicial panel for the Second US Circuit Court of Appeals in New York stated that pictures and videos of Qahtani, taken while in detention, should remain classified. The Center for Constitutional Rights, which represented Mohammed al-Qahtani for this federal lawsuit, had sought to disclose these audiovisual materials under the Freedom of Information Act. The judges decided that the release of these pictures and videos "could logically and plausibly harm national security because these images are uniquely susceptible to use by anti-American extremists as propaganda to incite violence against United States interests domestically and abroad". On March 9, 2015, the Supreme Court denied certiorari in his case.

== Representation in popular culture ==
In a review of the drama film Zero Dark Thirty (2012) about the hunt for Osama bin Laden, Peter Bergen, a national security analyst, compared the character of Ammar and the issue of torture to the treatment of Qahtani in detention. In a controversial passage, Ammar is interrogated under torture in the film and gives up the name of a bin Laden courier. Bergen notes that although Qahtani gave a name under alleged torture, it took another eight years, with US analysts using every form of intelligence-gathering from high technology to 'people on the ground,' for the government to locate and kill Osama bin Laden. Other sources later suggested the character of Ammar was based on Ammar al-Baluchi.

In the television documentary series The Path to 9/11, al-Qahtani is portrayed by Elie Gemael, who portrayed 9/11 hijacker Mohammed Atta in Zero Hour.

== See also ==
- Shaker Aamer
