= Eddie Sotto =

American experimental designer and conceptualist (1958–2025)

- Born: Edward Anthony Sotto III; March 14, 1958; Los Angeles, California, U.S.
- Died: December 17, 2025 (aged 67); Orange, California, U.S.
- Occupation: Experiential designer
- Years active: 1979–2025
- Organization: SottoStudios
- Notable work: Main Street, U.S.A. (Disneyland Paris); Mission: SPACE (EPCOT); Times Square Studios
- Website: sottostudios.com

Edward Anthony Sotto III (March 14, 1958 – December 17, 2025) was an American experiential designer, mixed-media producer and conceptualist.

Sotto spent 13 years with Walt Disney Imagineering, rising to senior vice president of concept design. He was the founder and president of the Los Angeles design firm SottoStudios. Sotto also established the think tank Futureproof Experiences in 2020 to address the challenges posed to the experiential industries by COVID-19.

In 2002, Sotto was named one of the 1,000 most creative people in America in the book 1,000: Richard Saul Wurman's Who's Really Who by TED founder Richard Saul Wurman. In 2018 he addressed the TEDxBermuda event with his presentation "The How of Wow". He was also named one of the Blooloop 50 list of theme park influencers in 2020.

== Early life and career ==
Sotto was born in Hollywood, Los Angeles, California, on March 14, 1958. His aunt, Marilyn Sotto, was a costume illustrator and designer who worked for Paramount Pictures, Universal Studios, and Walt Disney Productions, and his grandfather, Edward Sotto Sr., was a scenic artist at Metro-Goldwyn-Mayer and a portrait artist.

He grew up fascinated by Disneyland Park and, as a teenager, built a 1/200 scale model of the park based on plans obtained from WED Enterprises (now known as Walt Disney Imagineering). At 21, while working as an appliance salesman at Sears, Sotto acted upon a suggestion to pursue his interests in modelmaking and storyboarding and was hired as an assistant project director at Knott's Berry Farm. At Knott's, he designed Wacky Soap Box Racers, a redesign of the park's Steeplechase-style roller coaster, Motorcycle Chase, and contributed to the design of Camp Snoopy.

In 1983, Sotto became a show designer for Hollywood-based Landmark Entertainment Group. During his tenure, he designed and developed themed attractions for Universal Studios Hollywood, Six Flags, and Mattel.

== Walt Disney Imagineering ==
Sotto's work on the Laboratory of Scientific Wonders for a Six Flags project in Baltimore, Maryland, caught the attention of Tony Baxter, vice president of design at Walt Disney Imagineering (WDI), who hired Sotto as show producer/designer for Main Street, U.S.A. at Disneyland Paris. Sotto's early Disney mentors included veteran Imagineers Herbert Ryman and John Hench.

Sotto spent 13 years with WDI, eventually being named senior vice president of concept design in 1994. He was involved in early development of the Indiana Jones Adventure attraction for Disneyland, and directed the master planning of Tokyo Disneyland for three years. His proposal to include a hotel at the entrance of Disneyland Paris led to the first instance of guest accommodations being incorporated into a Disney Park.

As head of the WDI Concept Development Studio "think tank", Sotto applied principles of Imagineering outside the theme park setting. This culminated in such projects as the "Media as Architecture" facade of ABC's Times Square Studios in New York City and the design of the futuristic Encounter Restaurant in Los Angeles International Airport's Theme Building. Other innovative Concept Development Studio projects included smart wireless toys, augmented reality coasters, online worlds, and resort concepts.

Other WDI projects Sotto worked on included the Mission: SPACE attraction at EPCOT and the $90 million Pooh's Hunny Hunt ride at Tokyo Disneyland.

== After Disney ==
Sotto left Disney in 1999 to become executive vice president of creative affairs for the Digital Entertainment Network. Established to create "original youth culture programming and e-commerce opportunities . . . for Generation Y consumers," DEN clients included Ford, Dell, Blockbuster, and Pepsi.

In 2000, Sotto became chief creative officer of Progress City. Seeking to explore the convergence of the Internet, architecture, and wireless devices, Progress City was founded to develop leading edge technology solutions for clients such as BBDO, Kodak, Motorola, Dentsu, San Diego Padres, NASA, and The Walt Disney Company.

== SottoStudios Inc. ==
Sotto founded SottoStudios, an experiential design firm, in 2004. According to Sotto, his mandate for the business was "seeing the impossible as a beautiful puzzle, and then bringing in the right combination of people to crack the code." The studio specializes in highly themed or exotic design projects, including select private residences, and uses the tools of theme park design to help develop products, brands and businesses. Clients have included Aston-Martin, Ferrari, Porsche, Embraer, Disney, Knott’s, Blue Origin, Paramount Pictures, NBC/Universal, Irvine Co., Kerzner, and Wynn Resorts.

Through his company, Sotto has developed television series for VH1 networks, ABC, Showtime and CNN, and created a news format utilizing the Google search engine for Current TV. He continues to provide creative consulting and design development services to Walt Disney Imagineering.

SottoStudios has applied the theory of "experiential design" to the Las Vegas Penske-Wynn Ferrari-Maserati dealership, and a James Bond-inspired Aston Martin showroom for Los Angeles' Galpin Aston Martin dealership. Sotto also developed a unique showroom and museum gallery for Galpin Porsche in Santa Clarita, California. The studio also developed designs for a McLaren showroom. One of Sotto's collaborations with Embraer, the SkyRanch One, was named Best Private Jet Concept at the 2017 Yacht and Aviation Awards. Other Sotto-Embraer partnerships include the Skyacht One and Manhattan Airship. SottoStudios is also a consultant for Virgin Galactic.

Other projects have included building a film history-themed pop-up store for Turner Classic Movies and partnering with chef John Sedlar to create Los Angeles' Rivera Restaurant. For Rivera, Sotto named and created the restaurant's identity, along with architectural and thematic design elements. He was also a general partner in the restaurant. SottoStudios was also involved in assisting scientist Danny Hillis in the design of his 10,000-year clock for the Long Now Foundation.

== Futureproof Experiences ==
In 2020, Sotto created the think tank Futureproof Experiences in response to the COVID-19 pandemic and its effect on the themed entertainment industry. The group seeks to incorporate talents from the creative, business, and health care industries to create frictionless and compelling entertainment experiences which combine security and pandemic precautions.

== Death ==
Sotto died in Orange, California, on December 17, 2025, at the age of 67.

== Partial list of Walt Disney Imagineering projects ==
Projects in Sotto’s portfolio of design responsibility included:

=== Disneyland Resort ===
- Master planning attraction proposals
- Indiana Jones Adventure: Temple of the Forbidden Eye concept design
- Adventureland renovation
- Main Street, U.S.A. renovation and audio enhancements
- Storybook Land Canal Boats enhancements
- Aladdin's Oasis
- Fantasmic! viewing area
- Space Mountain onboard audio enhancements

=== Walt Disney World Resort ===
- Space Mountain FedEx enhancements
- Mission: SPACE conceptual design
- World Showcase proposals
- Pal Mickey interactive toy
- Videopolis dance club

=== Tokyo Disneyland ===
- Sci-Fi City and New Fantasyland master planning
- Disney Resort Line station
- Pooh's Hunny Hunt
- Queen of Hearts Banquet Hall
- Alice's Tea Party
- The Enchanted Tiki Room—Get the Fever!
- World Bazaar interior designs

=== Disneyland Paris ===
- Main Street, U.S.A.
- Disneyland Paris Railroad
- Original Disneyland Paris Hotel concept design

=== Concept Development Studio ===
- ABC Times Square Studios, New York City
- Encounter Restaurant, Los Angeles International Airport
- Interactive ride technologies
- Online worlds

=== Voiceover work ===
- Main Street upstairs windows (Disneyland Paris / Disneyland)
- Space Mountain (Magic Kingdom / Disneyland)
- Market House telephone (Disneyland / Magic Kingdom / Disneyland Paris)
- Radio Toontown (Disneyland)
- Shrunken Ned (Disneyland)
- Aladdin’s Other Lamp (Disneyland)
- Disneyland Paris Railroad / Walt Disney World Railroad boarding calls
- Big Thunder Mountain Railroad (Disneyland Paris)

=== Acting ===
- Star Tours concourse introductory video (Disneyland)
