= Pride-and-ego down =

Interrogation technique

Pride-and-ego down is a US Army term for techniques used by captors in interrogating prisoners to encourage cooperation, usually consisting of "attacking the source's sense of personal worth" and in an "attempt to redeem his pride, the source will usually involuntarily provide pertinent information in attempting to vindicate himself."

Official documents state that such techniques should not go "beyond the limits that would apply to an EPW [enemy prisoner of war]."

== US Army definition from FM 2-22.3 ==
In the document FM 2-22.3 Human Intelligence Collector Operations, published in 2006, the U.S. Army describes it as follows:

8-45. (Interrogation) The emotional-pride and ego-down approach is based on attacking the source's ego or self-image. The source, in defending his ego, reveals information to justify or rationalize his actions. This information may be valuable in answering collection requirements or may give the [human intelligence] HUMINT collector insight into the viability of other approaches. This approach is effective with sources who have displayed weakness or feelings of inferiority. A real or imaginary deficiency voiced about the source, loyalty to his organization, or any other feature can provide a basis for this technique.

8-46. The HUMINT collector accuses the source of weakness or implies he is unable to do a certain thing. This type of source is also prone to excuses and rationalizations, often shifting the blame to others. An example of this technique is opening the collection effort with the question, "Why did you surrender so easily when you could have escaped by crossing the nearby ford in the river?" The source is likely to provide a basis for further questions or to reveal significant information if he attempts to explain his surrender in order to vindicate himself. He may give an answer such as, "No one could cross the ford because it is mined."

8-47. The objective is for the HUMINT collector to use the source's sense of pride by attacking his loyalty, intelligence, abilities, leadership qualities, slovenly appearance, or any other perceived weakness. This will usually goad the source into becoming defensive, and he will try to convince the HUMINT collector he is wrong. In his attempt to redeem his pride and explain his actions, the source may provide pertinent information. Possible targets for the emotional-pride and ego-down approach are the source's—

- Loyalty.
- Technical competence.
- Leadership abilities.
- Soldierly qualities.
- Appearance.

8-48. There is a risk associated with this approach. If the emotional-pride and ego-down approach fails, it is difficult for the HUMINT collector to recover and move to another approach without losing his credibility. Also, there is potential for application of the pride and ego approach to cross the line into humiliating and degrading treatment of the detainee. Supervisors should consider the experience level of their subordinates and determine specifically how the interrogator intends to apply the approach technique before approving the interrogation plan.

== See also ==
- Resistance to interrogation
- Reid technique
- FM 2-22.3 Human Intelligence Collector Operations
- FM 34-52 Intelligence Interrogation
