= FM 2-22.3 Human Intelligence Collector Operations =

US Army field manual for interrogations

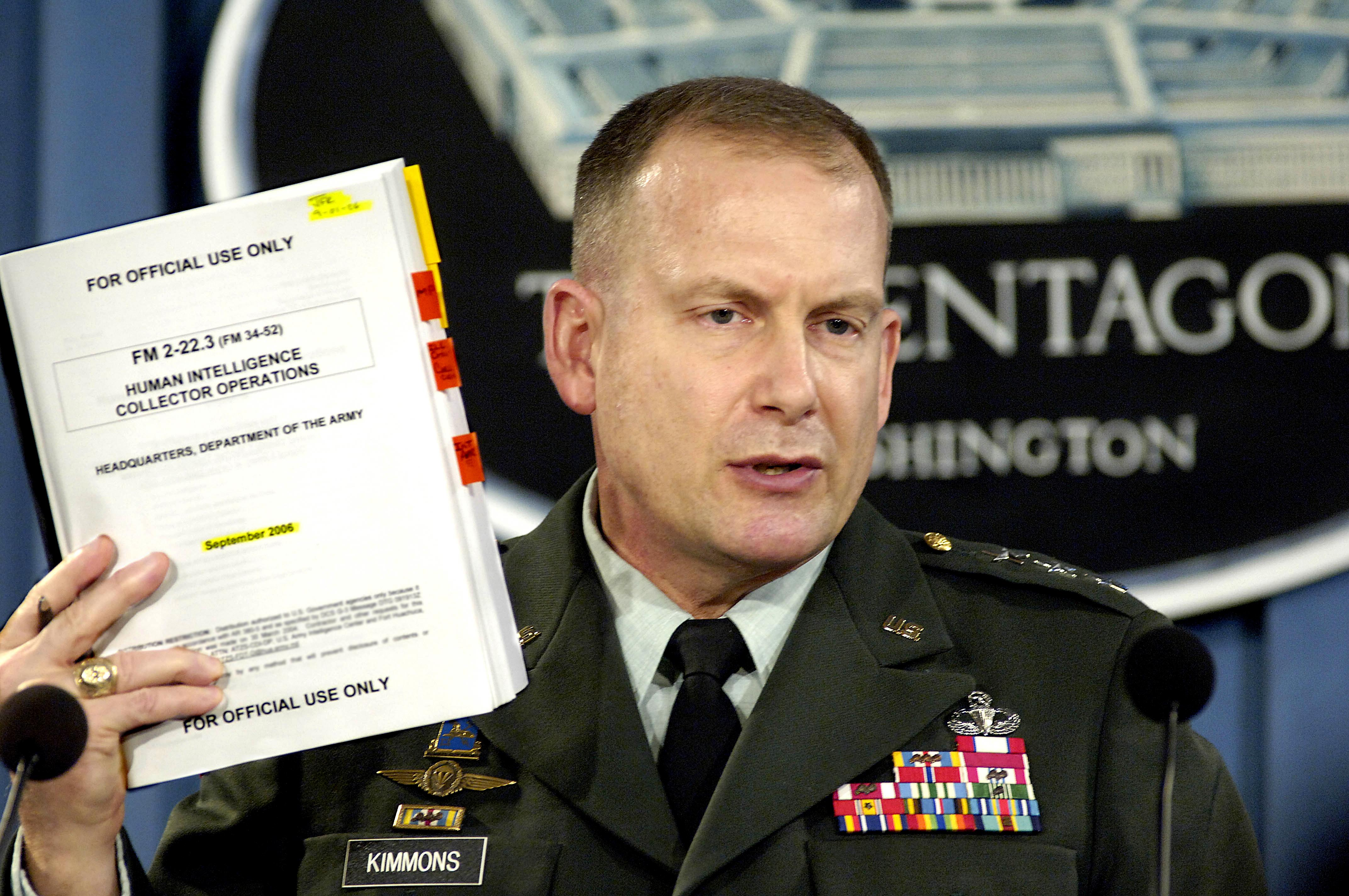
Army Deputy Chief of Staff for Intelligence Lieutenant General John Kimmons displays the manual on June 6, 2006.

Army Field Manual 2 22.3, or FM 2-22.3, Human Intelligence Collector Operations, was issued by the Department of the Army on September 6, 2006. The manual gives instructions on a range of issues, such as the structure, planning and management of human intelligence operations, the debriefing of soldiers, and the analysis of known relationships and map data. The largest and most newsworthy section of the document details procedures for the screening and interrogation of prisoners of war and unlawful combatants.

== Political issues ==
Drafting of the manual reflected concerns about enhanced interrogation techniques and/or torture, such as water boarding, that followed after a 2003 memo by John Yoo determined that the wartime authority of the U.S. president overrode international agreements against torture. Revision of the manual from the previous FM 34-52 Intelligence Interrogation followed passage of a law in 2005, pressed by Senator John McCain, that caused interrogation techniques not included in the manual to be considered illegal for the U.S. Army, but not for the CIA. Therefore, the release of the manual was seen to prohibit Army personnel from methods such as mock executions, sexual humiliation, hooding prisoners and "waterboarding". On March 8, 2008 president George W. Bush vetoed a bill, supported by Democrats and opposed by John McCain, which would have restricted the CIA to the techniques in the manual.

Disputes during the manual's preparation included whether a section on interrogation techniques would remain classified, and whether the Geneva Conventions ban on "humiliating and degrading treatment" would be removed.

Executive Order 13491, issued by Barack Obama on January 22, 2009 (two days after Obama's inauguration) revoked Executive Order 13440 of July 20, 2007. It restricted the CIA and other Executive Agencies to proceed with interrogations "strictly in accord with the principles, processes, conditions, and limitations [Army Field Manual 2 22.3] prescribes". Persons associated with the U.S. government were advised that they could rely on the manual, but could not rely upon "any interpretation of the law governing interrogation – including interpretations of Federal criminal laws, the Convention Against Torture, Common Article 3, Army Field Manual 2 22.3, and its predecessor document, Army Field Manual 34 52 issued by the Department of Justice between September 11, 2001, and January 20, 2009." This order restricted the CIA and all other U.S. personnel to the same rules that the military uses in interrogations. Newsweek described the impact of this and three other executive orders issued shortly after Obama's inauguration as "The End of Torture", calling Obama's decision to restrict the CIA to the Army Field Manual "his most far-reaching and potentially controversial move" among these, and the subject of internal debate among Obama advisors. Others expressed doubt about the policies, citing that in six months an interagency commission, headed by the U.S. Attorney General, may recommend "additional or different guidance" for non-military agencies such as the CIA. The Center for Constitutional Rights, one group that represents detainees, termed the commission an "escape hatch" for returning to previous practices. The Wall Street Journal termed this the "Jack Bauer exception", saying that Obama was drawing a line where none really existed, citing that Bush officials have stated that they used water boarding only against three top al-Qaida officials in 2003, and saying that the real effect was that CIA interrogators were purchasing legal insurance.

== Interrogation methods ==
The manual permits nineteen interrogation techniques, Described in Chapter 8 of the manual as "approach techniques" to help establish a rapport, these are:

- Direct approach. Pertinent questions are asked directly "as long as the source is answering the questions in a truthful manner". In almost all HUMINT collection this is the first approach used, and an alternative approach is chosen once the source refuses to answer, avoids answering, or answers falsely.
- Incentive approach. A real or emotional reward is given, or a real or perceived negative stimulus is removed, within the limits of what can be delivered and what is permissible by national and international law.
- Emotional approaches join an emotional response with some attached incentive. These are:
  - Emotional love. "Sincerity and conviction are critical" for the questioner to be persuasive. "For example, if the source cooperates, he can see his family sooner, end the war, protect his comrades, help his country, help his ethnic group."
  - Emotional hate. The questioner persuades the source that cooperation will harm his enemies. The manual prohibits the questioner from promising that a unit will be denied a chance to surrender or that it will be mistreated.
  - Emotional fear-up. "The HUMINT collector must be extremely careful that he does not threaten or coerce a source," but can rely on justifiable fears such as that the prisoner may be killed for cooperating unless he receives protection, and can rely on non-specific fears, such as by asking "You know what can happen to you here?"
  - Emotional fear-down. A fearful subject is reassured "through verbal and physical actions" to calm him and cause him to view the interrogator as a "protector."
  - Emotional-pride and ego-up. The subject is "flattered into providing certain information in order to gain credit and build his ego" using a "somewhat-in-awe tone of voice." The subject might be complimented on a well-done operation or be persuaded to begin talking about an aspect of his job at which he is skilled.
  - Emotional-pride and ego-down. The questioner attacks the subject's "loyalty, intelligence, abilities, leadership qualities, slovenly appearance, or any other perceived weakness." If the subject tries to defend himself he may provide useful information. This must not "cross the line into humiliating and degrading treatment of the detainee," and the manual advises that the "experience level" and intended actions of subordinates be considered before an interrogation plan is approved using this method.
  - Emotional-futility. The questioner uses factual information to try to convince the source that resistance is futile. This approach generally must be combined with another, such as the emotional love approach, to be effective.
- Several other approaches are classed as requiring considerable time and resources, and as more suitable for detainees.
  - We know all. The interrogator "subtly convinces the source that his questioning of the source is perfunctory because any information that the source has is already known" by providing detailed information and answering himself when the source hesitates. The approach requires the interrogator to have a large amount of information already, and have committed much of it to memory.
  - File and dossier. The interrogator prepares himself with a large dossier (padded with paper if necessary) indexed with tabs for "education, employment, criminal record, military service, and others" and proceeds as in the "We know all" approach.
  - Establish your identity. The subject is told that he has been "identified as an infamous individual wanted by higher authorities on serious charges." In a sincere effort to correct this mistake, against the interrogator's persistent denials, he may provide leads for further development.
  - Repetition. The interrogator "listens carefully to a source's answer to a question, and then repeats the question and answer several times. He does this with each succeeding question until the source becomes so thoroughly bored with the procedure, he answers questions fully and candidly."
  - Rapid fire. One, two, or more interrogators "ask a series of questions in such a manner that the source does not have time to answer a question completely before the next one is asked. This confuses the source, and he will tend to contradict himself as he has little time to formulate his answers." The source may then be persuaded to explain the inconsistencies.
  - Silent. The interrogator "says nothing to the source, but looks him squarely in the eye, preferably with a slight smile on his face... [he forces the source to] break eye contact first. The source may become nervous, begin to shift in his chair, cross and re-cross his legs, and look away. He may ask questions..." After much delay, the interrogator asks questions such as "You planned this operation for a long time, didn't you?"
  - Change of scenery. When moved from the formal environment, "the source may experience a feeling of leaving the interrogation behind." The interrogator steers conversation toward the topic of interest, and "the source may never realize he is still being questioned."
- Two additional techniques require the approval of "the first O-6 in the interrogator's chain of command":
  - Mutt and Jeff. Two interrogators who are "convincing actors" are chosen. The first may "for instance, be very strict and order the source to follow all military courtesies during questioning. Although he conveys an unfeeling attitude, the HUMINT collector is careful not to threaten or coerce the source." The second scolds the first, may offer the source a beverage or a cigarette, and tries to persuade the source that they "share a high degree of intelligence and sensitivity." However, he is very busy and "cannot afford to waste time on an uncooperative source. He can broadly imply that the first HUMINT collector might return..."
  - False Flag. The goal is to "convince the detainee that individuals from a country other than the United States are interrogating him, and trick the detainee into cooperating with US forces." It may be "effectively orchestrated with the Fear Down approach and the Pride and Ego Up."
- The final technique, Separation, is detailed at much greater length than the others in Appendix M of the manual. It "may not be employed on detainees covered by Geneva Convention Relative to the Treatment of Prisoners of War, primarily enemy prisoners of war." It must be approved by the COCOM Commander for use in theater, and each specific instance must be approved by "the first General Officer/Flag Officer (GO/FO) in an interrogator's chain of command" following approval of the interrogation plan by the interrogation supervisor's servicing SJA [Staff Judge Advocate]. Extensions of the initial times given require approval of the servicing SJA. "The purpose of separation is to deny the detainee the opportunity to communicate with other detainees in order to keep him from learning counter-resistance techniques" The approach can be combined with Futility, Incentive, or Fear Up approaches. The separation "must not preclude the detainee getting four hours of continuous sleep every 24 hours." The two forms of separation are:
  - Physical separation, which prevents the detainee from communicating. Limited to 30 days of initial duration. Requires O-6 or above Approval.
  - Field expedient separation. "Prolong the shock of capture" by using "goggles or blindfolds and earmuffs" to prevent the detainee from communicating for up to 12 hours, plus the time these are used "for security purposes during transit and evacuation." "Use of hoods (sacks) over the head, or of duct tape or adhesive tape over the eyes" is prohibited. The manual states that the technique shall not amount to sensory deprivation, a known harmful practice. Khalid Shaikh Mohammed described disorientation through the use of goggles and earmuffs in 2007.
