= 20th hijacker =

Possible additional terrorist in the September 11 attacks of 2001

The 20th hijacker is a putative person who intended to act alongside the eventual 19 hijackers in the September 11 attacks (9/11), but did not do so. Several individuals have been identified by investigators, journalists, or themselves as the 20th hijacker. There were many variations of the 9/11 plot, with the number of hijackers fluctuating with changing circumstances and resources available to Al-Qaeda. In the event, three of the four hijacked planes were taken over by five Al-Qaeda members each, while four members hijacked United Airlines Flight 93. Due to the passengers onboard resisting the hijackers, Flight 93 crashed into a field near Shanksville, Pennsylvania before it could reach its target in Washington, D.C.

== Suspects ==
Various people associated with Al-Qaeda have either claimed or have been speculated as the possible 20th hijacker in the September 11 attacks.

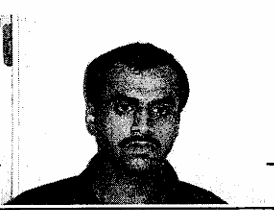
Mohammed al-Qahtani during his INS detention on August 4, 2001.

=== Mohammed al-Qahtani ===
Investigators have accused Mohammed al-Qahtani, a Saudi national, of being the intended 20th hijacker, and intending to board Flight 93 as its fifth hijacker (and fourth muscle hijacker) on September 11. These allegations stem from circumstances surrounding al-Qahtani's failed attempt to enter the United States shortly before the September 11 attacks.

Having originally flown out of Dubai on August 3, 2001, al-Qahtani had disembarked a Virgin Atlantic flight from London Gatwick Airport and arrived at Orlando International Airport the following day. With a one-way ticket and $2,800 in cash, al-Qahtani was questioned by immigration agent José Meléndez-Pérez on suspicion of being an illegal immigrant. Al-Qahtani had been stopped by another immigration agent before Meléndez-Pérez, but al-Qahtani could not communicate with the agent nor did he properly fill out necessary travel documents. Meléndez-Pérez described that upon being questioned via an interpreter employed by the Department of Justice, al-Qahtani was belligerent and frequently changed his reasons for arriving to Orlando. Additionally, Meléndez-Pérez said that al-Qahtani had refused to answer any questions under oath. After the 90-minute interview, al-Qahtani was formally denied entry into the US under expedited removal and sent back to London on a connecting flight to Dubai at his own expense. Before being deported, al-Qahtani was photographed and fingerprinted through INSPASS. Though al-Qahtani's Saudi passport was determined to be genuine by immigration inspectors, later investigations found that it featured a fraudulent stamp associated with Al-Qaeda. Al-Qahtani's luggage was not checked by inspectors. Meléndez-Pérez later testified that al-Qahtani had turned to him and another inspector and said "I'll be back." in English before boarding his return flight.

After the September 11 attacks, the Federal Bureau of Investigation (FBI) re-examined circumstances of al-Qahtani's attempted entry. The FBI had reportedly discovered that a phone call had been placed from the Orlando International Airport to a known phone number associated with Al-Qaeda on the day of the incident. In addition, the FBI had obtained surveillance footage of the airport's parking lots and found a rental car that they identified as belonging to Mohamed Atta, the ringleader of the attacks. A 2008 Department of Defense detainee assessment stated that Atta was al-Qahtani's intended contact in the United States. According to the FBI, Atta did not leave the airport's parking lot until it was confirmed al-Qahtani was returning to Dubai.

==== Capture ====
On December 15, 2001, amid the Battle of Tora Bora, al-Qahtani was captured in Afghanistan by Pakistani Army and Frontier Corps forces. Al-Qahtani was with a group of Arabs led by Ali al-Bahlul fleeing to the Pakistan border. After being transferred to US custody, al-Qahtani was transferred to Joint Task Force Guantanamo on February 13, 2002 with an Interment Serial Number of 063. Al-Qahtani told US interrogators that he had been in Afghanistan to pursue his interest in falconry. According to author Jane Mayer, investigators could not pinpoint al-Qahtani's identity until July 2002, when a routine fingerprint analysis matched with al-Qahtani's fingerprints taken in Orlando.

On March 3, 2006, Time magazine published a leaked log detailing 49 days of al-Qahtani's interrogations at Guantanamo Bay detention camp from November 23, 2002 to January 11, 2003. The log described al-Qahtani being forcibly administered intravenous fluids, drugs, and enemas, in order to keep his body functioning well enough for the interrogations to continue. The Convening Authority of the Guantanamo Military Commissions Susan J. Crawford asserted that al-Qahtani's interrogations amounted to torture. Crawford's statement was the first time any official of the Bush administration had publicly described the treatment of detainees at Guantanamo as torture.

On March 6, 2022, al-Qahtani was airlifted from Guantanamo by the US military and flown back to Saudi Arabia to a mental health treatment facility after 20 years in American custody. His release was announced by the US Department of Defense the next day.

==== 9/11 Commission's findings ====
In the 9/11 Commission's final report, al-Qahtani is first introduced as "The operative likely intended to round out the team for [United 93]". The 9/11 Commission reported that in a purported conversation between Mohamed Atta and Ramzi bin al-Shibh, the two referred to al-Qahtani as "the friend who is coming as a tourist" whom Mustafa al-Hawsawi was sending as “the last one” to “complete the group.” Meléndez-Pérez believed that al-Qahtani had posed as a typical Saudi tourist seeking to visit Walt Disney World.

The 9/11 Commission cited Meléndez-Pérez's testimony in its assessment of a possible 20th hijacker. After Meléndez-Pérez's testimony, Commission member Richard Ben-Veniste stated “It is entirely plausible to suggest your actions in doing your job efficiently and competently may well have contributed to saving the Capitol or the White House and all the people who were in those buildings, those monuments to democracy”.

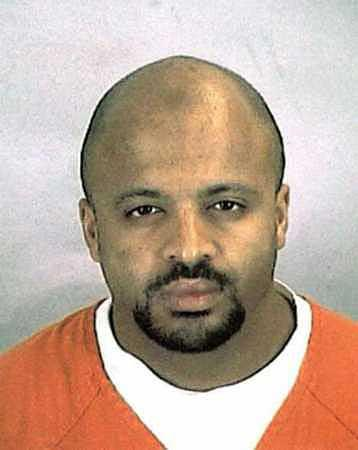
Mugshot of Moussaoui, 2006

=== Zacarias Moussaoui ===
Zacarias Moussaoui, a French citizen of Moroccan origin, has widely been referred to as the 20th hijacker. French intelligence began tracking Moussaoui in 1996, after he was spotted with Islamic extremists in London. Intelligence officials stated that Moussaoui had flown to Afghanistan multiple times to attend terrorist training camps and meet with Al-Qaeda officials in Kandahar and Jalalabad. Moussaoui may have been considered as a replacement for Ziad Jarrah, who at one point threatened to withdraw from the scheme because of tensions amongst the plotters. The 9/11 Commission stated that Moussaoui received money and information from the principal architect of the attacks, Khalid Sheikh Mohammed (KSM), throughout its planning stages. Ultimately, Moussaoui did not play a role in the final hijacking scheme.

Moussaoui's supposed role and overall importance in the attacks has been the subject of debate and repeated contradictions. Intelligence officials and KSM both stated that Moussaoui was not intended to participate in the September 11 attacks, but rather a planned second wave of attacks. An audio recording attributed to Osama bin Laden said in translation that Moussaoui "had no connection at all with 11 September... I am the one in charge of the 19 brothers and I never assigned brother Zacarias to be with them in that mission ... Since Zacarias Moussaoui was still learning to fly, he wasn't number 20 in the group, as your government claimed". The voice alleged to be bin Laden also suggested that Moussaoui's confession was "void" as it was a result of pressures applied during his incarceration. Conversely, the 9/11 Commission remarked that had the FBI known about Moussaoui's connection with Al-Qaeda earlier, the US might conceivably have disrupted or derailed the 9/11 attacks altogether. Moussaoui himself claimed that he was slated to hijack a separate plane during the attacks.

==== Training and capture ====
From February 26 to May 29, 2001, Moussaoui attended flight training courses at Airman Flight School in Norman, Oklahoma, where he was described as a "below average" student. Moussaoui completed 57 hours of flying lessons and left without ever having flown solo. In August 2001, Moussaoui began taking flying lessons at Pan-Am International Flight Academy in Eagan, Minnesota. Moussaoui had been wired thousands of dollars to fund his training, and he paid the bulk of his tuition in US$100 bills. According to his classmates and instructor in Eagan, Moussaoui was immediately viewed with suspicion due to his aggression and unusual interest in flying wide-body aircraft such as a Boeing 747-400 despite his lack of experience. School supervisors contacted the FBI, and Moussaoui was arrested and charged with an immigration violation on August 16.

==== Trial ====
During the trial, Moussaoui testified that he and "shoe bomber" Richard Reid were supposed to hijack a fifth plane on September 11 and crash it into the White House. No direct connection between Moussaoui and Reid had ever before been alleged, and this testimony contradicted earlier testimony by Moussaoui that he had been intended for an operation after September 11. Moussaoui pleaded guilty in 2005 to collaborating with the other hijackers, and was sentenced to life in prison without the possibility of parole in May 2006, making him the only person to be convicted in an American civilian court of a crime in connection with 9/11. Writing in the Los Angeles Times, Richard A. Serrano reported that Moussaoui's apparent preference to die as an identified 9/11 plotter cast doubt on his self-admitted connection to the attacks. Moussaoui is currently held at the ADX Florence federal supermax prison in Colorado.

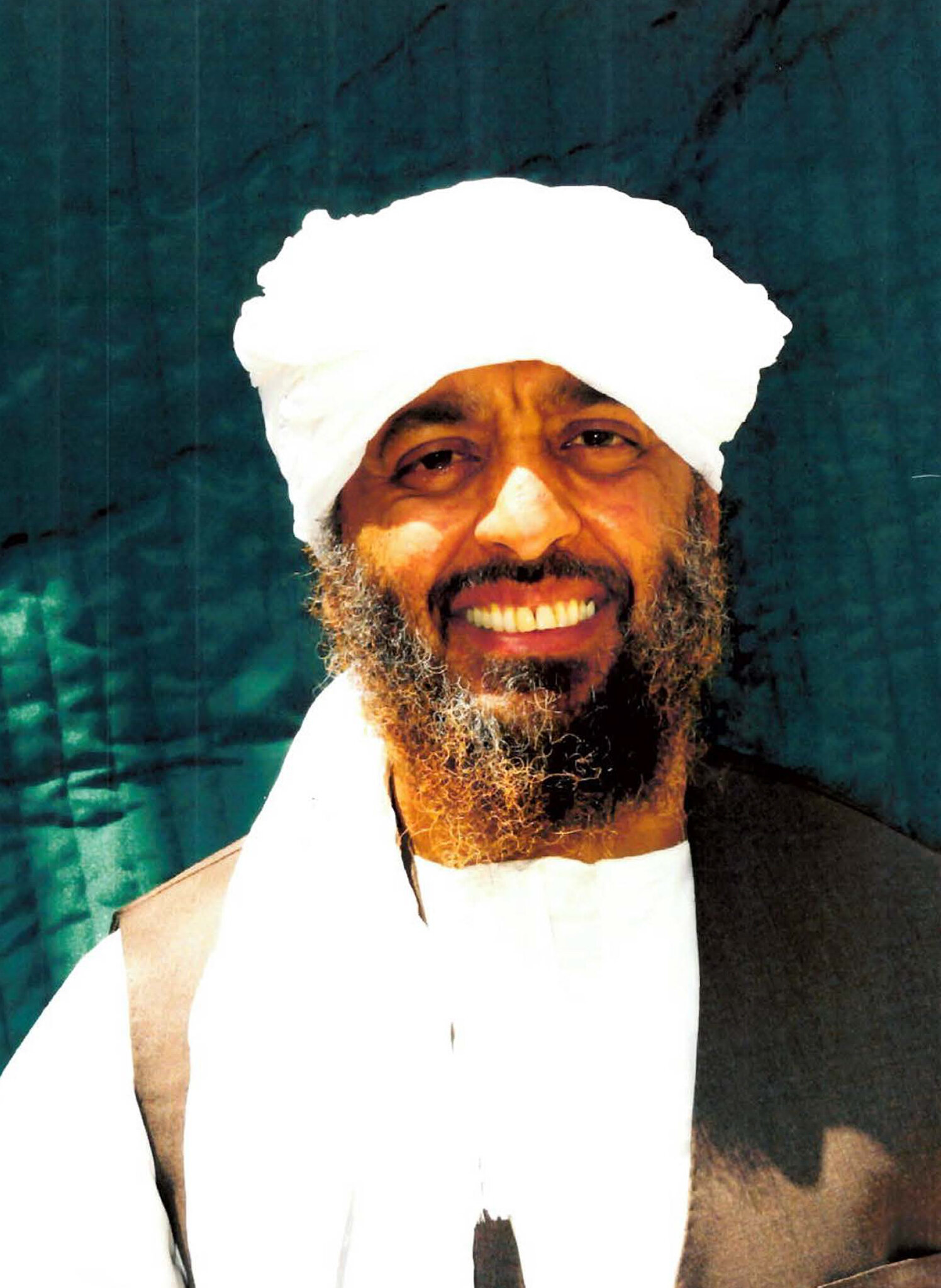
Bin al-Shibh, circa 2023

=== Ramzi bin al-Shibh ===
Ramzi bin al-Shibh was one of the first people to be labeled as the "20th hijacker" by US authorities. According to the 9/11 Commission, Bin al-Shibh intended to take part in the attacks and may have been an intended hijacker-pilot of American Airlines Flight 77; he was repeatedly denied a US visa. His role as one of the four hijacker-pilots preceded Hani Hanjour, as original plans for the 9/11 attacks called for bin al-Shibh to be one of the hijacker pilots along with Mohamed Atta, Marwan al-Shehhi, and Ziad Jarrah. Unlike Hanjour, bin al-Shibh was a member of the Hamburg cell alongside the three other hijacker pilots. After failing to gain a visa to enter the United States, bin al-Shibh served as an intermediary between Atta in the United States and KSM in Afghanistan. The 9/11 Commission noted that Bin al-Shibh had arranged to wire funding for the plot, including Moussaoui's tuition money. Outside of his role in the September 11 attacks, bin al-Shibh is suspected of having been involved in the 2000 USS Cole bombing, and the 2002 Ghriba synagogue bombing in Tunisia.

==== Capture and trial ====
Bin al-Shibh has been in United States custody since he was captured in Karachi, Pakistan in 2002. He was held by the Central Intelligence Agency (CIA) before being transferred to Guantanamo Bay in 2006. While in custody, Bin al-Shibh underwent enhanced interrogation techniques. Finally charged in 2008 before a military commission, he and four other accused planners of 9/11: KSM, Ammar al-Baluchi, Mustafa al-Hawsawi, and Walid bin Attash were jointly prosecuted and went to trial beginning in May 2012. In 2023, a US military judge ruled him too psychologically damaged to defend himself after the torture he sustained while in the custody of the CIA and Guantanamo Bay. In January 2026, a military judge rejected a government request to restart death-penalty proceedings against bin al-Shibh.

=== Fawaz al-Nashimi ===
According to the BBC, Fawaz al-Nashimi, also known as Turki bin Fuheid al-Muteiry, claimed to have been the "20th hijacker". In 2006, US intelligence released an Al-Qaeda video showing al-Nashimi justifying attacks on the west. The US dismissed al-Nashimi's claims as propaganda. Al-Nashimi took part in a May 29, 2004 attack on oil facilities in Khobar, Saudi Arabia. He was killed in a June 2004 shootout with Saudi Arabian security forces.

=== Other individuals ===
According to the 9/11 Commission, other individuals who allegedly attempted, but were not able, to take part in the attacks were Walid bin Attash, Zakariya Essabar, Abu Bara al Yemeni, Ali Abdul Aziz Ali, Mushabib al-Hamlan, Abderraouf Jdey, Khalid Saeed Ahmad al-Zahrani, Ali Abd al-Rahman al-Faqasi al-Ghamdi, Saeed al-Baluchi, Qutaybah al-Najdi, Zuhair al-Thubaiti, and Saud al-Rashi.According to Moussaoui, shoe bomber Richard Reid was to assist him in hijacking a fifth plane that was to be crashed into the White House. However, the Department of Justice is skeptical that Reid was to participate in the attacks.

In addition, Khalid Sheikh Mohammed, the attack's mastermind, had wanted to remove Khalid al-Mihdhar from the operation, but he was overruled by Osama bin Laden.

== In popular culture ==
The Saudi Arabian novelist Abdullah Thabit wrote a 2006 novel titled Terrorist Number 20 that became a bestseller. The book recalls his teenage years as a religious extremist and was inspired in part by Ahmed al-Nami, one of the 9/11 hijackers and a fellow resident of Abha who was vaguely familiar to Thabit. In April 2006, three months after the release of the book, Thabit was forced to move from Abha to Jeddah with his family after receiving death threats.

== See also ==
- USS Cole bombing mastermind – Multiple individuals were alleged to be the mastermind of the USS Cole bombing.
