= Gitanjali Gutierrez =

American lawyer

- Born: Gitanjali S. Gutierrez
- Occupation: Lawyer

Gitanjali S. Gutierrez is an American lawyer. She is the lawyer for the defendant Mohammed al-Qahtani, who was held at Camp Delta in Guantanamo Bay by the United States Military. Gutierrez is an attorney with the Center for Constitutional Rights, a New York–based nonprofit organization.

The Toronto Star quoted Gutierrez, in a February 4, 2007, article, states that Gutierrez was the first lawyer to visit a Guantanamo captive. The article quotes Gutierrez about the emotional state of her clients, since her first visits to the camp:

- "They were just shell-shocked. They were getting news for the first time from outside."
- "It has been a downhill battle since ... and they now just struggle to maintain hope."
- "This place isn't just illegal, it's immoral, and I don't think the U.S. can afford to keep it open."

Gutierrez is one of the plaintiffs in CCR v. Bush, filed on July 9, 2007. Four other individuals filed this suit. In addition to President Bush, the other defendants were, Keith B. Alexander Director of the National Security Agency; Michael D. Maples, Director of the Defense Intelligence Agency; Porter J. Goss, Director of the Central Intelligence Agency; Michael Chertoff, Secretary of the Department of Homeland Security; Robert S. Mueller III, Director of the Federal Bureau of Investigation; and John D. Negroponte, Director of National Intelligence. Gutierrez and her colleagues were suing the US government to object to its interception of their mail, email and phone calls.

On October 15, 2007, Gutierrez wrote about her upcoming first meeting with Majid Khan. Khan, a Pakistani who was a legal resident of the US, who completed his high school and University education in Maryland, is the first of the "high value detainees" to meet with a lawyer. Majid Khan, and thirteen other captives, including Khalid Sheikh Mohammed and Abu Zubaydah, were transferred from CIA custody, to military custody in Guantanamo, on September 6, 2006. The high value detainees had been clandestinely held in the CIA's black sites.

She has been awarded the Fourth IRDS Awards for Law for fighting for the rights of these prisoners, awarded by the Lucknow-based Institute for Research and Documentation in Social Sciences (IRDS).

Gitanjali Gutierrez was a featured speaker at TEDxBermuda 2011, presenting: "Finding Humanity in the Tortured Darkness of Guantanamo"

== Bermuda appointment ==
Governor of Bermuda George Fergusson announced on February 27, 2015, that he has appointed Ms Gitanjali Gutierrez to be Bermuda's Information Commissioner, designated under section 50 of the Public Access to Information Act 2010 [PATI]. "Ms Gutierrez will take up her duties with effect from March 2, 2015, ahead of the Act coming into force on April 1, 2015," a spokesperson said.

Mr Fergusson said: "Ms Gita Gutierrez has a distinguished record as a lawyer dealing with issues of public access to information in the US and, to some extent, the UK. "She has impressive experience of leading a team in complex areas of legal interpretation and public scrutiny. I am very pleased that she will be taking on this important and difficult role." Ms Gutiérrez, who is married to a Bermudian and has lived on the Island since 2011, is a graduate of Bucknell University and Cornell Law School, where she has also served as an adjunct professor of law. Her legal career has focused particularly on civil rights issues.

The PATI legislation allows the public to request information from publicly funded bodies. The information commissioner, who will initially be appointed for five years, is to start by assessing Bermuda's readiness for PATI. She will also deal with appeals over requests that are turned down.
