= Joan Higginbotham =

American astronaut and engineer (born 1964)

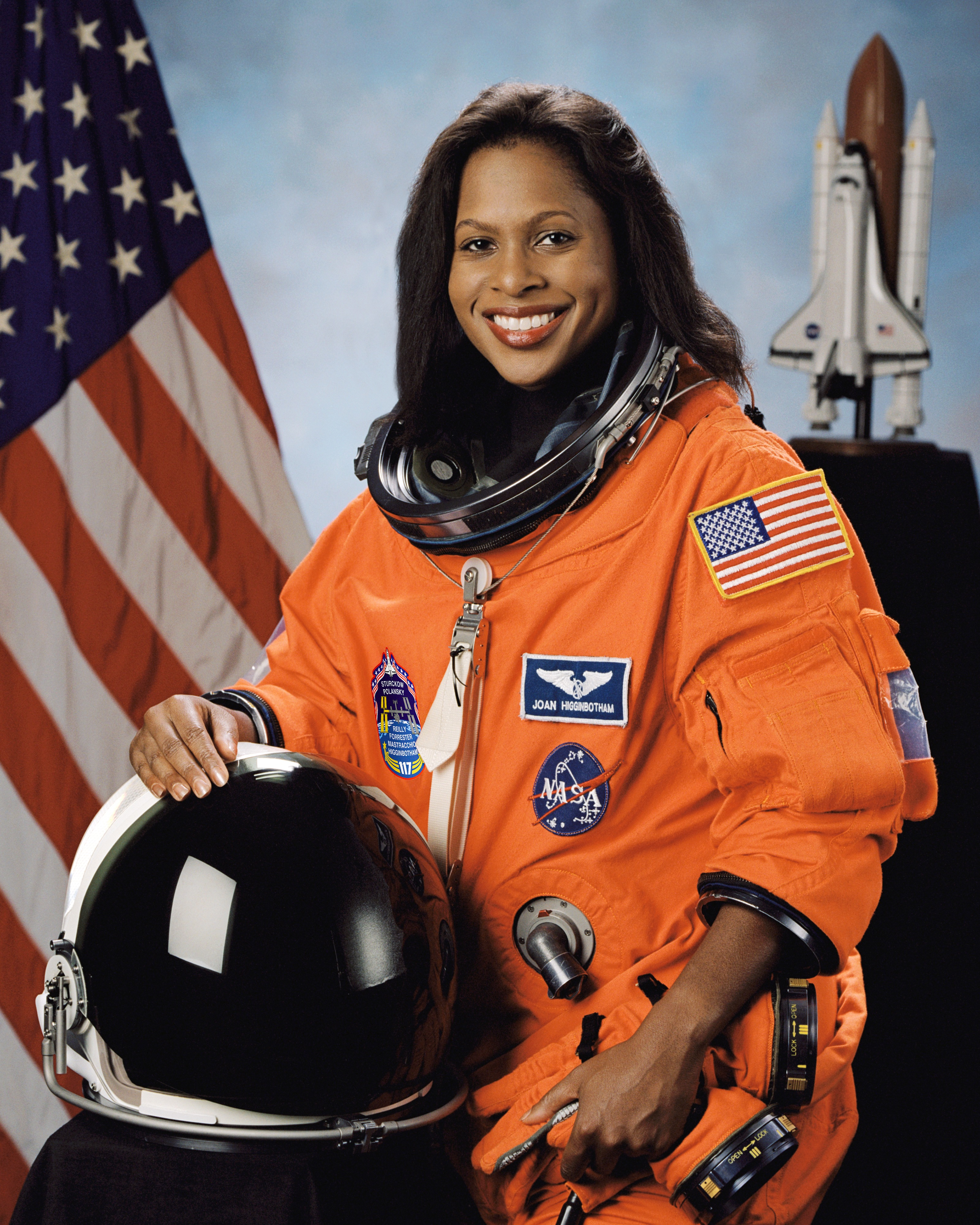
- Born: August 3, 1964 (age 62); Chicago, Illinois, U.S.
- Education: Southern Illinois University, Carbondale (BS); Florida Institute of Technology (MS, MS)
- Space career

NASA astronaut
- Time in space: 12d 20h 45m
- Selection: NASA Group 16 (1996)
- Missions: STS-116 (2006)

Joan Elizabeth Higginbotham (born August 3, 1964) is an electrical engineer and a former NASA astronaut. She flew aboard Space Shuttle Discovery mission STS-116 as a mission specialist and is the third African American woman to go into space, after Mae Jemison and Stephanie Wilson.

== Early life and education ==
Higginbotham was born in Chicago, Illinois, and attended Whitney Young Magnet High School, graduating in 1982. She received a Bachelor of Science degree from the Southern Illinois University Carbondale in 1987, and a master's in management science (1992) and in space systems (1996) both from the Florida Institute of Technology.

Higginbotham is a member of Delta Sigma Theta Sorority and The Links, Incorporated.

== Career ==
=== NASA ===
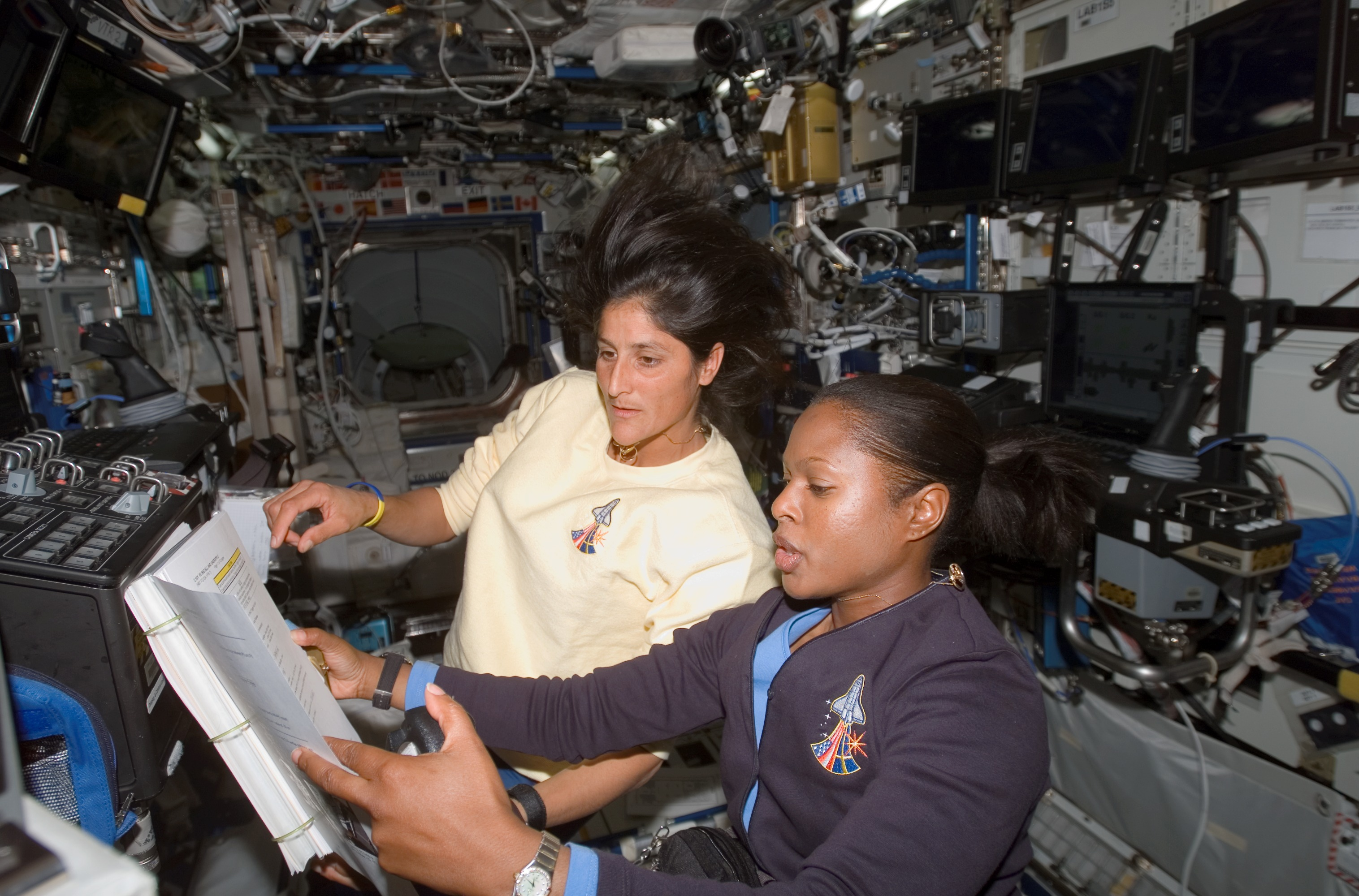
Joan E. Higginbotham (foreground) and Sunita L. Williams (Expedition 14 flight engineer) refer to a procedures checklist as they work the controls of the Canadarm2 in the International Space Station's Destiny laboratory during flight day four of STS-116.

Higginbotham began her career in 1987, two weeks after getting her Bachelor of Science degree, at the Kennedy Space Center (KSC), Florida, as a Payload Electrical Engineer in the Electrical and Telecommunications Systems Division. Within six months she became the lead for the Orbiter Experiments (OEX) on OV-102, the Space Shuttle Columbia. She later worked on the Shuttle payload bay reconfiguration for all Shuttle missions and conducted electrical compatibility tests for all payloads flown aboard the Shuttle. She was also tasked by KSC management to undertake several special assignments where she served as the Executive Staff Assistant to the Director of Shuttle Operations and Management, led a team of engineers in performing critical analysis for the Space Shuttle flow in support of a simulation model tool, and worked on an interactive display detailing the Space Shuttle processing procedures at Spaceport United States (Kennedy Space Center's Visitors Center). Higginbotham then served as backup orbiter project engineer for OV-104, Space Shuttle Atlantis, where she participated in the integration of the orbiter docking station (ODS) into the space shuttle used during Shuttle/Mir docking missions. Two years later, she was promoted to lead orbiter project engineer for OV-102, Space Shuttle Columbia. In this position, she held the technical lead government engineering position in the firing room where she supported and managed the integration of vehicle testing and troubleshooting. She actively participated in 53 space shuttle launches during her 9-year tenure at Kennedy Space Center.

Selected as an astronaut candidate by NASA in April 1996, Higginbotham reported to the Johnson Space Center in August 1996. Since that time, she had been assigned technical duties in the Payloads & Habitability Branch, the Shuttle Avionics & Integration Laboratory (SAIL), the Kennedy Space Center (KSC) Operations (Ops) Support Branch, where she tested various modules of the International Space Station for operability, compatibility, and functionality prior to launch, the Astronaut Office CAPCOM (Capsule Communicator) Branch in the startup and support of numerous space station missions and space shuttle missions, the Robotics Branch, and Lead for the International Space Station Systems Crew Interfaces Section.

Higginbotham logged over 308 hours in space during her mission with the crew of STS-116 where her primary task was to operate the Space Station Remote Manipulator System (SSRMS). Higginbotham took a scarf for the Houston Dynamo on board with her during her mission.

Higginbotham was originally assigned to the crew of STS-126 targeted for launch in September 2008. On November 21, 2007, NASA announced a change in the crew manifest, due to Higginbotham's decision to leave NASA to take a job in the private sector. Donald Pettit replaced Higginbotham for STS-126.

== Awards and honors ==
- Group Award for achievements related to the flight of the STS-26 (the first shuttle flight after the Challenger disaster)
- NASA Exceptional Service Medal
- Keys to the Cities of Cocoa and Rockledge, Florida
- Certificate of Appreciation for Service, Kennedy Space Center Public Affairs
- Women of Color in Technology Career Achievement Award
- Commendation of Merit for Service to the Department of Defense Missions
- World Who's Who of Women
- 1992, 1993, 1995 50 Distinguished Scientists and Engineers, National Technical Association
- 1997 Distinguished Alumni, Florida Institute of Technology
- 2004 Top 50 Women, Essence Magazine
- 2007 Technical Achiever (Engineer), National Technical Association
- 2007 Women in Space Science Award, Adler Planetarium
- 2007 Black Rose Award, League of Black Women
- 2008 Featured in "Bold Visions: Women in Science & Technology", a PBS special
- 2014 50 Most Influential Women, The Mecklenburg Times
- 2016 Honorary Doctor of Aerospace Science, Southern Illinois University at Carbondale
- 2017 Honorary Doctor of Humane Letters, University of New Orleans
- 2019 Featured speaker, TEDxBermuda

== See also ==
- List of African-American astronauts
