= TEDxBermuda =

- Status: Active
- Genre: General conference
- Country: Bermuda
- Inaugurated: April 2011
- Organizer: John Narraway, Sophie Mathew, Niklas Traub
- Filing status: Non-profit
- Website: http://www.tedxbermuda.com

TEDxBermuda is an independently organized, licensed TED conference, held each year in Bermuda since 2011.

== Main Events ==
| Date | Venue |
|---|---|
| 23 April 2011 | Bermuda Underwater Exploration Institute |
| 15 October 2011 | The Fairmont Southampton |
| 13 October 2012 | The Fairmont Southampton |
| 19 October 2013 | The Fairmont Southampton |
| 4 October 2014 | The Fairmont Southampton |
| 10 October 2015 | The Fairmont Southampton |
| 25 March 2017 | The Fairmont Southampton |
| 6 October 2018 | The Fairmont Southampton |
| 5 October 2019 | The Fairmont Southampton |

== Featured Speakers ==
April 2011

- Jonathan Vaughters - CEO of Slipstream Sports / Manager of UCI WorldTeam Cannondale-Garmin https://www.slipstreamsports.com/
- Keith Caisey - Percussionist / Ethnomusicologist
- Dr. Michael Lomas - Senior Research Scientist at the Bermuda Institute of Ocean Sciences
- Captain Paul Watson - Founder of Sea Shepherd Conservation Society
- OB Sisay - Head of Africa Research at FM Capital Partners
- Gitanjali S. Gutierrez - Attorney - Center for Constitutional Rights
- Tiffany Paynter - Spoken Word Artist
- Alan Gilbertson - Managing Director of FoodBank South Africa
- Daniel Lieberman, PHD - Professor of Human Evolutionary Biology, Harvard University
- Dr. Neil Burnie - Director of The Bermuda Shark Project
- Graham Foster - Sculptor / Painter

October 2011

- Lawrence Sass - Associate Professor at MIT's Department of Architecture
- Mike Ramsdell - Documentary Filmmaker
- Pen Hadow - Polar Explorer
- Joy T. Barnum - Bermudian Vocalist / Songwriter
- Larry Mills - Bermudian Builder
- Ryan Legassicke - Contemporary Canadian Artist
- Tony Ruto - CTO of Within Technologies Ltd
- Dickson Despommier - The Vertical Farming Project
- Jeffrey Masters - Co-founder of the Weather Underground

October 2012

- Jessica Lewis - Bermudian Paralympian, on making it to London 2012
- John Sculley - former CEO of Pepsi-Cola and Apple Inc. on "Medicine and the Cloud"
- Ross Stein - a geophysicist and expert on earthquake science, who discussed how to better forecast and manage the threat of earthquakes
- Sossina M. Haile - a professor of Materials Science and Chemical Engineering at Caltech who is working towards a carbon-neutral world by turning CO_{2} into fuel
- Norman Seeff - a filmmaker and photographer who has dedicated much of his life to better understanding the creative process
- Hanli Prinsloo - freediving record holder and conservationist, on human connection to the sea: "I am Water"
- Peter Bentley - on "Embracing Chaos"—why science must learn from the randomness of nature
- Eric Barnhill - Juilliard trained pianist doing a PhD in Medical Physics on "Therapy Through Music"
- Felix Tod - producer on "Saving the Music Business, a Performance"
- K Gabrielle - Bermudian singer
- Alan Burland - Chairman of Bermuda Sloop Foundation, on "Education: Back to the Future"
- KASE - Bermudian rapper

October 2013

- Jinichi Kawakami - Japan's Last Ninja
- Arlene Brock - Bermuda’s Ombudsman
- Robert Lustig - Beating the Odds Against Sugar
- Natalie Kuldell - Synthesizing Change: Garage Genomics
- Andrew Park - TED Animation Guru
- Chip Yates - World's Fastest ePilot
- Bren Smith - 3D Ocean Farming
- Rafael Grossmann - Google Glass Surgery
- Hip Hop Fundamentals - Teaching Physics Using Breakdance
- Jeremy Gilley - Peace One Day founder

October 2014

- Ishrat Yakub - Motion Activated
- Oliver Steeds - The Future of Exploration
- Jason Healey - Saving Cyberspace
- Adjoa Andoh - What Determines Who You Are
- Uzimon/Daniel Frith - From Novelty to Enterprise
- Charles Hoskinson - The Future Will be Decentralised
- Lauren Bowker - Intelligent Textiles
- Weldon Wade - Diving With a Purpose
- Elizabeth Stokoe - The Conversational Racetrack
- Stephan Johnstone - Progression
- Carl Lipo - Easter Island: Lessons from One Small Island to Another

October 2015

- InMotion - Interconnected
- Martijn Berger - It's a Happy World After All
- Tom Gage - The Powerplant in Your Driveway
- Martha Dismont - I Have the Best Job in the World
- Michael Frith - Drawing Inspiration From One's Environment
- Radhika Nagpal - Taming the Swarm
- Clilly Castiglia - The Roar of the Crowd
- No Strings - When Puppets Speak, Children Listen
- Yesha Townsend - Home
- Barrington Irving - Creating the Next Generation of Explorers
- Stuart Lacey - The Future of Your Personal Data - Privacy vs Monetization
- Bryan Davis - The New Spirit of Innovation

October 2019

- Joan Higginbotham
- Richard Browning
- Domhnaill Hernon
- Harry Yeff a.k.a. Reeps One
- Jonna Hiestand Mendez
- Dr. Thomas Boothby, Ph.D.
- Dr. Kelly Lambert
- Alexander Rose
- Ed Christopher
- Oliver Rajamani
