= José Meléndez-Pérez =

American law enforcement official

José E. Meléndez-Pérez (born January 2, 1946) is a Puerto Rican-born United States Immigration and Naturalization Service Inspector at Orlando International Airport who became a key figure for the 9/11 Commission when he refused entry to an alleged terrorist prior to the September 11, 2001 attacks.

== Personal life ==
José Meléndez-Pérez is one of three sons born to chauffeur, Nicolas Meléndez (1912–1998) and factory worker, Francisca Pérez (born 1924). He has six half-siblings (three half-brothers and three half-sisters) from his father's other relationships. His parents divorced in 1975 after 30 years of marriage. He married twice and has five children, Freddy, Maribel, Brenda, Jose Jr. and Nelson. One of Meléndez-Pérez sons, José Jr. is a Directorate Sergeant Major in the U.S. Army Rangers since August 1996 and served in the War in Afghanistan and Iraq War with the 319th Field Artillery Regiment of the 82nd Airborne Division. His other son, Nelson, is a police officer with the Puerto Rico Police. One of his daughters, Brenda, is married to an U.S. Immigration and Customs Enforcement officer serving in the U.S. Embassy in Frankfurt, Germany.

== Career ==
Meléndez-Pérez's story is told in the book Instinct by Michael Smerconish (Lyons Press, September 2009), as well as Glenn Beck's Miracles and Massacres (Threshold Editions/Mercury Radio Arts, 2013). Prior to the formation of the Department of Homeland Security, he was employed by the U.S. Immigration and Naturalization Service (INS) from November 15, 1992, to April 30, 2003.

He joined the United States Army, where he served honorably for over 26.5 years (1965-1992). He served two tours of duty in the Vietnam War, 1965–1966 and 1969–1970. He was later assigned as a first sergeant to the United States Army Recruiting Command.

After retiring from the U.S. Army, he transitioned to a career in federal immigration enforcement in the U.S. Immigration and Naturalization Service (INS). His initial International Airport assignments were in Florida, including duties at Fort Lauderdale International Airport. Began in November 1992 at Miami International Airport as an inspector, and later as an inspector at Orlando International Airport. He was assigned for six months at the Federal Law Enforcement Training Center in Glynco, Georgia, providing assistance to the firearms program. Following the September 11, 2001, terrorist attacks and the subsequent reorganization of federal immigration enforcement agencies under the Department of Homeland Security, José Meléndez-Pérez transitioned from his role as a supervisory United States Customs and Border Protection (CBP) officer at Orlando International Airport to serving as a CBP liaison to the Orlando Joint Terrorism Task Force (JTTF).

=== Actions on August 4, 2001 ===
A Saudi Arabian national, Mohammed al Qahtani, landed in Orlando on a Virgin Atlantic flight. Since Qahtani's forms were not properly filled out, he was moved to a secondary interview, conducted by Meléndez-Pérez. Qahtani did not have a return ticket or a hotel. He had $2,800 in cash and no credit cards. His responses to questions regarding where he would stay and where he would go were evasive. Besides being quite hostile, Qahtani also made contradictory statements regarding his plans.

Meléndez-Pérez advised his superiors to have him sent back. According to Meléndez-Pérez's testimony, as he sent Qahtani back out of the United States, the man allegedly turned around to him and said "something to the effect of 'I'll be back.'"

Because of Meléndez-Pérez's actions, United Airlines Flight 93 only had three "muscle" hijackers to backup pilot hijacker Ziad Jarrah, instead of four like with Mohamed Atta, Marwan al-Shehhi, and Hani Hanjour on the other three hijacked aircraft in American Airlines Flight 11, United Airlines Flight 175, and American Airlines Flight 77. This small difference likely helped in allowing the passengers on United 93 to revolt against Jarrah and his team and force them to crash land the aircraft in Shanksville, Pennsylvania before they could reach their target in the United States Capitol building. When called before the 9/11 Commission, Meléndez-Pérez was praised for how his actions, unknown to him at the time, potentially saved hundreds of lives, along with the Capitol Building, and was thanked for it. As for al Qahtani, he was later apprehended in Afghanistan and provided intel that led to the death of al-Qaeda leader Osama bin Laden in 2011 at the hands of U.S. military forces.

== See also ==
- Samuel J. Heyman Service to America Medals (2004 Finalist)
