= Pal Mickey =

Walt Disney World toy

Pal Mickey is a discontinued interactive stuffed toy developed by The Walt Disney Company and previously sold at Walt Disney World. Pal Mickey was discontinued and no new stock is available for purchase as of October 2008.

The toy is a ten-inch (25 cm) plush model of Mickey Mouse, soft and easy for children to hold. Inside, it contains a microprocessor, a speaker, three AA batteries, three squeeze sensors (one in each hand and one in its belly), and an infrared receiver in its nose. A loop on the back of its head fits a clip or a lanyard hook for ease of carrying.

Pal Mickey was sold for use at the four theme parks at Walt Disney World Resort: the Magic Kingdom, Epcot, Disney's Hollywood Studios, and Disney's Animal Kingdom. Guests could previously purchase Pal Mickey at various on site hotel gift shops, all four theme parks, and Downtown Disney. It communicates invisibly with more than four hundred infrared transmitters around these parks. It will periodically giggle and vibrate to indicate that it has information to provide; when its belly or hand is squeezed, it will speak up with information about the immediate area, parade and showtime reminders, tips on what costumed walkaround characters may be nearby, and attractions with short queue times. It "remembers" where it has been so as to avoid repeating itself.

If it is squeezed when it has no tips to provide or when it is not at a park, it will tell jokes and play simple games. The toy is programmed with over seven hundred pre-recorded phrases. In September 2014, Disney began to gradually "sunset" Pal Mickey's functionality at the parks. As of May 2024, Pal Mickey continued to react to its immediate area in some locations (such as Tomorrowland and Liberty Square), but no longer provides updates on character meet and greets or parade and showtime reminders.

== Versions ==
The original version of Pal Mickey (commonly referred to as "1.0") was introduced in May 2003. It was dressed in red shorts with white buttons, white gloves, and yellow shoes. It sold for US$50, with rentals available for $8 per day plus a $50 deposit to return it by noon the following day; if not returned, that deposit was forfeited and the toy was considered sold. This version of the toy came with a clip. The rental program was discontinued at the end of 2004.

The "Happiest Celebration On Earth" version of the toy (commonly referred to as "2.0") was introduced on May 5, 2005, with the start of the Happiest Celebration on Earth events. It is priced at US$65. It is dressed in red shorts with gold buttons, white gloves, and yellow shoes; it wears a tailcoat and a gold bowtie, both of which fasten with velcro. It comes with a clip and a lanyard for carrying it. This version improves on the original in many small ways, such as by having a louder speaker, and it is able to sing Disney songs and ask Disney character trivia questions. Permanently attached to its right hand is a golden medallion; squeezing its right hand will make Mickey giggle and will make a "Happiest Celebration on Earth Glow Medallion" (sold during 2005) light up.

In September 2006, the "Pal Mickey Sorcerer Costume" (commonly referred to as "3.0") replaced the previous version of the toy. This Pal Mickey is dressed in a (removable) blue Sorcerer Mickey hat, red robe, and blue shorts (sewn on over Mickey's red shorts, which have white buttons like the first release). It does not have the medallion on its hand.

A Spanish version of Pal Mickey was also available.

Four costumes for the toy were made available in early 2006. The costumes are "Mickey Mouse Club", "Pin Trading", "Safari", and "Rain Wear", and sell for US$10 each. In October 2006, "Pirate Cap'n" and "Santa Mickey" costumes were made available for US$12 each. The "Santa Mickey" sold out during December 2006 and was not available for order through the WDW Mail Order department. However, it returned for the 2007 Holiday season.

The toy was discontinued in fall 2008. The toy continued to work until September 2014. At that point Disney stopped servicing the infrared technology to focus more on their RFID technology used in their magic bands. The toy still works sporadically throughout the parks, however some locations no longer have the infrared transmitters needed for the toy to work, and the toy's knowledge of Disney remains stuck in 2008.

== Games ==
The original version of the toy provided a choice of three games, triggered by squeezing both of its hands at the same time.

- That Isn't Here: Pal Mickey will choose a theme park and will speak the names of park attractions, and the player has to squeeze the toy's hand or tummy depending on whether or not that attraction is in the chosen park. If Pal Mickey is used within any of the four Walt Disney World theme parks, Pal Mickey will automatically select the theme park that it is already in and will keep selecting the park until the person either turns off Pal Mickey or leaves the park.
- Mickey Says: Similar to Simon Says. The player must only follow Pal Mickey's direction if it is preceded by "Mickey says".
- Fast Friends: Pal Mickey will speak the names of Disney characters, and the player must respond to each in a specific way. For example, "when I say Goofy, squeeze my left hand" or "when I say the name of someone who can fly, squeeze my right hand."

These games are added in the "Happiest Celebration on Earth" and later versions of the toy, for a total of six games. The above three games are triggered by squeezing the toy's tummy and right hand at the same time; the below three games are triggered by squeezing its tummy and left hand at the same time.

- Follow Me: Similar to Simon. The player has to repeat a sequence of actions as directed by Pal Mickey, with one additional action being added to the sequence each time.
- Try 'n' Keep Up: The player must react quickly to Pal Mickey's directions.
- Repeating Myself: Pal Mickey will speak the names of Disney characters, and the player must squeeze its tummy if it repeats a name it has already said.

== Technical information ==
Pal Mickey's electronics and batteries are encased in plastic housings (the original version's housing is black or white, the second version's is yellow, and the third version's is white) which can be accessed by unzipping the back of the toy. Beneath the zipper is an on/off switch which enables or disables the toy's squeeze and infrared sensors to prolong battery life.

The toys are shipped with batteries installed, and they are set to "demo mode" while they are on store shelves: they ignore infrared signals, and squeezing them will make them recite a sample of tips as if they were near park attractions.

It has been reported that the infrared transmitters in the parks are able to identify individual Pal Mickey toys and roughly track their locations as they are carried around, thereby letting Disney collect information about guests' progress through the parks. This is false. The toys do not contain a means for transmitting information. Ironically, Disney later released Magic Bands which provide services using RFID that allows tracking and identification of individual guests.
