= Interrogation =

Interviews by police, military or intelligence personnel

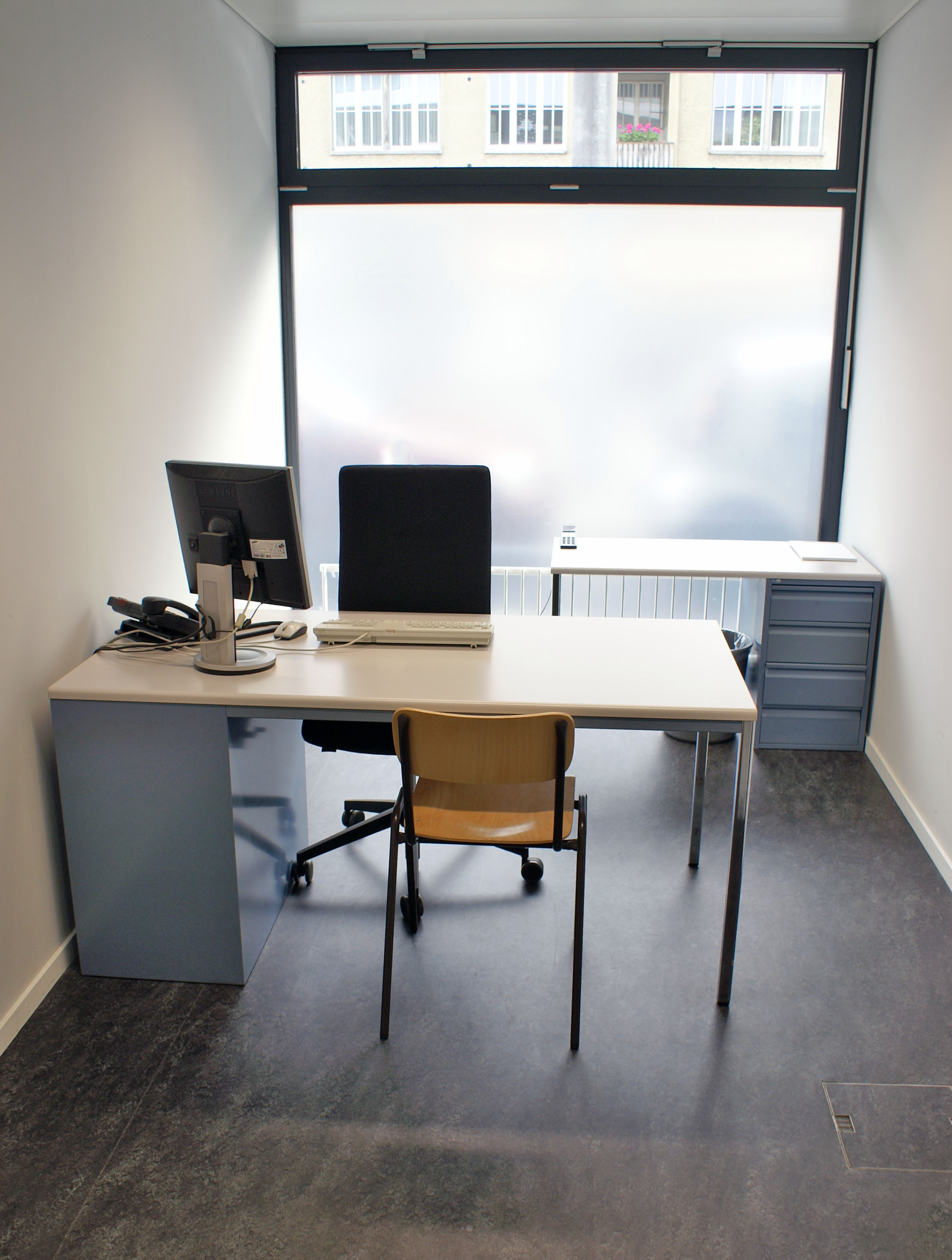
A police interrogation room in Switzerland

Interrogation (also called questioning) is interviewing as commonly employed by law enforcement officers, military personnel, intelligence agencies, organized crime syndicates, and terrorist organizations with the goal of eliciting useful information, particularly information related to suspected crime. Interrogation may involve a diverse array of techniques, ranging from developing a congenial rapport with the subject to torture.

== Techniques ==
=== Deception ===
Deception can form an important part of effective interrogation. In the United States, there is no law or regulation that forbids the interrogator from lying about the strength of their case, from making misleading statements or from implying that the interviewee has already been implicated in the crime by someone else. See case law on trickery and deception (Frazier v. Cupp).

In 2021, Illinois became the first state to ban police officers from lying to minors during interrogations.

As noted above, traditionally the issue of deception is considered from the perspective of the interrogator engaging in deception towards the individual being interrogated. By the 2000s, information began appearing in research studies on effective interview methods used to gather information from individuals who score in the medium to high range on measures of psychopathology, and who exhibit deception with interrogators.

=== Verbal and non-verbal cues ===
The major aim of this technique is to investigate to what extent verbal and non-verbal features of liars' and truth-tellers' behaviour change during the course of repeated interrogations. It has shown that liars display significantly fewer smiles, self-manipulations, pauses, and less gaze aversion than truth-tellers. According to Granhag & Strömwall, there are three approaches to non-verbal deceptive behavior. The first is the emotional approach, which suggests that liars will alter their behaviors based on their own emotional feelings. For example, if a subject is lying and they begin to experience guilt, they will shift their gaze. The second approach is the cognitive approach, which suggests that lying requires more thought than telling the truth, which in turn, may result in a liar making more errors in speech. Lastly, the attempted control approach suggests a subject who is lying will attempt to be seemingly normal or honest, and will try to adjust their behaviors to make themselves believable.

=== Good cop/bad cop ===
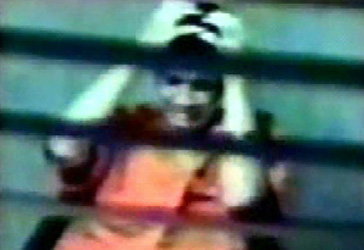
Omar Khadr pulling his hair in frustration during a February 2003 interrogation by Canadian officials

Good cop, bad cop is a psychological tactic used in negotiation and interrogation, in which a team of two interrogators take apparently opposing approaches to the subject. One adopts a hostile or accusatory demeanor, emphasizing threats of punishment, while the other adopts a more sympathetic demeanor, emphasizing reward, in order to convince the subject to cooperate.

=== Rotating interrogators ===
In the People's Republic of China, the "wheel battle" (Chinese: 车轮战; pinyin: Chēlúnzhàn) tactic involves "unrelenting continuous interrogation by multiple rotating interrogators".

=== Mind-altering drugs ===
The use of drugs in interrogation is both ineffective and illegal. The Body of Principles for the Protection of All Persons under Any Form of Detention or Imprisonment (adopted by the UN General Assembly as resolution 43/173 of 9 December 1988) forbids "methods of interrogation which impair the capacity of decision of judgment." Furthermore, the World Medical Association and American Medical Association, for example, both forbid participation by physicians in interrogations.

=== Torture ===
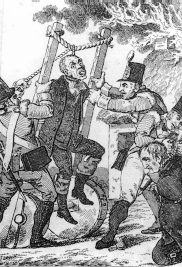
Half-hanging of suspected United Irishmen by government troops in 1798

The history of the state use of torture in interrogations extends over more than 2,000 years in Europe. It was recognized early on that information extracted under duress was deceptive and untrustworthy. In the third century AD, Roman imperial jurist Ulpian remarked that there is "no means of obtaining the truth" from those who have the strength to resist, while those unable to withstand the pain "will tell any lie rather than suffer it."

The use of torture as an investigative technique waned with the rise of Christianity since it was considered "antithetical to Christ's teachings," and in 866 Pope Nicholas I banned the practice. But after the 13th century many European states such as Germany, France, Portugal, Italy, and Spain began to return to physical abuse for religious inquisition, and for secular investigations. By the 18th century the spreading influence of the Enlightenment led European nations to abandon officially state-sanctioned interrogation by torture. By 1874 Victor Hugo could plausibly claim that "torture has ceased to exist." Yet in the 20th century authoritarian states such as Mussolini's Fascist Italy, Hitler's Third Reich, and Lenin's and Stalin's Soviet Union once again resumed the practice, and on a massive scale. During the Cold War, the American Central Intelligence Agency was a significant influence among world powers regarding torture techniques in its support of anti-Communist regimes.

== By country ==
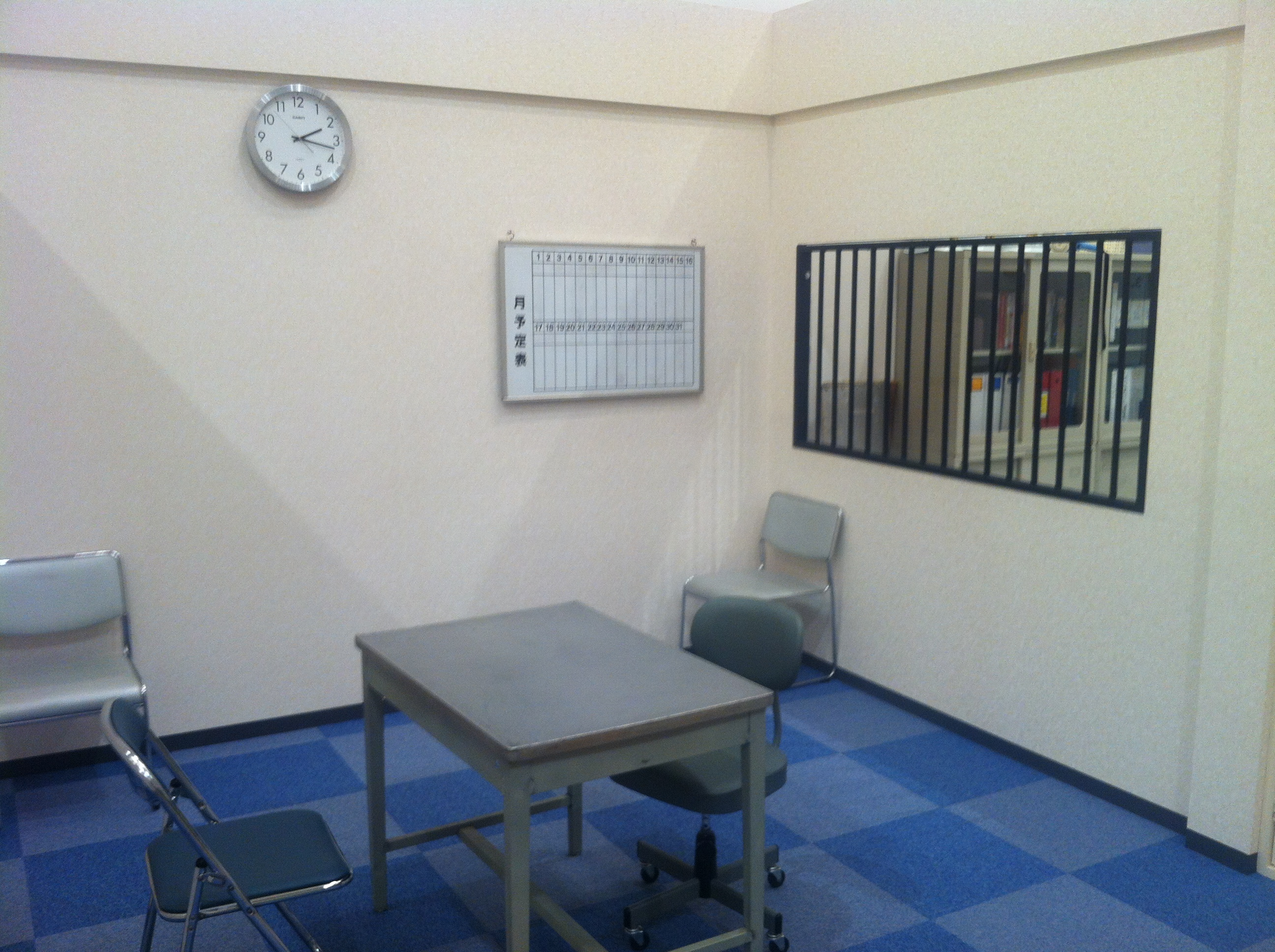
Film set of a Japanese police interrogation room

=== United Kingdom ===
Statutory law and regulatory law, various legal precedents called 'case law' also impact interrogation techniques and procedures. One of the first attempts by british courts to guide and set standards for police officers interrogating suspects was the declaration of the 'Judges' Rules' in 1912 by the judges of the King's Bench Division in England. These rules, although not law, still have weight in the United Kingdom and Canada.

British military personnel were found to have misused a number of techniques during the detention of suspects in Northern Ireland in the early 1970s. Police deception in interrogation was banned in the UK in 1984 with the passage of the Police and Criminal Evidence Act (PACE). A shift away from coercive and confession-driven methods has continued with the development of international frameworks such as the Méndez Principles on Effective Interviewing, which promote scientifically grounded, non-coercive interviewing practices growing from the roots of the PACE Act.

=== United States ===
==== Police interrogation ====
In the United States, police interrogations are conducted under an adversarial system, in which the police seek to obtain material that will aid in convicting a suspect rather than discovering the facts of the case. To this end, a variety of tactics are employed.

The Reid technique is widely used by U.S. law enforcement officers for interrogation purposes. It involves steps to obtaining a confession and methods for detecting signs of deception in the suspect's body language. The technique has been criticized for being difficult to apply across cultures and as eliciting false confessions from innocent people. An example is described in the analysis of the Denver police's January 2000 interrogation of 14-year-old Lorenzo Montoya, which took place during its investigation of the murder of 29-year-old Emily Johnson.

==== Constitutional protections ====
The Fifth Amendment to the United States Constitution, which states that one cannot be made to be "a witness against himself", prohibits law enforcement from forcing suspects to offer self-incriminating evidence.

As a result of the Miranda v. Arizona ruling, police are required to read aloud to suspects under interrogation their Miranda Rights afforded to them by the Fifth Amendment, such as the right to remain silent and the right to seek counsel. If the police fail to administer the Miranda rights, all statements under interrogation are prohibited from being used as evidence in court proceedings.

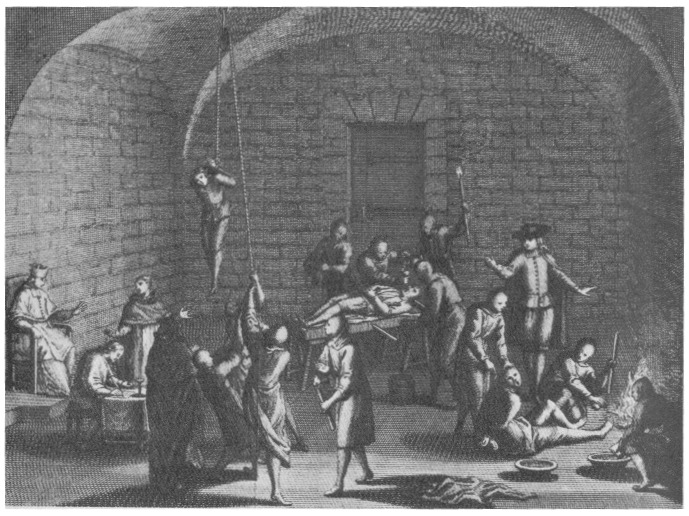
Inquisition torture chamber. Mémoires Historiques (1716)

==== Push for mandatory recording of interrogations in the U.S. ====
By the 2000s, a growing movement calls for the mandatory electronic recording of all custodial interrogations in the United States. "Electronic recording" describes the process of recording interrogations from start to finish. This is in contrast to a "taped" or "recorded confession," which typically only includes the final statement of the suspect. "Taped interrogation" is the traditional term for this process; however, as analog is becoming less and less common, statutes and scholars are referring to the process as "electronically recording" interviews or interrogations. Alaska, Illinois, Maine, Minnesota, and Wisconsin are the only states to require taped interrogation. New Jersey's taping requirement started on January 1, 2006. Massachusetts allows jury instructions that state that the courts prefer taped interrogations. Neil Nelson of the St. Paul Police Department, an expert in taped interrogation, has described taped interrogation in Minnesota as the "best tool ever forced down our throats".

== See also ==
- Covert interrogation
- Interrogation of Saddam Hussein
- Torture
- FM 34-52 Intelligence Interrogation
- Resistance to interrogation
- Méndez Principles on Effective Interviewing
