= John Kimmons =

United States Army general

John F. Kimmons
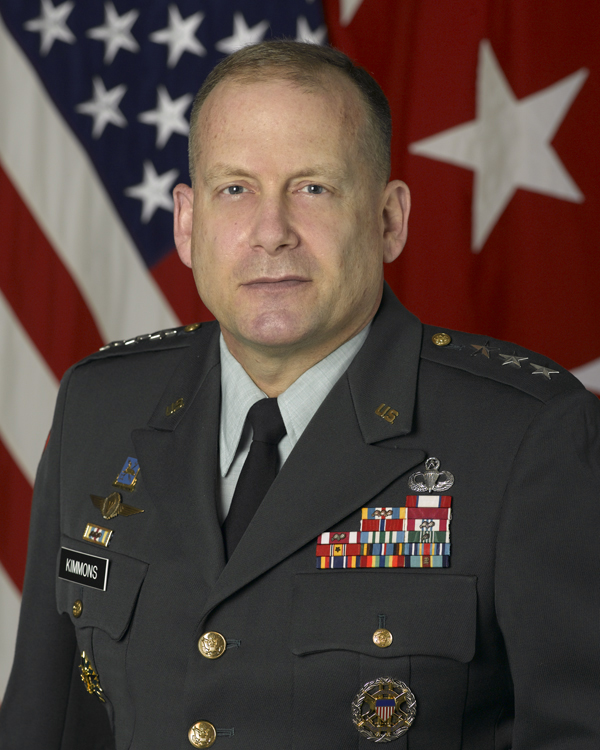
- Military career
- Allegiance: United States of America
- Branch: United States Army
- Service years: 1974–2010
- Rank: Lieutenant general
- Nickname: "Jeff"
- Commands: United States Army Intelligence and Security Command US Army Security Coordination Detachment 519th Military Intelligence Battalion (Tactical Exploitation)
- Conflicts: Grenada, 1983
- Awards: Distinguished Service Medal (2); Defense Superior Service Medal (4); Legion of Merit; Bronze Star Medal

John Frederick "Jeff" Kimmons is a retired American lieutenant general, who served as United States Army Assistant Chief of Staff for Intelligence, Commanding General, United States Army Intelligence and Security Command and chief of staff to the Director of National Intelligence. He was instrumental in the development of Army Field Manual, FM 2-22.3, Human Intelligence Collector Operations, which was the Army's response to actions at Abu Ghraib prison. Kimmons retired from active service on December 1, 2010, after 35 years.

== Early life ==
Kimmons was born circa 1952 in Rutherford, New Jersey, an inner-ring suburb of New York City, to Hildegarde "Hilde" Marie (née Koehler) and John Austin Kimmons. He graduated from Rutherford High School in 1970. Kimmons attended The Citadel and as a senior held the rank of Cadet Captain serving as Commander of the Regimental Band. Upon graduation, he was commissioned a second lieutenant in the Armor branch.

== Education ==
Kimmons completed his Bachelor of Arts degree in history at The Citadel in 1974. He also attended the University of Oklahoma, where he received a Master of Business Administration degree in 1982. Kimmons completed the Defense Intelligence Agency's Graduate Intelligence Program in 1979, United States Army Command and General Staff College in 1988, and the United States Army War College in 1995.

== Military career ==
=== Company grade years ===
Second Lieutenant Kimmons attended the Armor Officer Basic Course, and in the fall of 1974 transferred to his first duty assignment at Fort Carson, Colorado. From October 1974 to July 1975, he was a Platoon Leader in C Company, 1st Battalion, 77th Armor. From August 1975 to October 1975, he attended the Tactical Intelligence Staff Officer Course at Fort Huachuca, Arizona. Returning to his unit, First Lieutenant Kimmons received his first Intelligence assignment as the Battalion S-2 (Intelligence). After two years as a battalion S-2, he became the Assistant S-2, later S-2 (Intelligence), 2d Brigade, 4th Infantry Division (Mechanized).

Captain Kimmons was selected for the 1978-1979 Postgraduate Intelligence Course at the Defense Intelligence School at Bolling Air Force Base, Washington, D.C.

In June 1979 to June 1982, Kimmons served as an intelligence analyst for United States Pacific Command Intelligence Center-Pacific, Camp H. M. Smith, Hawaii.

From August 1982 to August 1983, he served as the electronic warfare officer/G-3 (operations) for the 82d Airborne Division at Fort Bragg, North Carolina. In September 1983, he assumed command of B Company, 313th Military Intelligence Battalion (Airborne), 82d Airborne Division. He deployed with the division to Operation URGENT FURY, contingency operations on Grenada in the Caribbean. After a year in command, Kimmons became the 313th Military Intelligence Battalion's S-3 (Operations).

=== Field grade years ===
In June 1985, Major Kimmons continued his assignment on Fort Bragg, but transferred to the 1st Special Forces Operational Detachment-DELTA (Airborne), where he served as assistant intelligence officer, later intelligence officer.

Following attendance at the United States Army Command and General Staff College in 1987–1988, he transferred to Germany. From June 1988 to May 1991, he was the deputy G-2 (intelligence) for the 8th Infantry Division. Lieutenant Colonel Kimmons became commander, 519th Military Intelligence Battalion (Airborne) at Fort Bragg on June 1, 1991. From June 1993 to June 1994, he served as director of operations, United States Security Coordination Detachment, Fort Belvoir, Virginia. From July 1994 to June 1995, he was a student at the United States Army War College at Carlisle Barracks, Pennsylvania

In June 1995, Colonel Kimmons became the director of intelligence, J-2, Joint Special Operations Command at Fort Bragg. In June 1997, he became the commander, United States Army Security Coordination Detachment.

=== General Officer Years ===
From July 1999 to January 2001, he served as deputy director for operations, National Military Command Center in the Pentagon, and later became the deputy director, Joint Staff New Administration Transition Team for The Joint Staff. In February 2001, Kimmons became the director for intelligence, J-2, United States Central Command (USCENTCOM), MacDill Air Force Base, Florida. He pinned on his first star in October 2000. Kimmons planned and orchestrated all-source theater-level intelligence crisis and campaign level intelligence in support of post-9/11 planning and invasion of Afghanistan (Operations Enduring Freedom) and Iraq (Operation Iraqi Freedom). He drove requirements for enhanced all-source fusion analysis, site exploitation, hard target collection, and integrated targeting.

After Brigadier General Kimmons completed his tour at USCENTCOM in July 2003, he assumed command of the United States Army Intelligence and Security Command at Fort Belvoir on July 1, 2003. Major General Kimmons pinned on his second star on November 1, 2003. He led a multi-disciplinary 12,000 person intelligence organization encompassing Theater Intelligence Brigades in support of all geographic combatant commands (U.S. Pacific Command and U.S. Forces, Korea; U.S. European Command; U.S. Central Command; and U.S. Southern Command), the Army's National Ground Intelligence Center (NGIC), and functional Signals Intelligence (SIGINT), Counterintelligence (CI), Human Intelligence (HUMINT), JSTARS Support and Security Clearance Adjudication commands. Kimmons effectively managed a multi-billion dollar intelligence budget.

In August 2005, Kimmons became the Army Staff's deputy chief of staff, G-2 in the Pentagon. Lieutenant General Kimmons pinned on his third star on October 1, 2005. He focused attention on intelligence modernization, pre-deployment readiness training and equipping for 40,000 Army MI soldiers and civilians in support of wartime operations in Iraq and Afghanistan, and theater/contingency operations worldwide.

From February 2009 until October 2010, Kimmons was the director of the Intelligence Staff for the Office of the Director of National Intelligence, Washington, DC. He assisted the DNI with orchestration of responsive intelligence support for the president, National Security Council, and IC. Kimmons led the IC Deputies Executive Committee process to accomplish critical IC reforms and intelligence integration actions, and provided effective oversight for a multi-billion dollar National Intelligence Program budget. His duties also included oversight of IC-wide analytic standards development, including IC Directive 610.

Lieutenant General Kimmons retired on December 1, 2010, after serving 36 years in the Army.

== Awards and decorations ==
General Kimmons' awards include the Distinguished Service Medal with Oak Leaf Cluster, Defense Superior Service Medal with three Oak Leaf Clusters, Legion of Merit with two Oak Leaf Cluster, Bronze Star, Master Parachutist Badge, Joint Chiefs of Staff Identification Badge, and Army Staff Identification Badge.

== Retirement ==
General Kimmons is a Distinguished Alumnus of The Citadel.

On January 22, 1997, Colonel Kimmons was awarded the Military Intelligence Corps Association's LTC Thomas W. Knowlton Award for Excellence in Intelligence, commemorating his significant role in Army Military Intelligence while assigned to the Joint Special Operations Command.

In January 2011, Kimmons became a Principal Director in Booz, Allen, Hamilton Inc., responsible for their Military Intelligence, Army Sub-Market. He also focuses on support to the Army G2 and Headquarters, US Army INSCOM.

== Personal life ==
General Kimmons and wife Kathryn have two children, Kurt and Marliese, daughter-in-law Jaime, and three grandchildren, Addison, Ian, and Kellan Kimmons.
