= Covert interrogation =

Interrogation Techniques

Covert interrogation can refer to several interrogation techniques. An example is the covert questioning of a subject in a neutral public place where people innocuously gather, with the intention of the unsuspecting subject not comprehending that the interrogation is occurring. The covert interrogator may present themselves toward an interrogation subject in a friendly manner, while concealing the ulterior motive of subtly questioning them. In this manner, law enforcement and military agencies can collect intelligence about various suspects, such as criminals and terrorists. Many additional types and techniques of covert interrogation and surveillance exist, and covert interrogation can occur for other various reasons, and by other types of actors.

The term covert interrogation also refers to interrogation techniques that may be overt in manner, but are hidden from public, media, governmental, and other types of third-party oversight, for various reasons.

== Devices ==
When the subject is unaware of it, the forensic examination of a subject's mobile phone and records is a type of covert interrogation. This pertains to other devices, such as computers, and modes of communication, such as telephone records.

== By country ==
=== United States ===
The United States government has engaged in the covert interrogation, surveillance and deportation of terrorism suspects.

Black site covert interrogation facilities created and maintained by the CIA have existed.

== See also ==
- Agent provocateur – Person who incites others to commit incriminating acts
- Baiting
- Black project – Highly classified military project
  - Black site – Clandestine detention center
- Enhanced interrogation techniques – Program of systematic torture by U.S. government
- Entrapment – Legal doctrine
- Frameup – Falsely prove someone guilty of a crime
- Informant – Person who provides information
- Intelligence assessment – Evaluation of sensitive state, military, commercial, or scientific information
- Labor spy
- Lidar (laser radar) – offers potential for covert surveillance
