= FM 34-52 Intelligence Interrogation =

United States Army publication

The US Army Field Manual on Interrogation, sometimes known by the military nomenclature FM 34-52, is a 177-page manual describing to military interrogators how to conduct effective interrogations while conforming with US and international law. It has been replaced by FM 2-22.3 Human Intelligence Collector Operations.

== Interrogations during the "global war on terror" ==
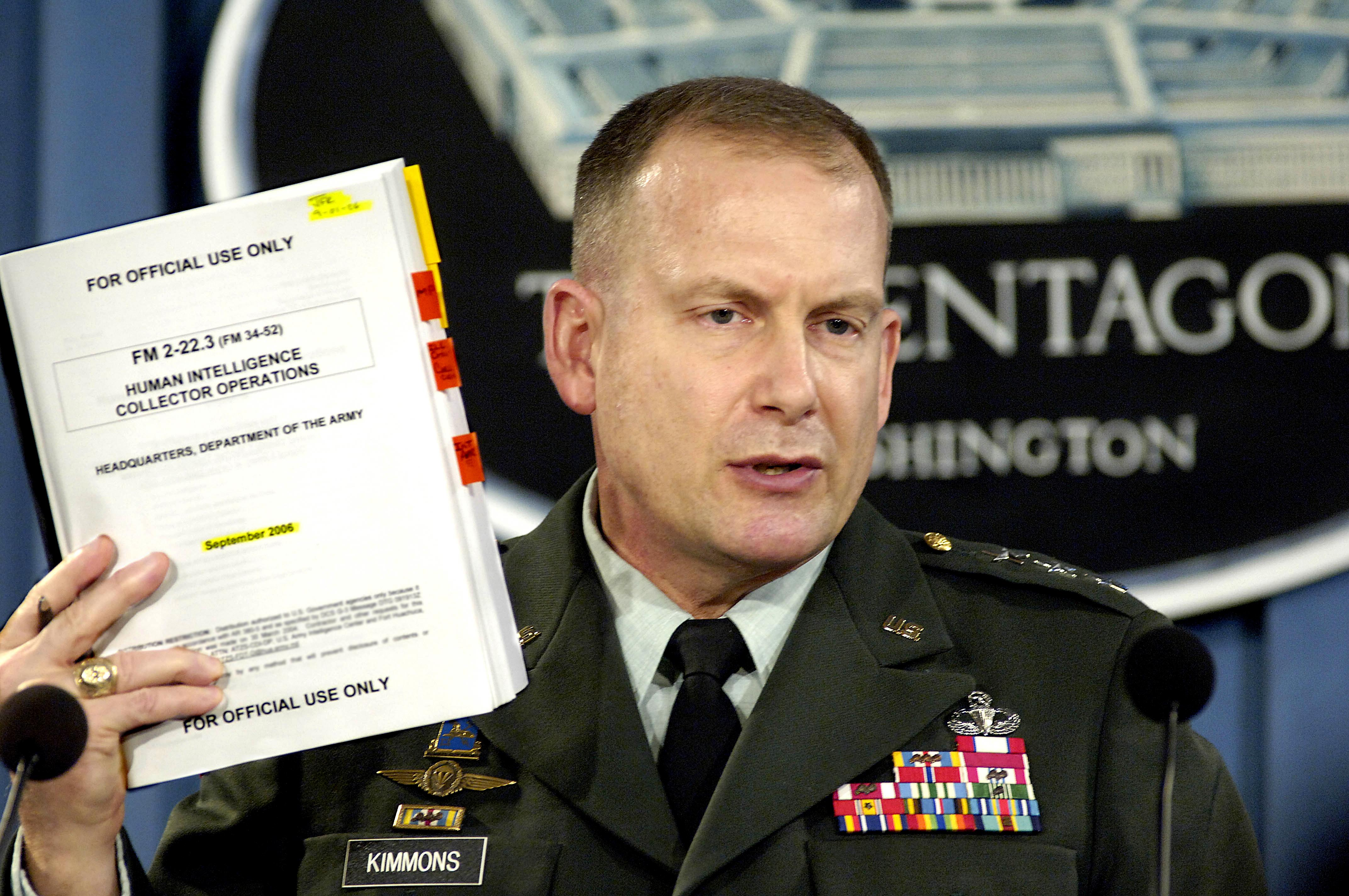
Release of the replacement manual in 2006

During the American war on terror, Secretary of Defense Donald Rumsfeld issued a set of so-called "enhanced interrogation techniques" that authorized conduct widely considered to be torture. This authorization was based on a series of controversial legal memos authored by the Office of Legal Counsel that sought to define torture far more narrowly than before. These authorizations were highly controversial, particularly in the wake of the Abu Ghraib torture and prisoner abuse scandal. Various revisions of the extended techniques were issued.

Rumsfeld intended the extended techniques to be used only on the captives the United States classified as "illegal combatants". However, extended interrogation techniques were adopted in Iraq, even though captives there were entitled to protection under the Geneva Conventions. General Geoffrey D. Miller, who was then the director of interrogation of detainees held in the Guantanamo Bay detainment camp, and some of his staff were sent to Iraq to help transfer their interrogation experience. Military intelligence troops had been using extended techniques in Afghanistan, notably Captain Carolyn Wood. General Ricardo Sanchez, the commander of American ground forces in Iraq, issued his own set of extended techniques after input from Miller and his team, and from Captain Wood.

== Detainee Treatment Act ==
On July 25, 2005, Senator John McCain – a prisoner-of-war and torture victim during the Vietnam War – submitted an amendment to a military spending bill, intended to restrict all US government interrogators from using interrogation techniques not authorized in the Army Field Manual.

On October 20, 2005, Vice President Dick Cheney met with McCain to try to convince him to agree that his amendment should only apply to military interrogators. Cheney wanted to continue to allow civilian interrogators, working for US intelligence agencies, to use more extended interrogation techniques. McCain did not agree.

McCain's amendment passed, and is now called the Detainee Treatment Act.

== Plans to revise the manual to allow extended techniques ==
On April 28, 2005, Defense Secretary Rumsfeld announced that the Army would be revising the manual. The revised manual would have spelled out more clearly which interrogation techniques were prohibited.

On December 14, 2005, The New York Times reported that the Army Field Manual had been rewritten by the Pentagon. Previously, the manual's interrogation techniques section could be read freely on the internet; the new edition included 10 classified pages in the interrogation technique section, leaving the public no indication about what the government considered not to be torture.

On June 5, 2006, the Los Angeles Times reported that the Pentagon's revisions would remove the proscription against "humiliating and degrading treatment", and other proscriptions from article 3 of the third Geneva Convention. The LA Times reported that the State Department had argued against the revisions because of the effect it would have on the world's opinion of the United States.

In 2006, there was an ongoing debate over whether the interrogation section should be classified. The New York Times reported that the Pentagon was considering making the interrogation section public once again, but the Pentagon made no formal announcement of its intentions.

On September 6, 2006, the U.S. Army announced the publication of Field Manual (FM) 2-22.3, "Human Intelligence Collector Operations". The Army's news release stated that Field Manual 2-22.3 replaced Field Manual 34-52 (published in 1992). The new manual specifically prohibits many of the controversial enhanced interrogation techniques (including "waterboarding") which brought the matter to public attention, and also stipulates that the list is not all-inclusive of prohibited actions.

== See also ==
- Extrajudicial prisoners of the United States
