= Gillian Wu =

Canadian immunologist

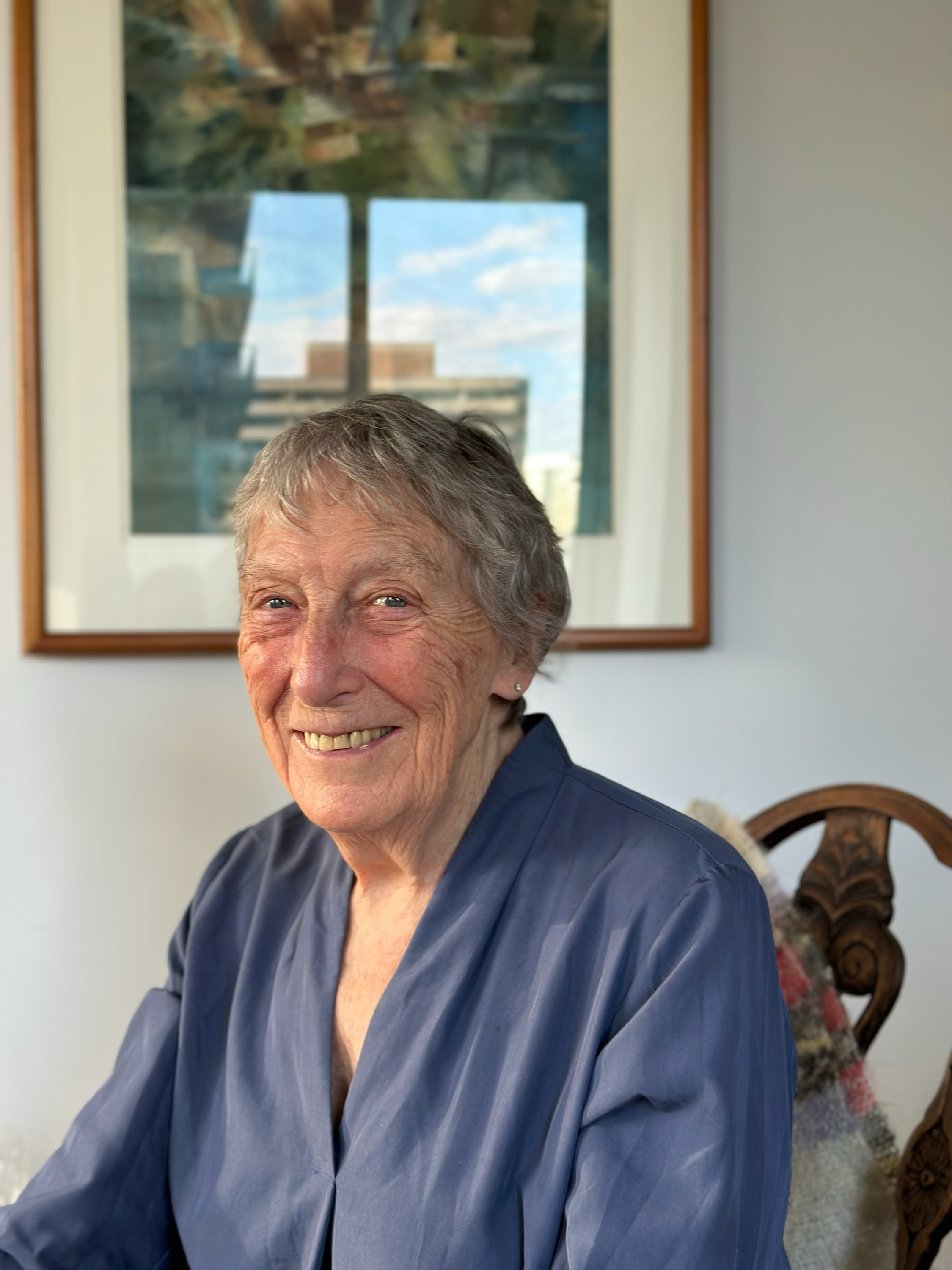
- Wu in 2024
- Born: Gillian Elizabeth Edwards; 1943 (age 82–83); London, England, UK
- Citizenship: Canadian
- Education: McMaster University (BS); University of Toronto (MS, PhD)
- Known for: York University's first woman dean of science and engineering
- Spouse: Alan Ming-ta Wu
- Children: 2, including Tim
- Scientific career
- Fields: Immunology
- Workplaces: Basel Institute for Immunology; University of Toronto; York University
- Thesis: Molecular Genetic Analysis of Some of the Requirements for Immunoglobulin Production: Studies of Myeloma Variants (1984)
- Doctoral advisor: Helios Murialdo
- Other academic advisors: Nobumichi Hozumi; Marc Shulman

Gillian Elizabeth Wu (née Edwards; born 1943) is a Canadian immunologist and the former Dean of Pure and Applied Science at York University. She is currently Professor Emerita in York University's Faculty of Science (Department of Biology) and Faculty of Health and also at the University of Toronto Faculty of Medicine.

== Early life and education ==
Wu was born in London, England and emigrated to Canada in 1951. Her family settled in Southern Ontario, where her father was a shipbuilder and her mother was a homemaker who encouraged her children in their studies.

Wu attended McMaster University in Hamilton, Ontario, Canada for her undergraduate studies, completing a BSc degree in Honours Biology in 1967. She went on to become the first female student to enroll in a graduate program in medical biophysics at the University of Toronto (1967–69). Robert A. Phillips supervised Wu's Master's in Science degree (MSc) research. Her thesis, titled Differentiation of Rosette-forming Cells from Clones of Hemopoietic Stem Cells, was supported by two consecutive graduate scholarships from NSERC and the Medical Research Council of Canada (CIHR). Wu's early interest in immunology was encouraged by Hardy Cinader.

When she began her master's degree (1967), she was the only graduate studies female student in the department.

== Scientific career ==
After completing her MSc, Wu did not proceed directly to pursue a doctorate. Instead, she worked as a biophysics technician at the Donner Radiation Labs in UC Berkeley (1969–71), and was a research associate at the National Cancer Institute, NIH, in Bethesda, Maryland, US (1975–76).

In 1980, she began her PhD studies at the University of Toronto in medical genetics under the supervision of Helios Murialdo, which resulted in four publications, including one in Cell. In 1984, she worked as a post-doctoral fellow at the Basel Institute for Immunology, after which she was recruited in 1986 to be an assistant professor in the newly formed Department of Immunology at the University of Toronto. In 1988, she moved to the Department of Molecular and Medical Genetics at the University of Toronto, staying until 1993, when she became a Senior Scientist at the Wellesley Hospital Research Institute. In 1998, Wu became a Senior Scientist at the Ontario Cancer Institute based in Princess Margaret Hospital.

Throughout this time, Wu retained cross-appointments as a professor in the University of Toronto's Departments of Medical Biophysics and Immunology.

In 2001, Wu became the first woman Dean of Science at York University, taking over from physicist, Prof. Robert Prince. Wu took over the evolution of the new engineering programme that was introduced by Dean Prince, overseeing a name change for the faculty that she led, from Pure and Applied Science to Science and Engineering. After serving her term, Wu remained as full professor in the Department of Biology, moving her main affiliation to the School of Kinesiology and Health Science (currently the Faculty of Health Sciences). She retired in January 2015 and continues to be a Professor Emerita.

Despite shutting down her research laboratory, Wu remains active in research. In May 2020, Wu received research funding to collaborate with York University biology professor Vivian Saridakis, to investigate the hypothesis that variations in the genomic sequences of the virus play a pivotal role in geographic differences in rates of COVID-19 infection, transmission and deaths.

Over the decades of her scientific career, Wu has been a visiting scientist and professor at the Pasteur Institute in Paris, France (1996) and at Clare Hall, University of Cambridge (2007), where she has been a Life Member since 2008.

== Research ==
Wu studies how diversity in antigen-specific B-cell and T-cell receptors are generated. As part of her PhD research, she identified a natural mutation in a cell line that inhibited the secretion of immunoglobulins (Ig). Research from her laboratory determined that variation in the strength of V(D)J recombination signal sequence affects the pattern of Ig gene rearrangement and expression. She also examines the role of the immune system in autoimmune diseases and cancers.

Wu's research focuses on the mechanisms of normal and abnormal development in the immune system. To this end, her research is directed in two major areas: 1. Understanding normal B Cell development with particular emphasis on the process of V(D)J recombination; and 2. Understanding abnormal development in the immune system with particular emphasis on studying human cancers and autoimmune diseases. Approaches include in vivo and bioinformatics analyses.

== Personal life ==
Wu married Alan Ming-ta Wu, a fellow graduate student who was in Ernest McCulloch's laboratory. They had two sons, Tim Wu and David Wu.

== Honours and awards ==
- Hardy Cinader Award, 2003
- John D. Reynolds Award, 2016
- Aventis Pasteur CSI Bernhard Cinader Prize for Research and Education, 2003
- Scientist, Medical Research Council of Canada, 1994 - 1999
- Scholar, Medical Research Council of Canada, 1989 - 1994
- Studentship, Medical Research Council of Canada, 1980 - 1984
- Graduate Scholarship, Medical Research Council of Canada, 1968 - 1969
- Graduate Scholarship, National Research Council of Canada, 1967 - 1968

== Selected publications ==
- Wu, G. E., Hozumi, N., & Murialdo, H. (1983). "Secretion of a λ2 immunoglobulin chain is prevented by a single amino acid substitution in its variable region." Cell 33(1):77–83.
- Ramsden, D. A., & Wu, G. E. (1991). "Mouse kappa light-chain recombination signal sequences mediate recombination more frequently than do those of lambda light chain." PNAS 88(23):10721–10725.
