= Bernhard Cinader Award =

Immunology award

The Bernhard Cinader Award is awarded annually by the Canadian Society for Immunology (CSI). It is presented to an immunologist who is an exceptional researcher working in Canada, a full member of CSI and who has an additional activity in which they excel.

This award was inaugurated at the first meeting of the CSI in 1987 and is named in honor of Dr. Bernhard "Hardy" Cinader. The recipient presents the keynote lecture at the annual CSI meeting.

== Recipients ==
The Bernhard Cinader award lectureship is given to a Canadian scientist who exemplifies distinguished scientific leadership and accomplishments in Immunology.

Year	Recipient	Lecture title
2025	Megan Levings	Regulating human immunity
2024	Fumio Takei	Long and winding road across the field of innate lymphocytes
2023	Zhou Ying	Respiratory Mucosal Immunity: A Trek Through Research and Self-Discovery
2022	Brad Nelson	30 Years in the Cancer Immunotherapy Field, and More OptimisticThan Ever
2021	Martin Oliver	A life of Wasps and Caterpillars
2019	Jean Marshall	Building Bridges with Mast Cells
2018	Michael Grant	Edge to edge: Look straight ahead
2017	Claude Perreault	Know Thyself
2016	Tania Watts	From planar membranes to TNFRs, a tale of costimulation and collaboration
2015	Eleanor Fish	The Art Behind Going Viral
2014	Pamela Ohashi	From Y Y Z and Beyond
2013	Mike Gold	When You Come to a Fork in the Road, Take it!
2012	Paul Kubes	Imaging the Immune System in Blood Vessels: Seeing a Whole New World
2011	Michelle Letarte	Experiments and Adventures with Endoglin and Immunology!
2010	Christopher Paige	Dancing with the Bees
2009	André Veillette	Signaling in the Immune System: T cells and Beyond
2008	Kent HayGlass	What is Normal?
2007	Rafik-Pierre Sékaly	Human Immunology: 15 years experience and an eternal challenge
2006	Chris Bleackley	Confessions of a Thanatologist
2005	Michael Julius	Une Histoire D'Amour
2003	Gillian Wu	G.O.D. is in the details: Life forces and the Generation of Diversity
2002	Linda Pilarski	Challenging the Status Quo: From Sombreros to Nanobiotechnology
2001	Bhagirath Singh	Life before signaling: peptides, microbes, and regulation of autoimmunity
2000	John Schrader	Science and Sunday afternoons: P-cells to proteomics
1999	Dean Befus	From worms to asthma: the road to little feG
1998	Jack Gauldie	From the Chicken to the Egg and with a Virus in Between
1997	Arnold Greenberg	The molecular basis of cell mediated cytotoxicity
1996	Peter Bretscher	Regulation of the immune response: the significance of quantitative and qualitative signals as physiological signs
1995	Dennis Osmond	A B-cell biography: the soil and the seed
1994	Tak Mak	And appear to be and appear not to be
1993	Tim Mosmann	T-cells and cytokines: why does the immune system have to be so complex
1992	John Bienenstock	From there to here
1991	Emil Skamene	Experiments of nature and natural resistance
1990	John Roder	The ghost of Metchnikov
1989	Rick Miller	T cell differentiation
1988	Alec Sehon	Tolerogenic derivatives of biologically active antigens for therapeutic intervention
1987	Hardy Cinader	Developmental change in the second half of life - challenge and opportunity
