= Hurdle (surname) =

Hurdle is a surname. Notable people with the surname include:

- Clint Hurdle (born 1957), American baseball player, coach, and manager
- Gus Hurdle (born 1973), English footballer
- Lana Hurdle, American public official
- Kevin Hurdle (born 1976), Bermudian cricketer
