= Murialdo (surname) =

Murialdo is a surname. Notable people with the surname include:

- Helios Murialdo
- Leonardo Murialdo
