= Steven G. Bradbury =

American lawyer (born 1958)

Steve Bradbury
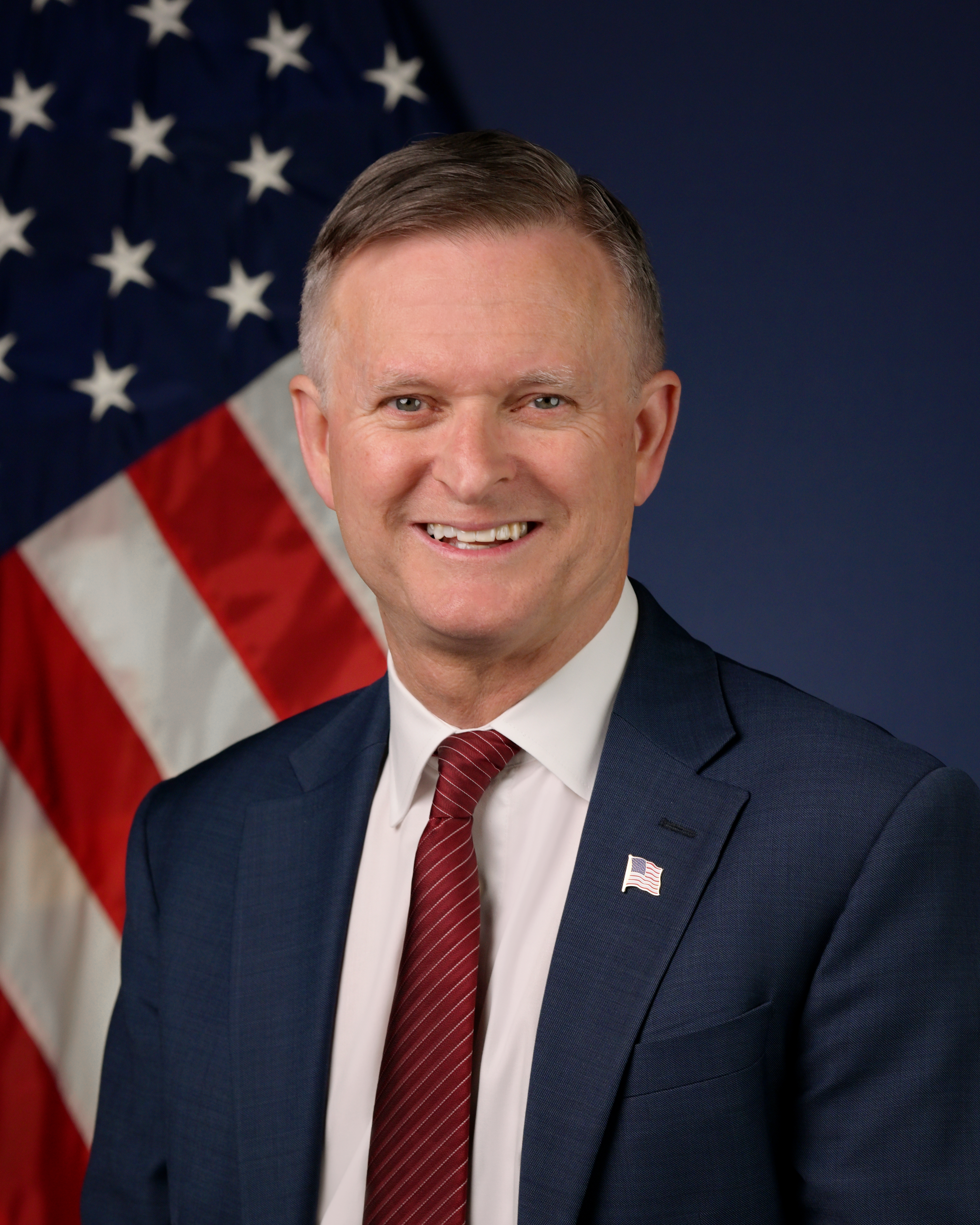
- Official portrait, 2025

14th United States Deputy Secretary of Transportation
- Incumbent
- Assumed office March 13, 2025
- President: Donald Trump
- Preceded by: Polly Trottenberg
- In office September 10, 2019 – January 20, 2021; Acting (Note: Bradbury was initially conferred the title of Acting Deputy Secretary until December 21, 2020 when the "acting" distinction was removed to use "Performing the Duties and Functions")
- President: Donald Trump
- Preceded by: Jeffrey A. Rosen
- Succeeded by: Polly Trottenberg

United States Secretary of Transportation
- Acting
- In office January 12, 2021 – January 20, 2021
- President: Donald Trump
- Preceded by: Elaine Chao
- Succeeded by: Lana Hurdle (acting)

General Counsel of the United States Department of Transportation
- In office November 28, 2017 – January 20, 2021
- President: Donald Trump
- Preceded by: Kathryn Thomson
- Succeeded by: John Putnam

United States Assistant Attorney General for the Office of Legal Counsel
- Acting; February 1, 2005 – January 20, 2009
- President: George W. Bush
- Preceded by: Daniel Levin (acting)
- Succeeded by: David J. Barron (acting)

Personal details
- Born: Steven Dean Bradbury; September 12, 1958 (age 68) Portland, Oregon, U.S.
- Party: Republican
- Spouse: Hilde Kahn (m. 1988)
- Education: Stanford University (BA); University of Michigan (JD)
- Awards: Secretary of Defense Medal for Outstanding Public Service

Steven Gill Bradbury (born September 12, 1958) is an American lawyer and government official serving as the 14th United States deputy secretary of transportation since 2025. He served as the General Counsel of the United States Department of Transportation during the first Trump Administration. He previously served as Acting Assistant Attorney General from 2005 to 2007 and Principal Deputy Assistant Attorney General from 2004 to 2009, heading the Office of Legal Counsel (OLC) in the U.S. Department of Justice during President George W. Bush's second term.

During his tenure in OLC, he authored a number of significant classified opinions providing legal authorization for waterboarding and other "enhanced interrogation techniques", a euphemism for torture. Bradbury was nominated to be the Assistant Attorney General for the OLC but Democratic Senators stalled his nomination, preventing the full Senate from voting on it, and Democratic leaders in the Senate instituted pro forma sessions of the Senate during scheduled recesses to prevent the President from giving him a recess appointment. Bradbury continued to serve as the acting chief of OLC until the end of the Bush Administration on January 20, 2009.

Prior to becoming General Counsel of the Department of Transportation, Bradbury was a partner at the Washington D.C. office of Dechert LLP. In June 2017, he was nominated by President Donald Trump to become General Counsel of the United States Department of Transportation. On November 14, 2017, Bradbury was confirmed by the Senate by a vote of 50–47 for the position. On September 10, 2019, he was further authorized to perform the functions and duties of the Office of the Deputy Secretary of Transportation as the Acting Deputy Secretary. On December 21, 2020, his official title was changed to remove the "acting" designation, but with him continuing to perform the duties of the position.

On January 7, 2021, Transportation Secretary Elaine Chao submitted her resignation to President Donald Trump due to the 2021 United States Capitol attack. As the official performing the functions and duties of the Office of the Deputy Secretary of Transportation, Bradbury became the acting Secretary of Transportation as of January 12, 2021. He remained in office until the change of administration on January 20, 2021.

From 2022 to 2025, Bradbury was a senior fellow at the Heritage Foundation, where he was a contributor to Project 2025.

== Early life and education ==
Bradbury was born September 12, 1958, in Portland, Oregon, the youngest of four children. His father, Edward T. Bradbury, died when he was 11 months old, and his mother supported the family by working nights and taking in laundry to supplement their Social Security income. He grew up in the Sunnyside neighborhood, where he attended Washington High School. He was student body president his senior year. Bradbury was the first in his family to graduate from college, earning a B.A. from Stanford University in 1980 with a major in English.

After working in publishing and as a legal assistant in New York in the early 1980s, Bradbury attended the University of Michigan Law School, where he received his J.D., magna cum laude, in 1988. He was an editor for the Michigan Law Review and a member of the Order of the Coif. In October 1988, following graduation, he married Hilde Kahn, his law school classmate.

== Career ==
From 1988 to 1990, Bradbury worked as an associate at Covington & Burling in Washington, D.C. In 1990–1991, he served as a law clerk to Judge James L. Buckley on the U.S. Court of Appeals for the D.C. Circuit. After working as an Attorney-Adviser in the Office of Legal Counsel from 1991 to 1992, he served as a law clerk to Justice Clarence Thomas on the Supreme Court of the United States from 1992 to 1993.

Following his clerkship for Justice Thomas, Bradbury practiced law with Kirkland & Ellis in Washington, D.C., first as an associate from 1993 to 1994 and then as a partner from 1994 to 2004. In 1998, Bradbury was named one of the top 40 lawyers under 40 by Washingtonian. In his law practice at Kirkland & Ellis, he focused on antitrust (mergers and litigation), securities law (including class action litigation and regulatory investigations), and various other regulatory, constitutional, and commercial litigation matters, both at the trial and appellate levels.

=== Office of Legal Counsel ===
In April 2004, Bradbury left private practice after being appointed as the Principal Deputy Assistant Attorney General at the OLC under Assistant Attorney General Jack Goldsmith, becoming Acting Assistant Attorney General in February 2005. He was nominated by President George W. Bush to be the Assistant Attorney General for OLC on June 23, 2005. The delay between his appointment and nomination was seen by some within the Justice Department as a "trial period", in which he would be susceptible to pressure. In May 2005, during this "trial period", Bradbury issued a set of opinions authorizing the use of waterboarding and other brutal interrogation techniques that are frequently described as torture; his nomination to lead the OLC occurred one month later.

His nomination was approved by the Senate Judiciary Committee in November 2005 but was never voted on by the full Senate, due to Senate holds placed by four Democratic Senators. Their resistance was due in part to his memoranda concerning the use of torture during interrogations in the war on terror and due to questions about his role in NSA warrantless surveillance programs. Bradbury's nomination was returned to the President under Rule XXXI, Paragraph 6 of the United States Senate at the end of 2005. President Bush unsuccessfully nominated him twice more in 2006, once in 2007, and for the fifth time in 2008. Senate Majority Leader Harry Reid offered to confirm 84 other stalled nominees in exchange for the White House withdrawing Bradbury's nomination, but this offer was declined by the Bush administration.

In August 2004, Bradbury issued a memorandum concluding that the Second Amendment to the United States Constitution secures an individual right to keep and bear arms. This opinion was cited throughout an amicus curiae brief by the Department of Justice in District of Columbia v. Heller.

In 2007, Bradbury approved an OLC opinion to the Social Security Administration that endorsed granting social security benefits to the non-biological child of a same-sex union.

Bradbury received a number of awards and honors while at OLC, including the Edmund J. Randolph Award for outstanding service to the Department of Justice, the Secretary of Defense Medal for Outstanding Public Service, the National Security Agency's Intelligence Under Law Award, the Director of National Intelligence's Intelligence Community Legal Award, and the Criminal Division's Award for Outstanding Law Enforcement Partnerships.

=== Torture memos ===
In May 2005, in response to requests from the CIA, Bradbury authored the "2005 Bradbury Memo" confirming that 13 so-called "enhanced interrogation techniques" did not constitute torture, including waterboarding, nudity, walling, stress positions, slapping or striking a prisoner, exposure to extreme temperatures, dousing with cold water, and forced sleep deprivation of up to 180 hours (7 1/2 days). A second memorandum, the "Combined Techniques Memo" found that the techniques did not constitute torture, even when used in combination. Bradbury's memoranda found the CIA's practices to be lawful if applied in accordance with specified conditions. Later in May, Bradbury signed a third memo, the "Article 16 Memo", which contained the opinion that the CIA's use of these techniques did not violate the Article 16 of the United Nations Convention against Torture, which forbids "other acts of cruel, inhuman or degrading treatment or punishment which do not amount to torture". These memoranda were described by Democrats as an attempt to sidestep anti-torture laws and subvert a 2004 public Justice Department legal opinion characterizing torture as "abhorrent". The Obama Administration released these memoranda on April 16, 2009.

In April 2006, Bradbury issued a "Memorandum for the Files" approving Appendix M of the 2006 Army Field Manual for interrogations.

In response to the 2006 Supreme Court decision Hamdan v. Rumsfeld, Bradbury described sections of Common Article 3 of the Geneva Conventions as "hopelessly vague", singling out its ban on "outrages upon person dignity, in particular, humiliating and degrading treatment" and arguing that military tribunals should admit evidence obtained via torture.

In July 2007, Bradbury issued the "2007 Bradbury Memo" addressing the legality of a subset of interrogation techniques in light of Hamdan and other developments, including intervening legislation such as the Military Commissions Act of 2006 and the December 2005 Detainee Treatment Act. The 2007 memo provided legal authorization and OLC approval for a more limited set of actions for use when interrogating high-value detainees. This approval encompassed six listed techniques, including temporary food deprivation (no less than 1,000 calories/day), sleep deprivation by being forced to hold a "standing position for as many as four days", and several types of physical striking.

In February 2008, Bradbury testified before a subcommittee of the House Judiciary Committee about the legality of waterboarding and other torture techniques. During questioning, Bradbury stated that the administration did not deem techniques to be torture unless they inflicted pain that was both severe and long-lasting. This testimony was criticized by numerous civil liberties advocates and legal scholars. Bradbury did not offer an opinion if waterboarding was illegal under the Detainee Treatment Act or the Military Commissions Act of 2006, but stated that these laws "would make it much more difficult to conclude that the practice was lawful today".

Near the end of the Bush Administration, Bradbury signed two memoranda for the files; these said that, during his tenure OLC had determined that certain legal propositions, previously stated in ten OLC opinions issued between 2001 and 2003 concerning executive power in the war on terror, no longer reflected the views of OLC and "should not be treated as authoritative for any purpose". In addition, his memo said that some of the underlying opinions had been withdrawn or superseded and that "caution should be exercised" by the Executive Branch "before relying in other respects" on the other opinions that had not been superseded or withdrawn.

On April 15, 2009, Bradbury's successor, Acting Assistant Attorney General David J. Barron withdrew four OLC memoranda pertaining to CIA interrogations, including three signed by Bradbury.

A 2009 report from the Justice Department's Office of Professional Responsibility cited "serious concerns about some of his analysis" but noted that "these issues did not rise to the level of professional misconduct." The OPR noted that other Bush administration lawyers "found Bradbury's reasoning flawed, politically motivated and simply wrong" and that Bradbury's memos amounted to "legal rationalizations" that "were simply written with the goal of allowing the CIA torture program to continue."

=== Return to private practice ===
Following his term in OLC, Bradbury returned to private practice as a partner at Dechert LLP in Washington, D.C., where he specialized in antitrust, administrative litigation and enforcement actions, general commercial litigation, and appellate matters.

In February 2012, Bradbury testified before the Senate Judiciary Committee on H.R. 3702, the "Due Process Guarantee Act of 2011".

During the 2012 presidential election, Bradbury served as an advisor to Mitt Romney's campaign on matters of national security law.

In the wake of the 2013 global surveillance disclosures, Bradbury testified before Congress and authored several editorials in defense of the National Security Agency's surveillance programs, including the collection of telephone metadata.

While working for Dechert, Bradbury represented Takata Corporation, which was at the time involved in negotiations with the National Highway Traffic Safety Administration (NHTSA) over a recall of its faulty airbags.

=== U.S. Department of Transportation ===
In June 2017, he was nominated by President Donald Trump to become General Counsel of the United States Department of Transportation. Bradbury's nomination was opposed by a coalition of human rights groups, including the American Civil Liberties Union, Human Rights Watch, Center for Victims of Torture, and the Center for Constitutional Rights. Following a preliminary hearing by the Senate Commerce, Science, and Transportation Committee, Senator Tammy Duckworth announced that she had placed a hold on Bradbury's nomination. The Senate operates by unanimous consent, granting any single Senator the ability to prevent action. Overruling Duckworth's hold, Republican Senators on the Commerce, Science, and Transportation Committee voted to advance Bradbury's nomination, which was still subject to confirmation by a full Senate vote. On November 14, 2017, Bradbury was confirmed for the position in a 50–47 vote, largely along party lines. Two Republican Senators, John McCain and Rand Paul, voted against Bradbury's confirmation, both citing his involvement in the torture program as the reason for their votes. Bradbury was sworn into office on November 28, 2017.

After former Deputy Secretary of Transportation Jeffrey A. Rosen was nominated to serve as Deputy Attorney General, Bradbury was selected by President Trump to concurrently perform the functions and duties of the Deputy Secretary of Transportation. After Secretary Elaine Chao resigned on January 11, 2021, following the January 6 Capitol attack, Bradbury took the position of acting secretary of transportation. Lana Hurdle succeeded Bradbury as acting secretary of transportation on January 20, 2021.

Bradbury was the presumptive nominee for deputy secretary of transportation in President-elect Trump's second term. During his confirmation hearing, Bradbury was questioned about his office's role in the investigations following two Boeing 737 MAX crashes, in particular regarding a report by the Senate Committee on Commerce, Science, and Transportation that concluded "that Mr. Bradbury's office obstructed the investigation by preventing interviews with Federal Aviation Administration employees who had key information and withholding documents the committee had requested." Bradbury stated that his office had been overwhelmed by Senate requests for information and did not intend to impede oversight. Bradbury was confirmed by the Senate in a party-line 51-46 vote on March 11, 2025, and sworn in two days later as the 14th U.S. deputy secretary of transportation in the second Trump administration.

=== Heritage Foundation ===
In December 2022, the Heritage Foundation announced that Bradbury would be joining as a distinguished fellow who would be working on their "2025 Presidential Transition Project". Bradbury is credited with writing the chapter of Project 2025's publication Mandate for Leadership pertaining to the Department of Transportation, and has served as an instructor for their Presidential Administration Academy. Politico reported that Bradbury's involvement with Project 2025 was seen as controversial due to his opinions authorizing detainee torture. Bradbury also contributed to policy proposals that would curtail the independence of the FBI and Justice Department.

== See also ==
- List of law clerks for the tenth seat of the Supreme Court of the United States

== Notes ==
Legal offices
Preceded by Daniel Levin; Acting	United States Assistant Attorney General for the Office of Legal Counsel; Acting; 2005–2009	Succeeded by David Barron; Acting
Preceded by Kathryn Thomson	General Counsel of the United States Department of Transportation; 2017–2021	Succeeded by John Putnam; Acting
Preceded by Jeffrey A. Rosen	United States Deputy Secretary of Transportation; Acting; 2019–2021	Succeeded by Polly Trottenberg
Preceded by Elaine Chao	United States Secretary of Transportation; Acting; 2021	Succeeded by Lana Hurdle; Acting
Preceded by Polly Trottenberg	United States Deputy Secretary of Transportation; 2025–present	Incumbent
