= Jean Marshall =

Canadian immunologist and acting Professor

Jean Sylvia Marshall, born in Birmingham, England, is a Canadian immunologist and acting Professor at Dalhousie University in Halifax, Nova Scotia, Canada. Marshall's work has investigated how mast cells are involved in the early immune response to infection and antigen. She is best known for her discovery of the previously unknown degranulation-independent immunoregulatory roles of mast cells in infection and allergy and their ability to mobilize dendritic cells.

Marshall's current research relates to studying innate immunity and local immune events and environment. Her work spans many fields, including immunology, inflammation, allergy, mast cell biology, chronic inflammatory disease, innate immunity, and cancer biology (specifically breast cancer). her lab also has a special interest in toll-like receptors in mucosal immune regulation.

== Biography ==
Marshall attended high school in Loughborough, England and then completed a Bachelor of Science (Hons.) in Biochemistry at the University of Manchester in 1980. She then received a PhD in immunology from Manchester, investigating regulation of IgE and the generation of autoantibodies to it in 1983. Her PhD supervisor was Eric Bell, the first to describe CD45 expression on memory T cells. After her PhD, she completed postdoctoral fellowships at the University of Manchester and at McMaster University in Hamilton, Ontario, Canada under the supervision of John Bienenstock, one of the fathers of mucosal immunology.

She was appointed assistant professor in the Department of Pathology at McMaster University in 1989, and associate professor in 1993. She then moved to the position of associate professor in the Departments of Microbiology & Immunology and Pathology at Dalhousie University in 1997, and became Full Professor in 1999. In 2005, she became the Head of the Department of Microbiology & Immunology.

== Research interests ==
Marshall has had a continued interest in mast cell biology and how it relates to many fields including Immunology, Allergy, Inflammation, Cancer, as well as others. Through her PhD she studied the regulation of IgE and how it coordinates immune responses, largely through interacting with receptors on mast cells.

Later in her career she studied mast cells more directly, characterizing their functions and receptors, in particularly in the context of virus infection. She determined that mast cells are involved in the response to viruses, and was the first to describe their specific response to Dengue virus infection. She then went on to further characterize mast cells and their surface receptors, including TLR2 which she discovered was critical for mast cell signalling during the response to cancer. One of her discoveries relates to the degranulation-independent roles of mast cells and their ability to mobilize dendritic cells during the early immune response to infection or antigen.

Her early work characterizing the role of the histamine receptor on mast cells has now become relevant to the context of cancer. She has completed murine studies looking at how over the counter Histamine 2 receptor antagonists, such as Ranitidine, can slow or reduce the growth of tumors such as those in breast cancer.

== Awards ==
- 2019: Hardy Cinader Award, Canadian Society for Immunology

== Leadership ==
- Dalhousie Arthur B. Macdonald Chair, CIHR

== Highest impact publications after 2000 ==
1. J.S. Marshall. Mast cell responses to pathogens. Nature Reviews Immunology. 4:787-799 (2004) Cited 864 timesaccordingto GoogleScholar
2. McCurdy JD, Olynych TJ, Maher LH, Marshall JS. Cutting edge: distinct Toll-like receptor 2 activators selectively induce different classes of mediator production from human mast cells. Journal of Immunology. 2003 Feb 15;170(4):1625-9. Cited 404 times according to Google Scholar
3. Dawicki W, Marshall JS. New and emerging roles for mast cells in host defence. Current opinion in immunology. 2007 Feb 1;19(1):31-8. Cited 307 times according to Google Scholar
4. McCurdy JD, Lin TJ, Marshall JS. Toll‐like receptor 4‐mediated activation of murine mast cells. Journal of leukocyte biology. 2001 Dec;70(6):977-84. Cited 235 times according to Google Scholar
5. Marshall JS, Jawdat DM. Mast cells in innate immunity. Journal of allergy and clinical immunology. 2004 Jul 1;114(1):21-7. Cited 230 times according to Google Scholar
