= Alan Ming-ta Wu =

Taiwanese-American biologist and immunologist (1938/39–1981)

Alan Wu
- 吳明達
- Born: 1938 or 1939; Tainan, Taiwan
- Died: February 23, 1981 (aged 42); Toronto, Canada
- Education: National Taiwan University (MD); University of Toronto (PhD)
- Known for: T cell research
- Spouse: Gillian Edwards
- Children: 2, including Tim
- Scientific career
- Fields: Molecular biology Immunology
- Institutions: University of Toronto; National Institutes of Health; University of California, Berkeley
- Thesis: Cytological Studies of Potential of Hemopoietic Stem Cells for Differentiation (1968)

Chinese name
- Traditional Chinese: 吳明達
- Hanyu Pinyin: Wú Míngdá
- Wade–Giles: Wu^{2} Ming^{2}-ta^{2}

Alan Ming-ta Wu (Chinese: 吳明達; 1938/1939 – 1981) was a Taiwanese molecular biologist and immunologist who developed techniques to grow hematopoietic stem cells in cell culture.

== Early life and education ==
Wu was born in Tainan, Taiwan, and graduated from Chang Jung Senior High School in Tainan. He attended medical school at National Taiwan University, earning his M.D., then served for two years as a medical officer in the Republic of China Army.

== Research ==
Wu conducted research for his PhD in medical biophysics with Till & McCulloch at the Ontario Cancer Institute in Toronto. Wu's PhD work demonstrated the relation between bone marrow and T cells. He was the first to grow stem cells (then called colony forming cells) in cell culture. This allowed Wu to transplant a single cell that generated the entire hematopoietic system in a mouse.

Following his PhD, Wu joined Harrison Echols' lab in the US, performing pioneering work on the regulation of viral genes. They probed the mechanism whereby the cI protein of phage λ represses expression of viral genes through interactions with host RNA polymerase.

In 1971, Wu obtained a position as Senior Scientist at the NIH in Bethesda, Maryland. He collaborated with Bob Gallo on studying how oncogenic viruses replicate, which included studies of reverse transcriptase. Wu applied this knowledge to probe the effects of drugs on mouse tumours induced by oncogenic viruses. He became director of molecular biology at cancer research firm Litton Bionetics Inc.

Wu returned to Toronto in 1976 to take up a position as an Associate Professor of Anatomy. His lab developed techniques for the long-term culture of human T cell progenitors, enabling detailed analysis of T cell biology.

The Institute of Medical Sciences at University of Toronto presents their annual Alan Wu Poster Prize to the most outstanding poster presentations at IMS Scientific Day. This award in honour of Wu notes that "He was well recognized for his research excellence, his passion for science and his strong belief in the value of translational medicine."

== Personal details ==
Wu married Gillian Edwards, a fellow graduate student. They have two sons, Tim Wu and David Wu.

Wu was active in the Taiwan independence movement.

Wu was an avid runner, completing ten marathons in the five years before his death.

Wu died from a brain tumour in 1981.
