= Pamela Ohashi =

Canadian medical researcher

- Education: University of Toronto
- Awards: Robert L Noble Prize 2018; Hardy Cinader Award 2014
- Scientific career
- Fields: Cancer Immunotherapy
- Workplaces: University of Toronto; Princess Margaret Hospital
- Thesis: Molecular analysis and expression of T cell antigen receptor genes
- Doctoral advisor: Tak Wah Mak

Pamela Sumiko Ohashi, PhD, FRSC is a Canadian medical researcher. She is co-director of the Campbell Family Institute for Breast Cancer Research, director of the Cancer Immune Therapy Program at the Princess Margaret Cancer Centre and a professor at the University of Toronto.

== Education ==
Ohashi obtained her BSc in biology from York University in 1982.

She received her PhD from the University of Toronto Department of Immunology in 1988. Her graduate supervisor was Tak Wah Mak.

== Scientific career ==
In her undergraduate studies at York University, Ohashi did wet lab research in the laboratories of James Friesen, John Heddle, and Ron Pearlman.

Following an interest in immunology, she pursued a PhD in Tak Mak’s lab at Princess Margaret Hospital, graduating in 1988.

Ohashi conducted post-doctoral research with Rolf Zinkernagel and Hans Hengartner at the University of Zurich until 1991.

In 1992, Ohashi established a research program at Princess Margaret Hospital, where she is now a Senior Scientist.

Ohashi is a Professor in the Departments of Medical Biophysics and Immunology at the University of Toronto.

At Princess Margaret Cancer Centre, Ohashi is Co-Director of the Campbell Family Institute for Breast Cancer Research, and Director of the Cancer Immune Therapy Program.

Her achievements resulted in her appointment as Canada Research Chair in Autoimmunity and Tumour Immunity.

== Research ==
Ohashi undertook a fourth year undergraduate research project with Dr Ron Pearlman on genomic analysis of Tetrahymena repetitive sequences.

In her PhD research on T Cell Receptors (TCR), Ohashi found that expression of beta chain cDNA was essential for the expression of a functional TCR/CD3 complex on the cell surface. This complex was shown to be responsible for mediating signal transduction via specific stimulation of the TCR of Jurkat cells. She created mouse lines with transgenic T cells expressing rearranged TCR genes and showed evidence supporting the model that commitment to certain T cell lineages occurs prior to the rearrangement of the composite receptor genes.

Ohashi’s early work focused on understanding basic mechanisms of T cell tolerance versus activation. She was a pioneer in showing conclusively that thymocyte selection is based on an affinity/avidity model. She was also the first to demonstrate that self-reactive peripheral T cells can remain in a naïve state in the T cell repertoire; a concept that has become widely known as T cell “ignorance”.

This has led to Ohashi’s current approach in understanding how to manipulate and improve cytotoxic T cells to enhance the immune response against cancer. She demonstrated that ignorant T cells could be activated against tumours and showed that altering the molecular programming of dendritic cells can alter the steady state and promote T cell activation in the absence of conventional dendritic cell maturation signals. This is a novel way to break T cell tolerance in vivo and provides important insights into potential mechanisms of autoimmunity.

Ohashi directs the translational program of Princess Margaret Cancer Centre's Cancer Immune Therapy Program, designing and running clinical trials using novel immune therapeutic approaches to treat cancer patients. Ohashi was a key investigator on the first Phase I clinical trial to use adoptive cell therapy for ovarian cancer.

== Awards and distinctions ==
2018: Robert L Noble Prize

2015: Member of the Board of Directors of the Society for Immunotherapy of Cancer

2014: Hardy Cinader Award

2011: CSI Investigator Award

2006: Fellow of the Royal Society of Canada

2003: Pharmingen Investigator Award

1998: William E. Rawls Award

Chair of the AACR Immunotherapy Steering committee

Founding Senior Editor: Cancer Immunology Research
