= Daniel Levin (attorney) =

American lawyer

Assistant Attorney General for the Office of Legal Counsel Acting
- In office July 2004 – February 2005
- President: George W. Bush
- Preceded by: Jack Goldsmith
- Succeeded by: Steven G. Bradbury (acting)

Personal details
- Born: March 4, 1956 (age 70) Chicago, Illinois, U.S.
- Education: Harvard University (BA); University of Chicago (JD)
- Occupation: Lawyer

Daniel Bernard Levin (born March 4, 1956) served as Acting Assistant Attorney General for the Office of Legal Counsel of the U.S. Justice Department from July 2004 until February 2005. He is notable for having upheld legal opinions during the Bush administration that narrowly defined torture and authorized enhanced interrogation techniques. These opinions were mostly secret during this period, but rumors of abuse of prisoners were widespread, particularly after the 2004 Abu Ghraib prisoner torture and abuse scandal in Iraq. These opinions were repudiated in 2009 by the Obama administration.

== Early life and education ==
Levin graduated from Harvard. He received his J.D. degree from University of Chicago Law School in 1981.

== Activities during Bush administration ==
Daniel Levin was appointed to the Office of Legal Counsel (OLC) under President George W. Bush. In July 2004, he was appointed Acting Assistant Attorney General and head of the office. On August 6, 2004, he sent a letter to the Central Intelligence Agency advising the CIA that it was lawful to use waterboarding as an interrogation technique. He prepared early drafts of OLC opinions, later signed by Steven G. Bradbury, finding all 13 of the CIA's "enhanced interrogation techniques," including waterboarding, to be lawful under the federal torture statute, 28 U.S.C. 2340-2340A.

These opinions were issued in the spring of 2005 under the signature of James B. Comey, Deputy Attorney General, although he had objected internally and encouraged the Attorney General Alberto Gonzales in May 2005 to argue against them at a White House meeting. The lawyers were under intense White House pressure to approve these memos.

On December 30, 2004, Levin signed an opinion updating OLC's interpretation of the torture statute and replacing an unclassified August 2002 opinion by then Assistant Attorney General Jay S. Bybee. This 2002 opinion had been withdrawn by Jack Goldsmith, head of the OLC from September 2003 to June 2004.

ABC News reported in November 2007 that Levin himself had voluntarily undergone waterboarding in 2004 before declaring torture "abhorrent" and concluding that "waterboarding could be illegal torture unless performed in a highly limited way and with close supervision."

In September 2004, Levin wrote a letter to the general counsel of the Health and Human Services Department, stating the OLC's opinion that the anti-prostitution pledge could constitutionally be required from all U.S.-based organization receiving federal funds. This requirement was overturned by the Supreme Court in 2013 in the case Agency for International Development v. Alliance for Open Society International, Inc.

== Post-OLC Career ==
Levin is a partner at the Washington, D.C., law firm Foley Hoag.

Legal offices
Preceded by Jack Goldsmith	Assistant Attorney General for the Office of Legal Counsel; Acting; 2004–2005	Succeeded by Steven G. Bradbury; Acting
