= Kronos effect =

Efforts to maintain first-mover advantage

The Kronos effect is a term coined by Columbia Law School professor Tim Wu in his 2010 book The Master Switch: The Rise and Fall of Information Empires. It describes how companies that establish early dominance in a period of disruptive innovation will do everything in their power to maintain their first-mover advantage.

The name derives from Greek mythology, in which the Titan Kronos ate his own children in order to preempt the prophecy that one would dethrone him.

In The Master Switch, Wu described the Kronos effect as critical to the history of information technology. In his book, he gives the example of radio pioneer and American business executive David Sarnoff. Sarnoff was originally what Wu described as "a radio idealist," but later in his career when heading the Radio Corporation of America (RCA), he came to view newly emergent FM technology as a threat to incumbent AM businesses including RCA's own NBC network. Sarnoff went on to pressure the U.S. Federal Communications Commission to restrict the growth of FM in a variety of ways, successfully suppressing its widespread adoption for more than thirty years, and proving, Wu wrote, that "the best antidote to the disruptive power of innovation is overregulation."

The Kronos effect's role in the technological disruption cycle is to hurt innovation, efficiency, openness and decentralization.

Other examples from Wu include:

- Western Union's failed attempt to suppress the telephone as a threat to the telegram
- Co-opting of the nascent television industry by existing radio networks like the National Broadcasting Company (NBC)

== See also ==
- Monopoly
