= Tania Watts =

Canadian Immunologist

- Education: University of Alberta
- Known for: Adaptive Immunity Research
- Awards: Distinguished Fellow AAI 2022; Reynolds Award CSI 2018
- Scientific career
- Fields: Immunology
- Workplaces: Stanford University; University of Toronto
- Thesis: Structure and assembly of pili isolated from Pseudomonas aeruginosa strains PAK and PAO
- Doctoral advisor: William Paranchych

Tania H. Watts (born 1957) is a Canadian Immunologist, Professor at the University of Toronto, past President of the Canadian Society for Immunology and from 2009 to 2019 held the Sanofi Pasteur Chair in Human Immunology at the University of Toronto. Tania Watts holds a Tier 1 Canada Research Chair in Anti-viral Immunity (2021- ) and was named a Distinguished Fellow of the American Association of Immunologists, class of 2022.

== Education ==
Watts studied at the University of Alberta where she obtained her Bachelor and PhD degrees in Biochemistry. Her graduate supervisor was William Paranchych. She was supported during her graduate work by an MRC Studentship.

== Scientific career ==
Watts' graduate research examined the structure and assembly of pili from Pseudomonas aeruginosa.

Her post-doctoral work at Stanford University with Professor Harden McConnell demonstrated the immunological effect of antigen presentation in lipid bilayers and led to her interest in T cells and immunity.

Watts is Professor of Immunology at the University of Toronto. Her group was among the first to provide evidence for CD28-independent co-stimulation. Watts held the Sanofi Pasteur Chair in Human Immunology at the University of Toronto from 2009 to 2019. She is co-director of the Faculty of Medicine Flow Cytometry facility.

Watts is an active organizer in the Immunology community. She is a founder the Toronto Human Immunology Network, past President (2009–2011) of the Canadian Society for Immunology, and has organized international symposia.

Watts was a member of Ontario's COVID-19 Science Advisory Table until its dissolution in September 2022.

== Research ==
Watts used biophysical techniques to study the properties of pili isolated from Pseudomonas aeruginosa strain PAO and PAK for her doctoral work.

Watts' post-doctoral research encompassed biochemical methods and the microscopy techniques TIRF (Total Internal Reflection Fluorescence) and FRET (Fluorescence Resonance Energy Transfer). Her work showed that CD4+ T cells could be activated to secrete Interleukin 2 by a lipid bilayer containing MHC II and peptide antigens, and that MHC II, peptide antigens and T-cell Receptor form a ternary complex.

Watts' laboratory at the University of Toronto continues her immunology research, with a focus on T cells, adaptive immunity and infectious diseases. Her group examines how different TNF Receptor family members (TNFR) contribute to survival of lymphocytes to control viral infections. Her studies also demonstrate how TNFR activation contributes to inflammation and cancer.

Watts has applied her expertise in immunology to study the persistence of immunity to SARS-CoV-2 and the effectiveness of vaccines against SARS-CoV-2 in individuals affected by immune-mediated inflammatory diseases.

== Awards ==
- 2006 CSI Investigator award
- 2014 GSK Fast track challenge winner
- 2016 CSI - Hardy Cinader Award
- 2022 American Association of Immunologists Distinguished Fellow, class of 2022
- 2021 Canada Research Chair in Anti-Viral Immunity 2021–2028
- 2019 JJ Berry-Smith doctoral supervision award, University of Toronto
- 2018 John D. Reynolds Award, Canadian Society for Immunology
