= Kathryn Judge =

American lawyer and writer

Kate Judge
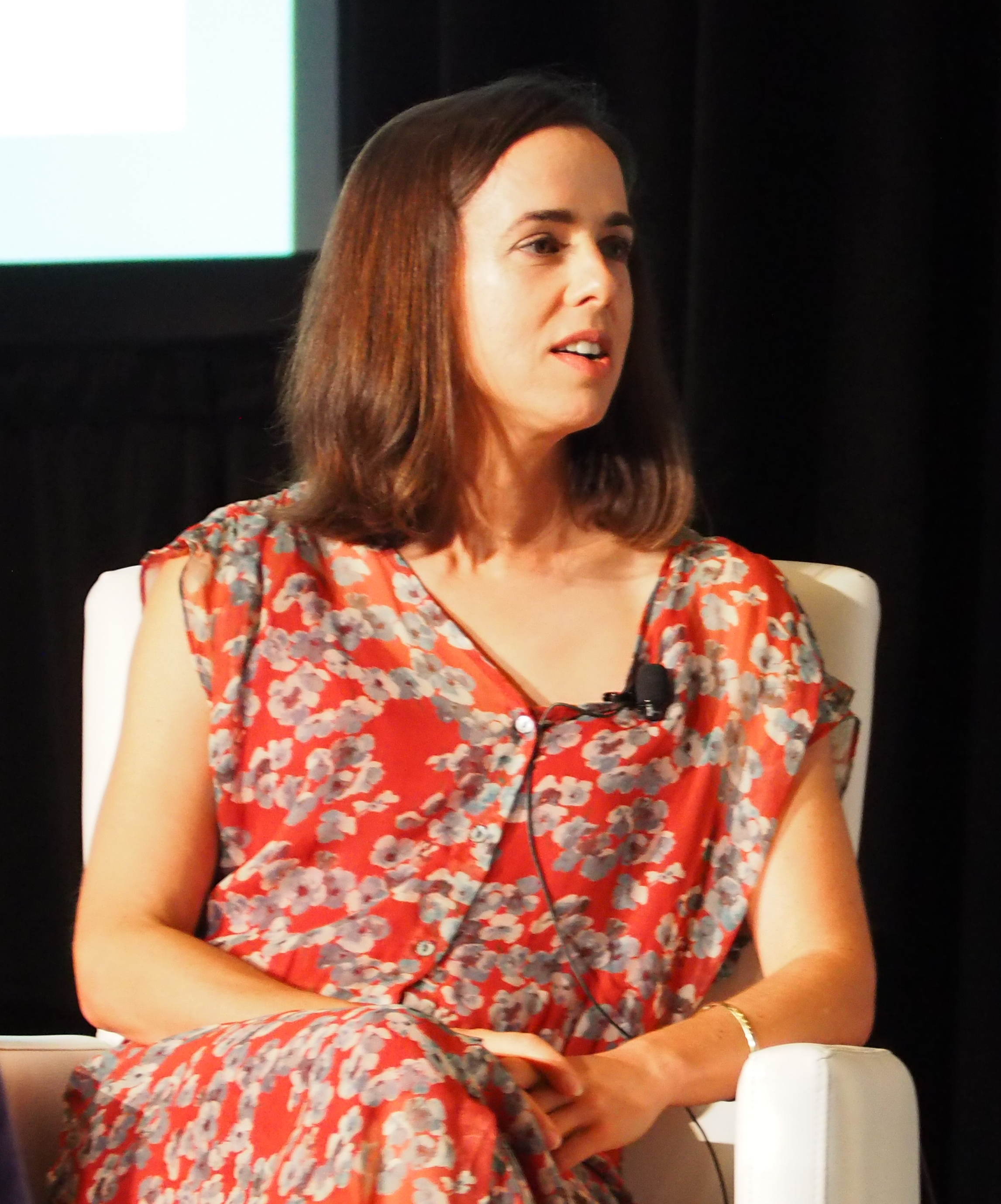
- Judge in 2022
- Spouse: Tim Wu
- Children: 2

Academic background
- Education: Wesleyan University (BA); Stanford University (JD)

Academic work
- Discipline: Banking law
- Institutions: Columbia Law School
- Website: https://kathrynjudge.com

Kathryn Judge is an American lawyer, and writer. She is Harvey J. Goldschmid Professor of Law at Columbia Law School.

She graduated from Wesleyan University, and Stanford Law School. She clerked for Richard Posner and Stephen Breyer.

== Personal life ==
Judge is married to Tim Wu, fellow Columbia law professor and lawyer. They have two daughters.

== Works ==
- Direct: The Rise of the Middleman Economy and the Power of Going to the Source, HarperCollins, 2022. ISBN 9780063041981
