= Eleanor Fish =

British immunologist living in Canada

Eleanor N. Fish CM
- Born: London
- Education: University of Toronto; University of Manchester; King's College London
- Scientific career
- Workplaces: University of Toronto
- Thesis: Structure/function studies on recombinant DNA-derived human interferons (1990)
- Website: Eleanor Fish at the University of Toronto

Eleanor N. Fish CM is a Canadian immunologist who is a Professor of Immunology at the University of Toronto. Her research considers how cytokines and chemokines interact with receptors in cells and tissue. During the COVID-19 pandemic, Fish tested interferon-alpha as a treatment for coronavirus disease.

== Early life and education ==
Fish was born in the United Kingdom and grew up in London. As a child she was interested in music and fine art. She completed her undergraduate degree at the University of Manchester. She moved to King's College London for her graduate studies, where she worked toward a master's degree in virology. For her doctoral research she joined the University of Toronto, where she studied cell biology. Her research established structure–function relationships in human interferons derived from recombinant DNA. She has studied art at the OCAD University.

== Research and career ==
Fish is involved with investigations into cytokines and the development of broad spectrum antiviral drugs. In an effort to understand rheumatoid arthritis and multiple sclerosis, Fish has investigated the immune responses that underpin autoimmunity.

In 2003 Fish led investigations antivirals that could into the severe acute respiratory syndrome (SARS) outbreak in Toronto. She investigated the use of interferon-alpha (IFN-α) corticosteroids to treat patients with SARS, and showed in a clinical trial that IFN-α treatment was associated with a reduction in impaired oxygen saturation, lung abnormalities and lower levels of creatine kinase. IFN-α is a naturally occurring protein that is produced in response to viral infection, and has been shown to have therapeutic properties in the treatment of viral infections. They do this by triggering an immune response as well as inhibiting the virus from multiplying. The success of these clinical trials prompted her group to examine the use of IFN-α as a treatment for emerging infectious diseases, including Influenza A virus subtype H1N1.

Fish has investigated the use of IFN-α as a treatment for ebola virus disease. In 2017 she led a clinical trial where she observed that patients treated with IFN-α had better outcomes than those receiving conventional treatment. After this study, the IFN-α developed by Fish was used to treat patients with Middle East Respiratory Syndrome (MERS). Fish worked with the World Health Organization to establish the effectiveness of ebola vaccines and therapeutic interventions.

During the COVID-19 pandemic, Fish provided regular expert commentary to the media and public. She called for widespread testing and contact tracing to better understand the spread of the disease. With regards to the observation that men are more likely to die of coronavirus disease than women, Fish said that women generally have a more robust immune system, as well as better hygiene. Early results from China indicated that interferon treatment, similar to the approach that Fish had used for SARS and Ebola virus disease patients, was effective against coronavirus disease. Fish proposed that "those who are severely ill with this coronavirus should be receiving a daily dose of interferon". In April 2020 Fish investigated interferons as a treatment for coronavirus disease, and participated as an advisor to the COVID-19 Therapeutics Task Force convened by Innovation, Science and Economic Development Canada.

== Awards and honours ==
- Elected Fellow of the American Academy of Microbiology
- 2010 Vivian & Seymour Milstein Award
- 2012 Canadian Society for Immunology Investigator Award
- 2013 Canada Research Chair
- 2015 Canadian Society of Immunology Cinader Award
- 2015 Elected an Associate Fellow of the African Academy of Sciences
- 2017 Leadership in Advocacy Award, Research Canada
- Member of the Order of Canada (2021)

== Academic service ==
Fish is the Executive Director of Beyond Science Initiative, a nonprofit that supports science students from marginalised groups. She spends one month of each year teaching at Moi University, a medical school in Kenya. At Moi Fish runs programmes in immunology, with a focus on women and maternal health. She serves on the executive committee of the Canadian Organisation for Gender and Sex Research.

== Selected publications ==
- Kong, Young-Yun; Feige, Ulrich; Sarosi, Iidiko; Bolon, Brad; Tafuri, Anna; Morony, Sean; Capparelli, Casey; Li, Ji; Elliott, Robin; McCabe, Susan; Wong, Thomas (1999-12-16). "Activated T cells regulate bone loss and joint destruction in adjuvant arthritis through osteoprotegerin ligand". Nature. 402 (6759): 304–309. Bibcode:1999Natur.402..304K. doi:10.1038/46303. ISSN 0028-0836. PMID 10580503. S2CID 4411606.
- Fish, Eleanor N. (2008). "The X-files in immunity: sex-based differences predispose immune responses". Nature Reviews Immunology. 8 (9): 737–744. doi:10.1038/nri2394. ISSN 1474-1733. PMC 7097214. PMID 18728636.
- Platanias, L (1999). "Signaling pathways activated by interferons". Experimental Hematology. 27 (11): 1583–1592. doi:10.1016/s0301-472x(99)00109-5. ISSN 0301-472X. PMID 10560905.

Fish serves on the editorial board of the BioMed Central Signals.

== Personal life ==
Fish was married in 1975, when she moved to Toronto. She is an artist, painting figure paintings and landscapes using watercolour inks.
