= Who Controls the Internet? =

2006 book by Jack Goldsmith and Tim Wu

- Author: Jack Goldsmith, Tim Wu
- Genre: Nonfiction
- Publication date: 2006

Who Controls the Internet? Illusions of a Borderless World is a 2006 book by Jack Goldsmith and Tim Wu that assesses efforts to control the Internet. Starting with a discussion of ideas for creating a borderless global community, the authors explore individuals, ideas and movements that affected the development of the Internet. They conclude that the governmental coercion has significant shaped the process, undermining efforts for a free Internet.

== Overview ==
The book is divided into three parts. The first follows the early development of the Internet, including the free vision of articulated by Julian Dibbell and John Perry Barlow as well as the work of the Electronic Frontier Foundation. It also presents government control over domain names, which shifted from Jon Postel to a Department of Defense' subcontractor called Network Solutions in 1991, as well as resistance to efforts by Postel and the Internet Society to ensure the legal protection of Internet freedoms.

The second part of the book, title "Government Strikes Back", explores the differentiation of the Internet as users around the world have sought information in their local languages and contexts. At the same time, various governments have used pressure to restrict Internet content, shown through examples such as Google de-listing Operation Clambake in response to a Digital Millennium Copyright Act filing by the Church of Scientology; Saudi Arabian filters blocking websites containing pornography, gambling, interfaith dialogue, and discussions about how to circumvent filtering; the neutralization of HavenCo; and Chinese censorship of the Internet and arrests of dissidents who contribute to it. This part closes with discussion of legal battles between the RIAA and file-sharing services, as well as the emergence of legal and illegal alternatives.

Discussion closes with "Vice, Virtues, the Future", a section that begins with a case study of eBay within the context of government protections and law enforcement. The authors conclude, based on the case of eBay and other cases where technology companies have complied with government regulations, that the Internet is not a borderless society as first envisioned but rather a bordered one. They speculate that cultural and political differences may result in a "technological Cold War", wherein the United States, European Union, and China develop their own competitive Internet platforms.

== Reviews ==
- This is a book that needed to be written. I like what it contributes to the debate on Internet governance. But I do not like what is likely to be its political impact on that debate. … The triumphalism of this book is premature. … –In The New Cyber-Conservatism: A review of Goldsmith and Wu's 'Who Controls the Internet?, by Milton Mueller, Syracuse University
- In the 1990s the Internet was greeted as the New New Thing: It would erase national borders, give rise to communal societies that invented their own rules, undermine the power of governments. In this splendidly argued book, Jack Goldsmith and Tim Wu explain why these early assumptions were mostly wrong: The Internet turns out to illustrate the enduring importance of Old Old Things, such as law and national power and business logic. By turns provocative and colorful, this is an essential read for anyone who cares about the relationship between technology and globalization. –Sebastian Mallaby, Editorial Writer and Columnist, The Washington Post

== See also ==
- Darknet
- Internet censorship
- Internet freedom
- Internet governance
- Netocracy
- Peer-to-peer
