= Fumio Takei =

Fumio Takei is a Distinguished Scientist at the Provincial Health Services Authority and Terry Fox Laboratory, part of the British Columbia Cancer Agency. in Vancouver. He also is a Professor of Pathology and Laboratory Medicine at the University of British Columbia, Canada.

== Education ==
In 1968, he received his bachelor's degree in biochemistry from the University of Tokyo, Japan. He continued his studies in immunology under the supervision of Dr. Julia Levy at the University of British Columbia(UBC) where he received his Ph.D. in 1976. His thesis was focused on “Specific Suppressor Cells in Mice Bearing a Syngeneic Mastocytoma” Takei held a postdoctoral position in Microbiology at the University of British Columbia. He also trained at the MRC Laboratory of Molecular Biology, Cambridge, England as a postdoctoral fellow with Drs. César Milstein and Ed Lennox before starting his own laboratory at the University of British Columbia.

== Research and career ==
Takei has more than 30 years of experience in immunology, particularly innate lymphocytes. From 1990 to 2010, he mainly focused on the development and regulation of natural killer (NK) cell functions. In the beginning, he was more interested in T cells than NK cells. When his lab first cloned Ly-49, they found that it is a member of a large genetically related family rather than a T-cell receptor(TCR). This happened before the first T cell receptor was cloned. Continuing this project was challenging at that time since the sequence of Ly-49 was not indicative of its function. However, after Wayne Yokoyama found that Ly-49 is MHC-I specific receptor on NK cells, Dr. Takei's lab continued working on other members of this family. They showed that each member of this family of highly polymorphic NK receptors, has distinct specificity for MHC I. This is one of the biggest contributions to NK cell studies.

In 2010, while his lab was working on NK cells, they found an interesting similarity between natural helper (NH) cells and NK cells progenitors. They isolated natural helper (NH)-like cells from allergen-treated mouse lung and found the production of cytokines type 2, IL-5, and IL-13 in these population. Identifying T cell-independent type 2 inflammation using an in vivo model of papain-induced lung resulted in finding a unique group of lymphocytes in mouse lungs, currently known as group 2 innate lymphoid cell (ILC2s). They showed that the production of Th-2 type cytokines in these populations involved in allergic inflammation. Moreover, they proved that ILC2s play a major role in allergen-induced lung inflammation by developing ILC2 deficient mice. More studies by his group showed other roles of ILC2s such as acquiring memory functions. His lab is currently studying the regulation of ILC2s and their functional and developmental relationship with other lymphocytes as well as identifying other ILC populations induced by different allergens like ILC3s. They are also working on differences between tissue-resident versus migratory ILC2s.

== Memberships ==
- Society for Mucosal Immunology: Milwaukee, Wisconsin, US
- Canadian Society of Immunology: Winnipeg, MB, CA
- American Association of Immunologists: Rockville, Maryland, US

== Selected publications ==
- Ghaedi, M., Shen, Z., Orangi, M., Martinez-Gonzalez, I., Wei, L., Lu, X., Das, A., Heravi-Moussavi, A., Marra, M., Bhandoola, A. and Takei, F., 2019. Single-cell analysis of RORα tracer mouse lung reveals ILC progenitors and effector ILC2 subsets. Journal of Experimental Medicine, 217(3).
- Halim T, MacLaren A, Romanish M, Gold M, McNagny K, Takei F. Retinoic-Acid-Receptor-Related Orphan Nuclear Receptor Alpha Is Required for Natural Helper Cell Development and Allergic Inflammation. Immunity. 2012;37(3):463-474. doi:10.1016/j.immuni.2012.06.012
- Akira Kubota, Satoko Kubota, Stefan Lohwasser, Dixie L. Mager, Fumio Takei. Diversity of NK Cell Receptor Repertoire in Adult and Neonatal Mice. The Journal of Immunology July 1, 1999, 163 (1) 212–216;
- Horley, K., Carpenito, C., Baker, B. and Takei, F., 1989. Molecular cloning of murine intercellular adhesion molecule (ICAM-1). The EMBO Journal, 8(10), pp. 2889–2896.
- Takei, F., Waldmann, H., Lennox, E. and Milstein, C., 1980. Monoclonal antibody H 9/25 reacts with functional subsets of T and B cells: killer, killer precursor and plaque-forming cells. European Journal of Immunology, 10(7), pp. 503–509.
- Takei, F., Galfré, G., Alderson, T., Lennox, E. and Milstein, C., 1980. H9/25 monoclonal antibody recognizes a new allospecificity of mouse lymphocyte subpopulations: Strain and tissue distribution. European Journal of Immunology, 10(4), pp. 241–246.
