= Lana Hurdle =

American public official

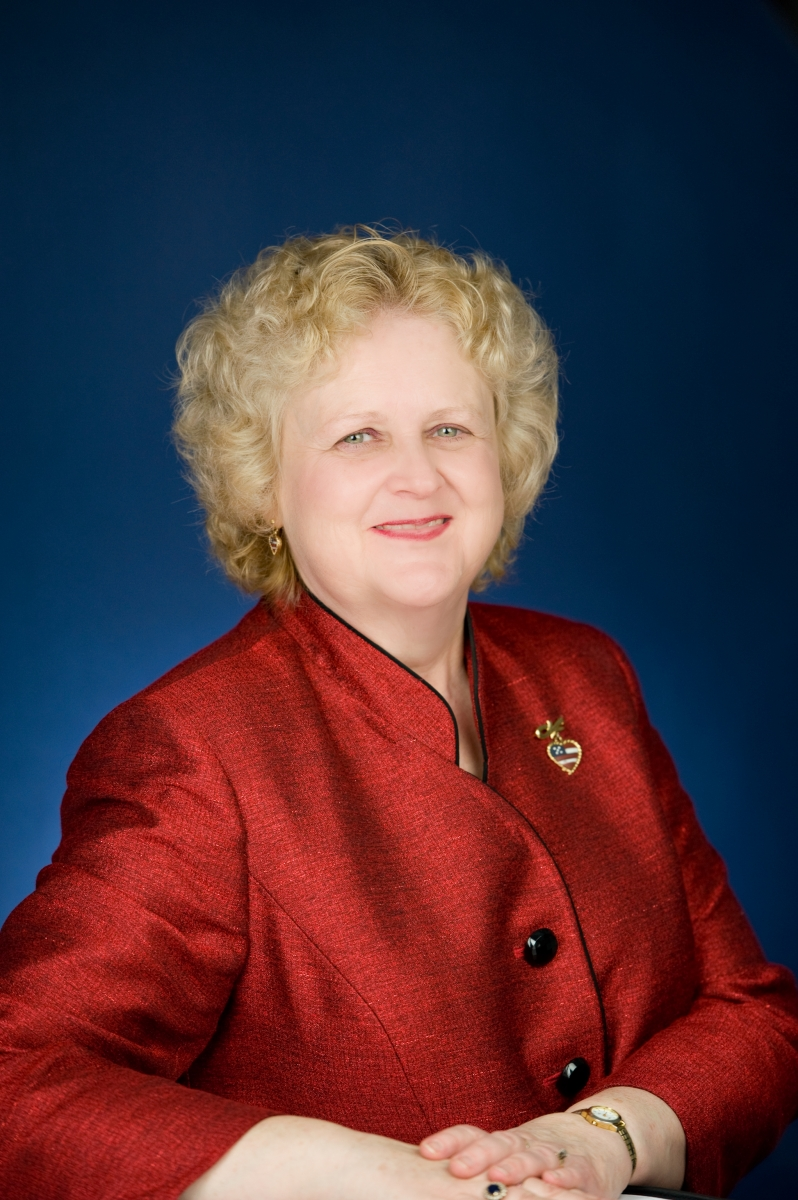

Acting United States Secretary of Transportation
- In office January 20, 2021 – February 3, 2021
- President: Joe Biden
- Preceded by: Steven G. Bradbury (acting)
- Succeeded by: Pete Buttigieg

Personal details
- Education: University of Virginia (BA)

Lana T. Hurdle is an American public official who served as the acting United States Secretary of Transportation in the Biden administration. Hurdle served in an interim capacity until Biden's nominee, Pete Buttigieg, was confirmed by the United States Senate. Hurdle serves as the deputy assistant secretary for budget and programs in the Department of Transportation.

== Education ==
Hurdle earned a Bachelor of Arts degree in government and foreign affairs from the University of Virginia in 1977.

== Career ==
Prior to her assignments at the Department of Transportation, Hurdle served as the CFO for the Peace Corps. She was the senior financial management official overseeing all financial management services spanning 77 countries world-wide.

Hurdle began her Federal government career at the Office of Management and Budget as budget examiner for the United States Coast Guard, Federal Trade Commission, and National Transportation Safety Board.

=== Department of Transportation ===
Hurdle is the Deputy Assistant Secretary for Budget and Programs at the United States Department of Transportation. She is the principal career deputy and the senior member, CFO, and assistant secretary for the budget and programs team. Hurdle directs the overall budget and program performance process for the department and supports the leadership team on a wide variety of projects. Hurdle has served as the department's liaison to the presidential transition of Joe Biden, providing advice and assistance to the senior career staff in preparing for a change in administrations.

Hurdle received the Meritorious (2006) and Distinguished Executive (2011) Senior Executive Service Presidential Rank Awards for her contributions in budget and financial management throughout her federal service.

== Personal life ==
Hurdle lives in Arlington, Virginia with her husband Robert.

Political offices
| Preceded by Steven G. Bradbury; Acting | United States Secretary of Transportation; Acting; 2021 | Succeeded by Pete Buttigieg |
