= Tim Wu =

American legal scholar (born 1972)

- 吳修銘
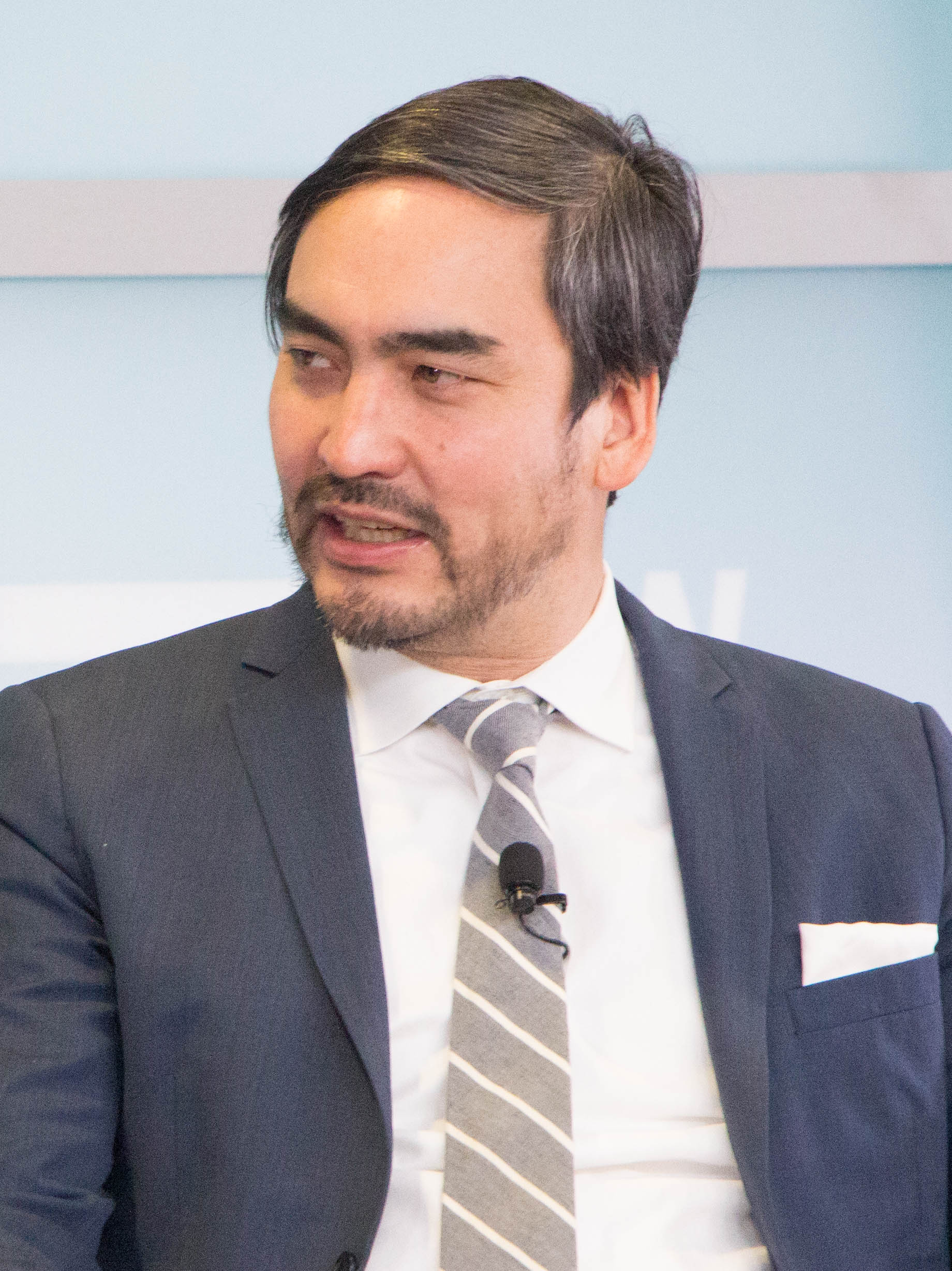
- Wu in 2014
- Born: Timothy Shiou-Ming Wu; 1971 or 1972 (age 54–55); Washington, D.C., U.S.
- Education: McGill University (BSc); Harvard University (JD)
- Known for: coining "net neutrality"; late 2010s revival of antitrust
- Political party: Democratic
- Spouse: Kate Judge
- Children: 2
- Relatives: Alan Ming-ta Wu (father); Gillian Edwards (mother)

Chinese name
- Traditional Chinese: 吳修銘
- Simplified Chinese: 吴修铭
Transcriptions
Standard Mandarin
- Hanyu Pinyin: Wú Xiūmíng
- Wade–Giles: Wu^{2} Hsiu^{1}-ming^{2}
- IPA: [ǔ ɕjóʊmǐŋ]

Timothy Shiou-Ming Wu (Chinese: 吳修銘; born 1972) is an American legal scholar who served as Special Assistant to the President for Technology and Competition Policy at the United States from 2021 to 2023. He is also a professor of law at Columbia University and a contributing opinion writer for The New York Times. He is known legally and academically for significant contributions to antitrust and communications policy, coining the phrase "network neutrality" in his 2003 law journal article, Network Neutrality, Broadband Discrimination. In the late 2010s, Wu was a leading advocate for an antitrust lawsuit directed at the breakup of Facebook.

Wu is a scholar of the media and technology industries, and his academic specialties include antitrust, copyright, and telecommunications law. He was named to The National Law Journal's "America's 100 Most Influential Lawyers" in 2013, as well as to the "Politico 50" in 2014 and 2015. Additionally, Wu was named one of Scientific American's 50 people of the year in 2006, and one of Harvard University's 100 most influential graduates by 02138 magazine in 2007. His book The Master Switch was named among the best books of 2010 by The New Yorker, Fortune, and Publishers Weekly.

From 2011 to 2012, Wu served as a senior advisor to the Federal Trade Commission, and from 2015 to 2016 he was senior enforcement counsel at the New York Office of the Attorney General, where he launched a successful lawsuit against Time Warner Cable for falsely advertising their broadband speeds. Wu also served on the National Economic Council in the Obama administration under Jeffrey Zients, and served under Director Brian Deese during the Biden administration. In the Biden administration, Wu notably helped author the 2021 Executive Order on Competition.

== Early life and education ==
Wu was born in Washington, D.C., and grew up in Basel and Toronto. His father, Alan Ming-ta Wu, was from Taiwan and his mother, Gillian Wu (née Edwards), is a British-Canadian immunologist. Wu and his younger brother were sent to alternative schools that emphasized creativity, and he became friends with Cory Doctorow.

Wu attended McGill University, where he initially studied biochemistry before switching his major to biophysics, graduating with a B.Sc. in 1995. He then attended Harvard Law School, graduating with J.D., magna cum laude, in 1998. At Harvard, he studied under copyright scholar Lawrence Lessig.

== Career ==
After law school, Wu first spent a year at the U.S. Department of Justice's Office of Legal Counsel. He then spent two years as a law clerk, first for Judge Richard Posner on the U.S. Court of Appeals for the Seventh Circuit from 1998 to 1999, then for Justice Stephen Breyer at the U.S. Supreme Court from 1999 to 2000. Following his clerkships, Wu moved to the San Francisco Bay Area, worked at Riverstone Networks, Inc. (2000–02), and then entered academia at the University of Virginia School of Law.

Wu was an associate professor of law at the University of Virginia from 2002 to 2004, a visiting professor at Columbia Law School in 2004, and, in 2005, a visiting professor at both the University of Chicago Law School and at Stanford Law School. In 2006, he became a full professor at Columbia Law School.

=== The Master Switch ===
Wu's 2010 book, The Master Switch: The Rise and Fall of Information Empires, described a long "cycle" whereby open information systems become consolidated and closed over time, reopening only after disruptive innovation. The book shows how this cycle developed with the rise of the Bell AT&T telephone monopoly, the founding of the Hollywood entertainment industry, broadcast and cable television industries, and finally with the internet industry. He looks at the example of Apple Inc., which began as a company dedicated to openness, that evolved into a more closed system under the leadership of Steve Jobs, demonstrating that the internet industry will follow the historical cycle of the rise of information empires (although Wu discussed Google as an important counterpoint). The book was named one of the best books of 2010 by several publications, including among others, The New Yorker, Fortune, Amazon.com, The Washington Post, and Publishers Weekly.

=== 2014 New York lieutenant gubernatorial election and aftermath ===
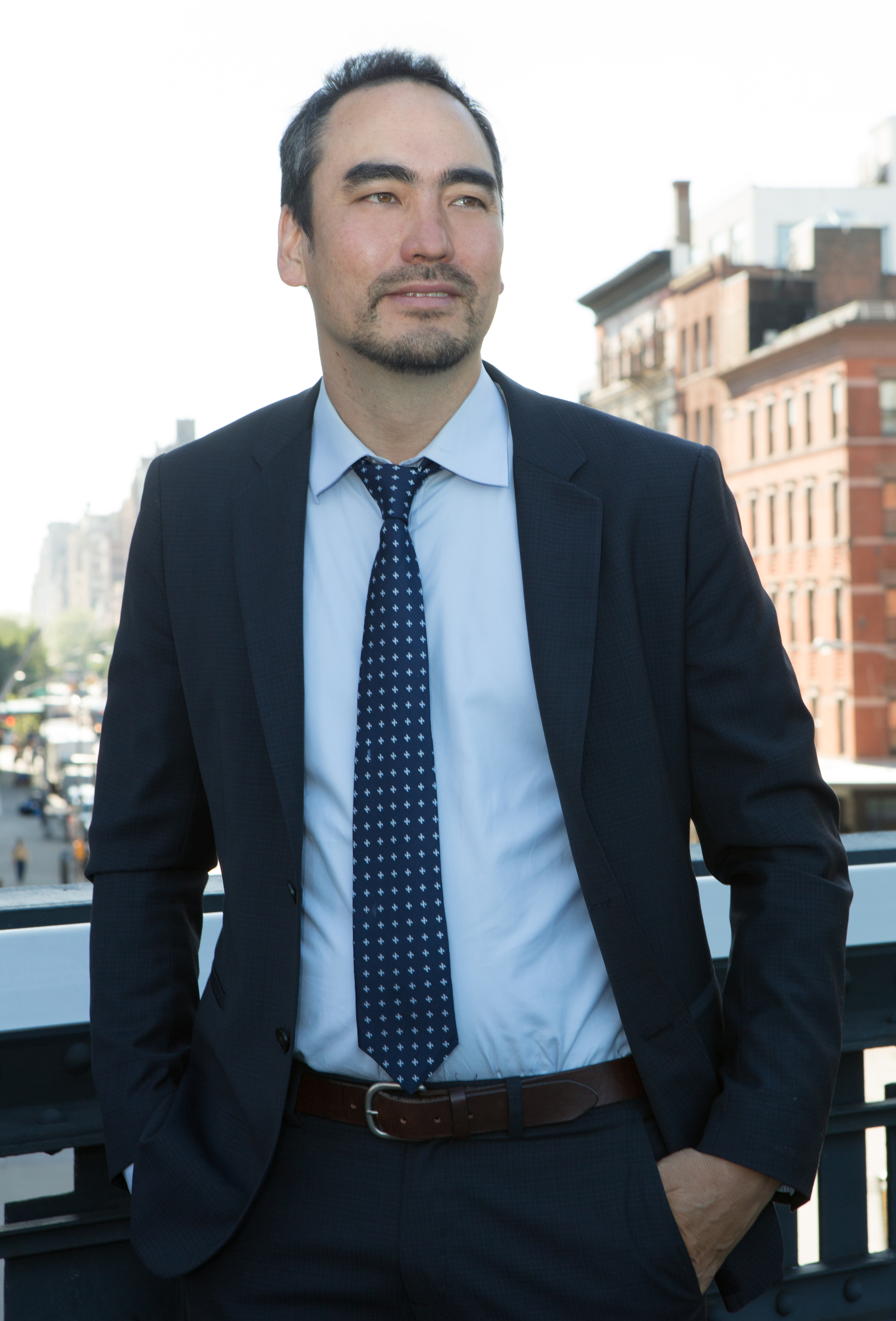
Wu at a campaign event

Wu ran for the Democratic nomination for Lieutenant Governor of New York in 2014, campaigning alongside gubernatorial candidate Zephyr Teachout. Wu and Teachout ran against Andrew Cuomo, the incumbent governor, and Kathy Hochul, an upstate Democrat and former Representative in the House. Teachout and Wu ran to the left of Cuomo and Hochul. Hochul won the race for Lieutenant Governor; Wu took 40% of the popular vote. Wu's campaign received an endorsement from The New York Times editorial board, although they offered no endorsement for the office of governor.

In a Washington Post interview discussing his candidacy, Wu described his approach to the campaign as one positioned against the concentration of private power: "A hundred years ago, antitrust and merger enforcement was front page news. And we live in another era of enormous private concentration. And for some reason we call all these 'wonky issues.' They're not, really. They affect people more than half a dozen other issues. Day to day, people's lives are affected by concentration and infrastructure... You can expect a progressive-style, trust-busting kind of campaign out of me. And I fully intend to bridge that gap between the kind of typical issues in electoral politics and questions involving private power."

In September 2015, The New York Times reported that Wu was appointed to a position in the Office of New York State Attorney General Eric Schneiderman. During the 2018 New York Attorney General election, Wu was mentioned as a possible candidate, though he ended up not mounting a bid.

=== Biden administration ===
Following Joe Biden's election as President of the United States, Wu had been mentioned as a possible appointee to the Federal Trade Commission, a body for which he has previously served as a senior advisor. On March 5, 2021, Wu confirmed a previous report that he would be joining the Biden administration's National Economic Council as a Special Assistant to the President for Technology and Competition Policy. As a member of the Biden administration, Wu was responsible for helping to author the antitrust-focused Executive Order 14036.

On August 2, 2022, Bloomberg News reported that Wu would leave the White House to return to his professorship at Columbia in the following months; however, Wu responded to the report by promising to not leave his position "anytime soon". On December 31, 2022, The New York Times reported that Mr. Wu's last day at the National Economic Council would be Wednesday, January 4, 2023, ending his 22-month tenure as special assistant to the Biden administration. Mr. Wu said he would return to his previous job, as a professor at Columbia Law School.

== Influence ==
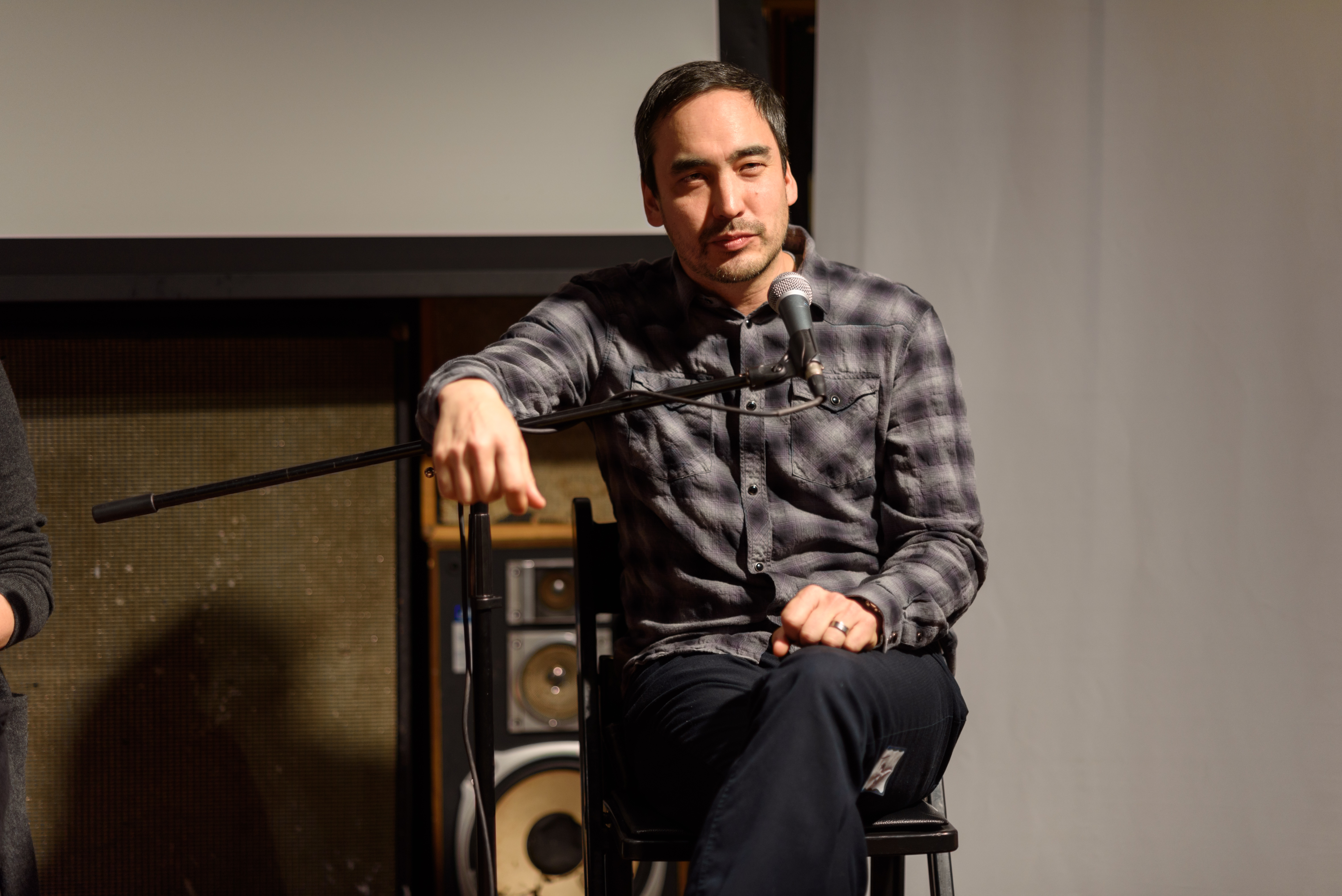
Wu spoke on a panel at Wikipedia Day 2017

Wu is credited with popularizing the concept of network neutrality in his 2003 paper Network Neutrality, Broadband Discrimination. The paper considered network neutrality in terms of neutrality between applications, as well as neutrality between data and quality of service-sensitive traffic, and he proposed some legislation, potentially, to deal with these issues.

In 2011, Wu joined the Federal Trade Commission as an academic in residence and Senior Policy Advisor, a position later held by Paul Ohm in 2012, and then by Andrea M. Matwyshyn in 2014. Wu has appeared on the television programs The Colbert Report and Charlie Rose. Wu has written about the phenomenon of attention theft, including in his 2016 book The Attention Merchants. Wu has been described as a leading member of the New Brandeis movement. His 2018 book, The Curse of Bigness: Antitrust in the New Gilded Age, analyzed the history and principles of antitrust enforcement in the United States and argued that increasing corporate consolidation presented threats not only to the U.S. economy but also to the American political system.

In 2026, Wu appeared at the Hay Festival on a panel about Big Tech with former Facebook executive Sarah Wynn-Williams and journalist Carole Cadwalladr; Wynn-Williams sat silently after lawyers advised her not to speak because of Meta legal action related to her memoir Careless People. Wu condemned the restrictions on Wynn-Williams’ participation as censorship.

== Personal life ==
Wu is married to Kathryn Judge, fellow Columbia law professor and lawyer. They have two daughters. Wu has won two Lowell Thomas Awards for travel journalism, and was on the Director's Advisory Group for the Sundance Film Festival in the late 2010s.

== Selected publications ==
=== Books ===
- Wu, Tim (2025). The Age of Extraction: How Tech Platforms Conquered the Economy and Threaten Our Future Prosperity. New York: Knopf (ISBN 978-0-593-32124-9).
- Wu, Tim (2018). The Curse of Bigness: Antitrust in the New Gilded Age. Columbia Global Reports (ISBN 978-0-9997454-6-5)
- Wu, Tim (2016). The Attention Merchants: The Epic Scramble to Get Inside Our Heads. New York: Knopf (ISBN 978-0-385-35201-7)
- Wu, Tim (2010). The Master Switch: The Rise and Fall of Information Empires. New York: Knopf (ISBN 0307269930, ISBN 978-0-307-26993-5)
- Goldsmith, Jack L., and Tim Wu (2006). Who Controls the Internet? Illusions of a Borderless World. New York: Oxford UP (ISBN 0195152662, ISBN 978-0-19-515266-1)

=== Articles ===
- Wu, T. (2019, December 11). Will artificial intelligence eat the law? the rise of hybrid social-ordering systems. Columbia Law Review. https://columbialawreview.org/content/will-artificial-intelligence-eat-the-law-the-rise-of-hybrid-social-ordering-systems/
- "A Historic Decision": Tim Wu, Father of Net Neutrality, Praises FCC Vote to Preserve Open Internet. Democracy Now!, February 27, 2015. Accessed October 20, 2015.
- (2013) "How the Legal System Failed Aaron Swartz—And Us", The New Yorker News Desk blog, January 14, 2013.
- (2007) "Wireless Net Neutrality: Cellular Carterfone and Consumer Choice in Mobile Broadband", New America Foundation: Wireless Future Program. Working Paper No. 17, Newamerica.net
- "Why You Should Care about Network Neutrality: The Future of the Internet Depends On It!". Slate, May 6, 2006. Accessed August 24, 2008.
- "Keeping Secrets: A Simple Prescription for Keeping Google's Records out of Government Hands". Slate, January 23, 2006. Accessed August 24, 2008.
- (2003) "Network Neutrality, Broadband Discrimination", 2 J. on Telecomm. & High Tech. L. 141 (2003).

== See also ==
- Kronos effect
- Chinese Americans in New York City
- Taiwanese Americans in New York City
- List of law clerks for the second seat of the Supreme Court of the United States

== Further reading and resources ==
=== Audiovisual resources ===
- Futures of the Internet (Viewable and downloadable Web Video clip) (Flash, MP3, MP4, RealVideo, WMV, 3GP, YouTube, etc.). New York Chapter of the Internet Society (ISOC–NY). 2008-04-16..
