= Bernhard Cinader =

Canadian immunologist

- Born: March 30, 1919; Austria
- Died: March 3, 2001 (aged 81); Toronto
- Citizenship: Canadian
- Education: University of London (Lister Institute of Preventative Medicine)
- Partner: Johanne Ratz
- Children: 1 (Agatha)
- Scientific career
- Fields: Immunology
- Workplaces: University of Toronto; Lister Institute of Preventive Medicine; Babraham Institute; Princess Margaret Hospital (Toronto); Ontario Cancer Institute
- Thesis: The interaction of some problems in tetanus toxin and antitoxin. (1948)

Bernhard "Hardi" Cinader OC (March 30, 1919 – March 3, 2001) was a Canadian Immunologist and Professor in the Department of Immunology at the University of Toronto. He was inaugural president of the Canadian Society for Immunology (1966-1969) and the International Union of Immunological Societies (1969-1974).

== Scientific career ==
Cinader obtained his PhD from the University of London at the Lister Institute of Preventive Medicine in London, England in 1948 and continued to conduct research there until 1958.

He was recruited to Toronto, Canada as head of the immunochemistry subdivision of the Ontario Cancer Institute in 1958. He is considered one of the founders of Immunology research in Canada.

He was founding director of the Institute of Immunology in the Department of Biochemistry at the University of Toronto.

Cinader was founding president (1966-1969) of the Canadian Society for Immunology.

The Canadian Society for Immunology initiated the annual Berhard Cinader Award in 1987.

== Research ==
In England, Cinader studied the antigenic properties of tetanus, streptolysin and albumin with particular interest in enzyme-antibody interactions.

At the Ontario Cancer Institute, his studies turned to tolerance, complement and aging.

== Personal life ==
Cinader was a patron of native Canadian art and artists.
