= Mitt Romney =

American politician and businessman (born 1947)

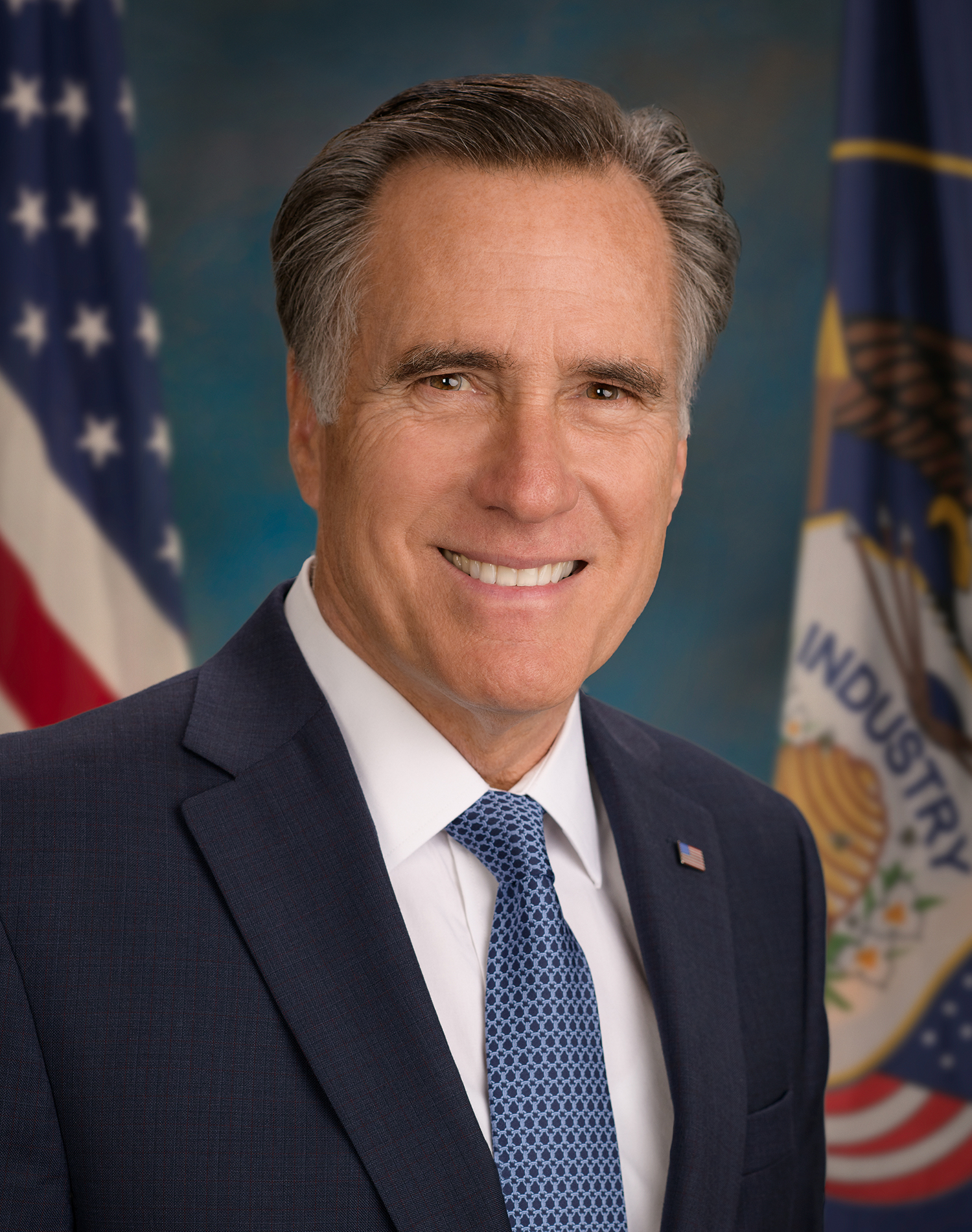
- Official portrait, 2019

United States Senator from Utah
- In office January 3, 2019 – January 3, 2025
- Preceded by: Orrin Hatch
- Succeeded by: John Curtis

70th Governor of Massachusetts
- In office January 2, 2003 – January 4, 2007
- Lieutenant: Kerry Healey
- Preceded by: Jane Swift (acting)
- Succeeded by: Deval Patrick

President of the Salt Lake Organizing Committee for the Olympic and Paralympic Winter Games of 2002
- In office February 12, 1999 – August 2002
- President: Juan Antonio Samaranch; Jacques Rogge
- Preceded by: James L. Easton
- Succeeded by: Valentino Castellani

Personal details
- Born: Willard Mitt Romney; March 12, 1947 (age 79) Detroit, Michigan, U.S.
- Party: Republican (since 1993)
- Other political affiliations: Independent (before 1993)
- Spouse: Ann Davies (m. 1969)
- Children: 5, including Tagg
- Parents: George W. Romney; Lenore LaFount Romney
- Relatives: Romney family
- Education: Stanford University (attended); Brigham Young University (BA); Harvard University (JD, MBA)
- Romney's voice Romney on objections to certifying the electoral results following the January 6 Capitol attack Recorded January 6, 2021

Willard Mitt Romney (born March 12, 1947) is an American businessman and retired politician who served as a United States senator from Utah from 2019 to 2025 and as the 70th governor of Massachusetts from 2003 to 2007. A member of the Republican Party, he was the party's nominee in the 2012 presidential election.

The youngest child of former Michigan governor and U.S. Housing and Urban Development Secretary George W. Romney, Romney served as a missionary in France for the Church of Jesus Christ of Latter-day Saints (LDS Church). After earning joint JD–MBA degrees from Harvard University in 1975, Romney moved to Boston and joined Bain & Company in 1977, later becoming its chief executive officer. In 1984 he co-founded Bain Capital, which grew into one of the nation's largest private equity firms.

Romney ran as the Republican nominee in the 1994 United States Senate election in Massachusetts, losing to Democratic incumbent Ted Kennedy. Subsequently, he resumed his position at Bain Capital and later moved to Utah, where a successful stint as president and CEO of the then-struggling 2002 Winter Olympics led to the relaunch of Romney's political career. He subsequently won the 2002 Massachusetts gubernatorial election. As governor, Romney helped develop and later signed a health care reform law (commonly referred to as "Romneycare") that provided near-universal health insurance access and presided over the prevention of a projected $1.2–1.5 billion deficit through a combination of spending cuts and the cessation of corporate tax loopholes.

Romney did not seek reelection as governor in 2006 and instead sought the 2008 Republican presidential nomination, which he lost to Senator John McCain. He won the nomination for the next presidential election, choosing Paul Ryan as his running mate. He lost the general election to incumbent President Barack Obama. After reestablishing residency in Utah, Romney successfully ran for the U.S. Senate in 2018, becoming the first person in modern U.S. history to be elected governor and U.S. senator of different states.

During his term in the Senate, he marched alongside Black Lives Matter protesters, voted to confirm Ketanji Brown Jackson to the U.S. Supreme Court, supported gun control measures, and became the first senator in U.S. history to vote to convict a president of his own party in an impeachment trial when he voted to convict Donald Trump during his first impeachment trial in 2020; he also voted to convict in Trump's second trial in 2021. He has long been hawkish on relations with Iran, China, and Russia, and is a staunch supporter of Israel and Ukraine. In 2023, he announced he would not seek reelection and retired from the Senate when his term expired in 2025.

== Early and personal life ==
=== Heritage and youth ===
Willard Mitt Romney was born on March 12, 1947, at Harper University Hospital in Detroit, Michigan, one of four children of automobile executive George W. Romney and actress and homemaker Lenore Romney (née LaFount). His mother was from Logan, Utah, and his father was born to American parents in a Mormon colony in Chihuahua, Mexico. A fifth-generation member of the LDS Church, he is a great-grandson of Miles Park Romney and a great-great-grandson of Miles Romney, who converted to Mormonism in its first decade. Another great-great-grandfather, Parley P. Pratt, helped lead the early church.

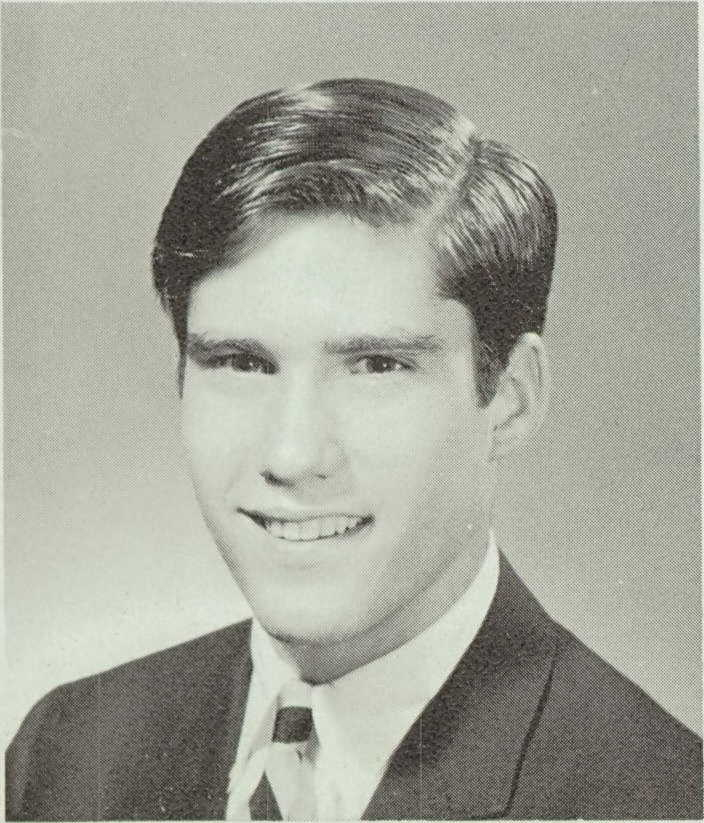
Romney in Cranbrook School's 1965 yearbook

Romney has three older siblings: Margo, Jane, and Scott. He was named after a family friend, businessman J. Willard Marriott, and his father's cousin, Milton "Mitt" Romney. Romney was called "Billy" until kindergarten, when he expressed a preference for "Mitt". In 1953, the family moved from Detroit to the affluent suburb of Bloomfield Hills and his father became the chairman and CEO of American Motors the following year and helped the company return to profitability. By 1959, his father had become a nationally known figure, and Mitt idolized him.

Romney attended public elementary schools until seventh grade, when he enrolled as one of only a few Mormon students at Cranbrook School, a private upscale boys' preparatory school. Many students there came from backgrounds even more privileged than his. While not particularly athletic, he also did not distinguish himself academically. He participated in his father's successful 1962 gubernatorial campaign, and later worked as an intern in the governor's office. Romney took up residence at Cranbrook when his newly elected father began spending most of his time at the state capitol.

At Cranbrook, Romney helped manage the ice hockey team, and joined the pep squad. During his senior year, he joined the cross country running team. He belonged to 11 school organizations and school clubs, including the Blue Key Club, a booster group he had started. Romney was involved in several pranks while attending Cranbrook. He has since apologized for them, stating that some of them may have gone too far. (Note: Pranks conducted by Romney during his Cranbrook years included sliding down golf courses on large ice cubes, dressing as a police officer and tapping on the car windows of friends who were making out, and staging an elaborate formal dinner on the median of a busy street. The golf course escapade led to Romney and Ann Davies being detained by local police. In 2012, five former classmates described a 1965 episode where Romney, then a senior, took the lead in holding down a younger student while cutting his long, bleached-blond hair with scissors. Romney said that he does not recall the incident, though he acknowledged that he might have participated in some high school "hijinks and pranks" that went too far, and he apologized for any harm that resulted from them.) In March of his senior year, he began dating Ann Davies. The two became informally engaged around the time he graduated from high school in June 1965.

=== College, France mission, marriage, and children ===
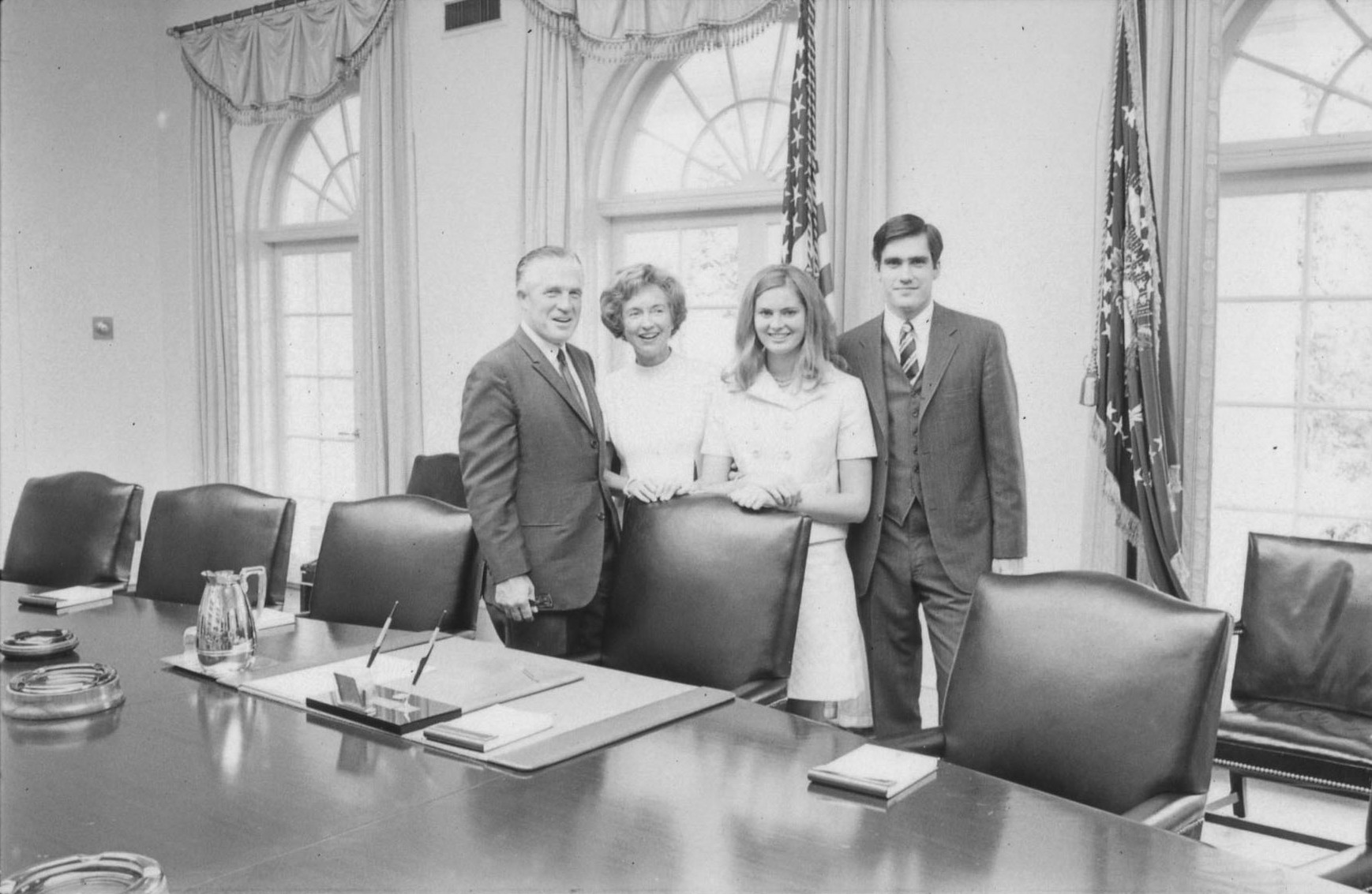
Romney and his wife Ann with his parents George W. Romney and Lenore Romney at the Cabinet Room of the White House, 1969

Romney attended Stanford University during the 1965–66 academic year but was largely removed from the emerging counterculture of the 1960s. Romney joined a counterprotest against a sit-in at Stanford's administration building, itself opposing draft status tests in 1966. He continued to enjoy occasional pranks. (Note: Pranks conducted by Romney during his Stanford years included dressing as a police officer and pretending to arrest people and pre-"Big Game" customs involving the Stanford Axe.)

In July 1966, he began a 30-month stint in France as an LDS Church missionary, a traditional rite of passage in his family. (Note: Mitt's great-grandfather, grandfather, father, and two uncles had been missionaries, as had his brother, Scott. He did briefly consider breaking with tradition and not going on a mission, but did go, and all five of Mitt's sons later served as missionaries as well.) Living under strict missionary rules and modest conditions, Romney found the work challenging and later recalled periods of discouragement as many of his efforts were rejected. He initially became demoralized and later recalled it as the only time when "most of what I was trying to do was rejected." He later estimated 10 to 20 converts for his entire mission.

Despite these difficulties, Romney rose steadily through the mission's leadership ranks. He became a zone leader in Bordeaux and later an assistant to the mission president in Paris. He frequently debated French critics of American involvement in the Vietnam War, and their opposition often strengthened his resolve. In June 1968, Romney was seriously injured in an automobile accident that killed the wife of the mission president. (Note: On June 16, 1968, Romney and five fellow Mormons were traveling on dangerous roads in southern France. As they drove through the village of Bernos-Beaulac, a Mercedes that was passing a truck missed a curve and swerved into the opposite lane hitting the Citroën DS Romney was driving head-on. Trapped between the steering wheel and door, the unconscious Romney had to be pried from the car; a French police officer mistakenly wrote Il est mort in his passport. Besides killing the wife of the mission president, the other four passengers were seriously injured. George Romney relied on his friend Sargent Shriver, the U.S. Ambassador to France, to go to the local hospital and discover that his son had survived. Mitt Romney, who was not at fault in the accident, had suffered broken ribs, a fractured arm, a concussion, and facial injuries, but recovered quickly without needing surgery. The French police say that they have no records of the incident because such records are routinely destroyed after 10 years.) After the unrest caused by the May 1968 general strike and student uprisings, he helped restore morale and organization within the mission. By the end of his service in December 1968, he was overseeing 175 missionaries, had helped the mission achieve its highest annual baptism total in a decade, and had developed a lifelong affection for France and its people while becoming fluent in French.

Upon returning to the United States, Romney reunited with Ann Davies, and the two decided to marry. They wed in March 1969 and settled in Utah; Romney enrolled at Brigham Young University (BYU), where Ann had been studying. Having missed much of the anti-Vietnam War movement while abroad, Romney expressed the view that American involvement in Vietnam had been misguided, though he supported the Cambodian Incursion by the administration of Richard Nixon as a sincere attempt to end the war. During the military draft for the war, Romney sought and received two student deferments, then a ministerial deferment while living in France. He later sought and received two additional student deferments. When those ran out, he drew number 300 in the December 1969 draft lottery, ensuring he would not be drafted.

At culturally conservative BYU, Romney remained separated from much of the upheaval of the era,, became president of the Cougar Club booster organization, and excelled academically. He also took a leave of absence during his senior year to serve as a driver and advance man for the unsuccessful U.S. Senate campaign of his mother. Romney graduated in 1971 with a Bachelor of Arts degree in English, a 3.97 GPA, and the distinction of delivering commencement addresses to both his college and the university as a whole. (Note: Some sources incorrectly report that Romney graduated first in his class at BYU. Romney himself has corrected this notion, saying that he didn't. While Romney believes he did have the highest grade point average for his on-campus BYU years in the College of Humanities, he did not if his Stanford record was factored in.)

The Romneys' first son, Taggart, was born in 1970 while they were undergraduates at BYU and living in a basement apartment. Their son Matthew was born in 1971 and Joshua in 1975. Benjamin (1978) and Craig (1981) were born after Romney had begun his career. Intending to pursue a business career, he followed his father's advice that legal training would be valuable and enrolled in the joint Juris Doctor and Master of Business Administration program offered by Harvard Law School and Harvard Business School.

Living in Belmont, Massachusetts, with Ann and their children, Romney focused on academics rather than politics and adapted readily to the business school's case-study method. He graduated in 1975 as a Baker Scholar for placing in the top 5 percent of his business school class. He also earned his Juris Doctor degree cum laude.

=== LDS Church service ===
During his business career, Romney held several positions in the church's local lay clergy. In the early 1970s, he served in a ward bishopric. He then served for a time as a seminary teacher and then as a member of the high council of the Boston stake while Richard L. Bushman was stake president.

In 1977, he became a counselor to the president of the Boston Stake. He served as bishop of the ward at Belmont, Massachusetts, from 1981 to 1986. As such, in addition to home teaching, he also formulated Sunday services and classes using LDS scriptures to guide the congregation. After the destruction of the Belmont meetinghouse by a fire of suspicious origins in 1984, he forged links with other religious institutions, allowing the congregation to rotate its meetings to other houses of worship during the reconstruction of the Belmont building.

From 1986 to 1994, Romney was president of the Boston Stake, which included more than a dozen wards in eastern Massachusetts and almost 4,000 church members. He organized a team to handle financial and management issues, sought to counter anti-Mormon sentiment, and tried to solve social problems among poor Southeast Asian converts. An unpaid position, his local church leadership often took 30 or more hours a week of his time, and he became known for his considerable energy in the role. He also earned a reputation for avoiding any overnight travel that might interfere with his church responsibilities.

Romney took a hands-on role in the Boston Stake's matters, helping in domestic maintenance efforts, visiting the sick, and counseling burdened church members. A number of local church members later credited him with turning their lives around or helping them through difficult times. Others, rankled by his leadership style, desired a more consensus-based approach. Romney tried to balance the conservative directives from church leadership in Utah with the desire of some Massachusetts members to have a more flexible application of religious doctrine. He agreed with some requests from a liberal women's group that published Exponent II calling for changes in the way the church dealt with women, but he clashed with women he felt were departing too much from doctrine. In particular, he counseled women not to have abortions except in the rare cases allowed by LDS doctrine (Note: Romney's cited exceptions regarding abortion are in line with those of the LDS Church, which allows it in cases of rape, incest, when the mother's health is seriously threatened, or when the fetus cannot survive past birth. When Romney was a bishop in the 1980s, there was a case where a woman in his congregation with four children was advised by her doctor to terminate her pregnancy because she had a potentially life-threatening blood clot. Romney strongly advised her not to, but she did anyway.) and encouraged unmarried women facing unplanned pregnancies to give their babies up for adoption. Romney later said that the years spent as an LDS minister gave him direct exposure to people struggling financially and empathy for those with family problems.

=== Health ===
Romney was treated for prostate cancer in the summer of 2017. In 2024, Romney admitted he was worried about being at risk of Alzheimer's disease due to years of working in high-stress jobs.

== Business career ==
=== Management consulting ===
After receiving his JD–MBA from Harvard, Romney passed the Michigan bar exam but decided to pursue a career in business rather than law. He was recruited by several large companies but joined the Boston Consulting Group (BCG), reasoning that working as a management consultant for a variety of companies would better prepare him for a future position as a chief executive. Part of a 1970s wave of top graduates who chose to go into consulting rather than join a large company directly, he found his legal and business education useful in his job. He applied BCG principles such as the growth-share matrix, and executives viewed him as having a bright future there. At BCG, he was a colleague of Benjamin Netanyahu, with whom he formed a friendship that has lasted for more than 50 years.

In 1977, he was hired by Bain & Company, a management consulting firm in Boston formed a few years earlier by Bill Bain and several other ex-BCG employees. Bain later said of the 30-year-old Romney, "He had the appearance of confidence of a guy who was maybe ten years older." Unlike other consulting firms, which issued recommendations and then departed, Bain & Company immersed itself in a client's businesses and worked with them until changes were implemented. Romney became a vice president of the firm in 1978, working with such clients as the Monsanto Company, Outboard Marine Corporation, Burlington Industries, and Corning Incorporated. Within a few years, the firm considered him one of its best consultants. In fact, clients sometimes preferred to use him rather than more-senior partners.

Two family incidents during this time later surfaced during Romney's political campaigns. A state park ranger in 1981 told Romney his motorboat had an insufficiently visible license number and that he would face a $50 fine if he took the boat onto the lake. Disagreeing about the license and wanting to continue a family outing, Romney took it out anyway, saying he would pay the fine. The ranger arrested him for disorderly conduct. The charges were dropped several days later. In 1983, on a 12-hour family road trip, he placed the family's dog in a windshield-equipped carrier on the roof of their car, and then washed the car and carrier after the dog suffered a bout of diarrhea. The dog incident in particular later became fodder for Romney's critics and political opponents.

=== Private equity ===
In 1984, Romney left Bain & Company to co-found and lead the spin-off private equity investment firm Bain Capital. He initially refrained from accepting Bill Bain's offer to head the new venture until Bain rearranged the terms in a complicated partnership structure so that there was no financial or professional risk to Romney. Bain and Romney raised the $37 million needed to start the new operation, which had seven employees. Romney held the titles of president and managing general partner. Though he was the sole shareholder of the firm, publications also called him managing director or CEO.

Initially, Bain Capital focused on venture capital investments. Romney set up a system in which any partner could veto one of these potential opportunities, and he personally saw so many weaknesses that few venture capital investments were approved in the initial two years. The firm's first significant success was a 1986 investment to help start Staples Inc., after founder Thomas G. Stemberg convinced Romney of the market size for office supplies and Romney convinced others; Bain Capital eventually reaped a nearly sevenfold return on its investment, and Romney sat on Staples's board of directors for over a decade.

Romney soon switched Bain Capital's focus from startups to the relatively new business of leveraged buyouts: buying existing companies with money mostly borrowed from banking institutions using the newly bought companies' assets as collateral, taking steps to improve the companies' value, and then selling those companies when their value peaked, usually within a few years. Bain Capital lost money in many of its early leveraged buyouts, but then found deals that made large returns. The firm invested in or acquired Accuride Corporation, Brookstone, Domino's Pizza, Sealy Corporation, Sports Authority, and Artisan Entertainment, as well as some lesser-known companies in the industrial and medical sectors. Much of the firm's profit was earned from a relatively small number of deals; Bain Capital's overall success-to-failure ratio was about even. (Note: One study of 68 deals that Bain Capital made during Romney's time there found that the firm lost money or broke even on 33 of them. Another study that looked at the eight-year period following 77 deals during Romney's time found that in 17 cases the company went bankrupt or out of business, and in 6 cases Bain Capital lost all its investment. But 10 deals were very successful and represented 70 percent of the total profits.)

Romney discovered few investment opportunities himself (and those that he did often failed to make money for the firm). Instead, he focused on analyzing the merits of possible deals that others brought forward and on recruiting investors to participate in them once approved. At Bain Capital, Romney spread profits from deals widely within the firm to keep people motivated, often keeping less than 10% for himself. Data-driven, he often played the role of a devil's advocate during exhaustive analysis of whether to go forward with a deal. He wanted to drop a Bain Capital hedge fund that initially lost money, but other partners disagreed with him and it eventually made billions. He opted out of the Artisan Entertainment deal, not wanting to profit from a studio that produced R-rated films. Romney served on the board of directors of Damon Corporation, a medical testing company later found guilty of defrauding the government; Bain Capital tripled its investment before selling off the company, and the fraud was discovered by the new owners (Romney was never implicated). In some cases, Romney had little involvement with a company once Bain Capital acquired it.

Bain Capital's leveraged buyouts sometimes led to layoffs, either soon after acquisition or later after the firm had concluded its role. Exactly how many jobs Bain Capital added compared to those lost because of these investments and buyouts is unknown, owing to a lack of records and Bain Capital's penchant for privacy for itself and its investors. Maximizing the value of acquired companies and the return to Bain's investors, not job creation, was the firm's primary investment goal. Bain Capital's acquisition of Ampad exemplified a deal where it profited handsomely from early payments and management fees, even though the subject company itself later went into bankruptcy. Dade Behring was another case where Bain Capital received an eightfold return on its investment but the company itself was saddled with debt and laid off over a thousand employees before Bain Capital exited (the company subsequently went into bankruptcy, with more layoffs, before recovering and prospering). Referring to the layoffs that sometimes occurred, Romney said in 2007: "Sometimes the medicine is a little bitter but it is necessary to save the life of the patient. My job was to try and make the enterprise successful, and in my view the best security a family can have is that the business they work for is strong."

In 1990, facing financial collapse, Bain & Company asked Romney to return. Announced as its new CEO in January 1991, he drew a symbolic salary of one dollar (remaining managing general partner of Bain Capital during this time). He oversaw an effort to restructure Bain & Company's employee stock-ownership plan and real-estate deals, while rallying the firm's 1,000 employees, imposing a new governing structure that excluded Bain and the other founding partners from control, and increasing fiscal transparency. He got Bain and other initial owners who had removed excessive amounts of money from the firm to return substantial amounts, and persuaded creditors, including the Federal Deposit Insurance Corporation, to accept less than full payment. Within about a year, he led Bain & Company to a return to profitability. He then turned it over to new leadership and returned to Bain Capital in December 1992.

Romney took a leave of absence from Bain Capital from November 1993 to November 1994 to run for U.S. Senate. During that time, Ampad workers went on strike and asked Romney to intervene. Against the advice of Bain Capital lawyers, Romney met the strikers, but told them he had no position of active authority in the matter.

By 1999, Bain Capital was on its way to becoming one of the foremost private equity firms in the nation, having increased its number of partners from 5 to 18, with 115 employees and $4 billion under management. The firm's average annual internal rate of return on realized investments was 113% and its average yearly return to investors was around 50–80%.

Starting in February 1999, Romney took a paid leave of absence from Bain Capital in order to serve as the president and CEO of the 2002 Salt Lake City Olympic Games Organizing Committee. Billed in some public statements as keeping a part-time role, Romney remained the firm's sole shareholder, managing director, CEO, and president, signing corporate and legal documents, attending to his interests within the firm, and conducting prolonged negotiations for the terms of his departure. He did not involve himself in the firm's day-to-day operations or the investment decisions of its new private equity funds. He retained his position on several boards of directors during this time and regularly returned to Massachusetts to attend meetings.

In August 2001, Romney announced that he would not return to Bain Capital. His separation from the firm concluded in early 2002; he transferred his ownership to other partners and negotiated an agreement that allowed him to receive a share of the profits as a retired partner in some Bain Capital entities, including buyout and investment funds. The private equity business continued to thrive, earning him millions of dollars in annual income.

=== 1994 U.S. Senate campaign in Massachusetts ===
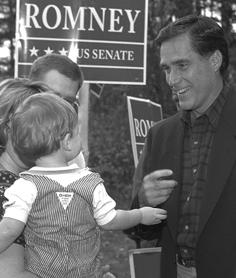
Campaigning for U.S. Senate in Holyoke, Massachusetts, 1994

For much of his business career, Romney did not take public political stances. He had kept abreast of national politics since college, and the circumstances of his father's presidential campaign loss had irked him for decades. He remained an Independent and voted for Massachusetts Democrat Paul Tsongas in the 1992 presidential primaries.

By 1993, encouraged by his wife Ann and inspired by his father's political career, he began considering a run for office. Seeing an opportunity to challenge longtime Democratic U.S. senator Ted Kennedy, in part due to the unpopular Democratic congress and the recent William Kennedy Smith trial in which Kennedy's reputation had suffered. Romney switched to the Republican Party in October 1993 and announced his candidacy in February 1994, taking leave from Bain Capital and stepping down from his church leadership role.

Romney quickly emerged as the strongest Republican candidate, winning the party convention and primary against John Lakian by large margins. In the general election, he presented himself as a successful businessman and political outsider who had created jobs and supported moderate positions on social issues. The race became the most competitive of Kennedy's career, with polls showing the candidates essentially tied by September. However, Kennedy effectively highlighted Romney's shifting positions on issues such as abortion and criticized Bain Capital's role in layoffs at an Ampad plant, blunting Romney's momentum.

Kennedy and Romney held a widely watched late October debate that had no clear winner, but by then, Kennedy had pulled ahead in polls and remained so. Romney spent $3 million of his own money on the race and more than $7 million overall. (Note: Kennedy spent $10.5 million overall, including a $1.5 million loan to himself. This was the second-most expensive race of the 1994 election cycle, after the U.S. Senate race in California.) Despite a disastrous showing for Democrats nationwide, Kennedy won the election with 58% of the vote to Romney's 41%, the smallest margin in any of Kennedy's reelection campaigns for the Senate.

The day after the election, Romney returned to Bain Capital, but the loss had a lasting effect; he told his brother, "I never want to run for something again unless I can win." When his father died in 1995, Mitt donated his inheritance to BYU's George W. Romney Institute of Public Management. He also became vice-chair of the board of the Points of Light Foundation, which had embraced his father's National Volunteer Center. Romney felt restless as the decade neared a close; making more money held little attraction for him. Although no longer in a local leadership position in his church, he still taught Sunday School. During the long and controversial approval and construction process for the $30-million Mormon temple in Belmont, he feared that, as a political figure who had opposed Kennedy, he would become a focal point for opposition to the structure. He thus kept to a limited, behind-the-scenes role in attempts to ease tensions between the church and local residents.

=== 2002 Winter Olympics ===
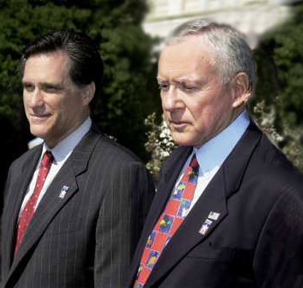
Romney with Orrin Hatch at a press conference on Olympic security in October 2001

In 1998, Ann Romney learned that she had multiple sclerosis; Mitt described watching her fail a series of neurological tests as the worst day of his life. After experiencing two years of severe difficulties with the disease, she found – while living in Park City, Utah, where the couple had built a vacation home – a combination of mainstream, alternative, and equestrian therapies that enabled her to lead a lifestyle mostly without limitations. When her husband received a job offer to take over the troubled organization responsible for the 2002 Winter Olympics and Paralympics, to be held in Salt Lake City in Utah, she urged him to accept it; eager for a new challenge, as well as another chance to prove himself in public life, he did. On February 11, 1999, the Salt Lake Organizing Committee for the Olympic and Paralympic Winter Games of 2002 hired Romney as its president and CEO.

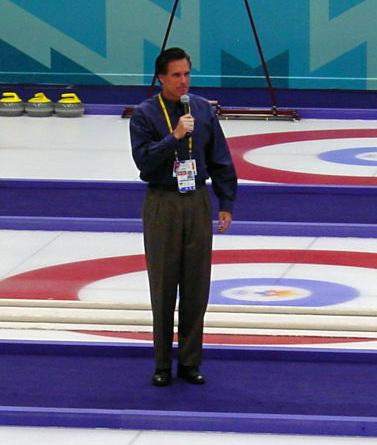
Romney, as president and CEO of the Salt Lake Organizing Committee for the 2002 Winter Olympics, speaking before a curling match

Before Romney took over, the event was $379 million short of its revenue goals. Officials had made plans to scale back the Games to compensate for the fiscal crisis, and there were fears it might be moved away entirely. In addition, the Games' image had been damaged by allegations of bribery against top officials including prior committee president and CEO Frank Joklik. The Salt Lake Organizing Committee forced Joklik and committee vice president Dave Johnson to resign. Utah power brokers, including Governor Mike Leavitt, searched for someone with a scandal-free reputation to take charge of the Olympics. They chose Romney based on his business and legal expertise as well as his connections to both the LDS Church and the state. The appointment faced some initial criticism from both non-Mormons and Mormons that it represented cronyism and made the Games seem too Mormon-dominated. Romney donated to charity the $1.4 million in salary and severance payments he received for his three years as president and CEO, and also donated $1 million to the Olympics.

Romney restructured the organization's leadership and policies. He reduced budgets and boosted fundraising, alleviating corporate sponsors' concerns while recruiting new ones. Romney worked to ensure the Games's safety after the September 11 attacks by coordinating a $300 million security budget. He oversaw a $1.32 billion budget, 700 employees, and 26,000 volunteers. The federal government provided approximately $400 million to $600 million of that budget, much of it a result of Romney's having aggressively lobbied Congress and federal agencies. It was a record level of federal funding for the staging of a U.S. Olympics. An additional $1.1 billion of indirect federal funding came to the state in the form of highway and transit projects.

Romney emerged as the local public face of the Olympic effort, appearing in photographs, in news stories, on collectible Olympics pins depicting him wrapped by an American flag, and on buttons carrying phrases like "Hey, Mitt, we love you!" Organizing committee chair Robert H. Garff later said, "It was obvious that he had an agenda larger than just the Olympics", and that Romney wanted to use the Olympics to propel himself into the national spotlight and a political career. Garff believed the initial budget situation was not as bad as Romney portrayed, given there were still three years to reorganize. Utah senator Bob Bennett said that much of the needed federal money was already in place. A Boston Globe analysis later found that the committee had nearly $1 billion in committed revenues at that time. Olympics critic Steve Pace, who led Utahns for Responsible Public Spending, thought Romney exaggerated the initial fiscal state to lay the groundwork for a well-publicized rescue. Kenneth Bullock, another board member of the organizing committee and also head of the Utah League of Cities and Towns, often clashed with Romney at the time, and later said that Romney deserved some credit for the turnaround but not as much as he claimed. Bullock said: "He tried very hard to build an image of himself as a savior, the great white hope. He was very good at characterizing and castigating people and putting himself on a pedestal."

Despite the initial fiscal shortfall, the Games ended up with a surplus of $100 million. President George W. Bush praised Romney's efforts and 87% of Utahns approved of his performance as Olympics head. It solidified his reputation as a "turnaround artist", and Harvard Business School taught a case study based around his actions. U.S. Olympic Committee head William Hybl credited Romney with an extraordinary effort in overcoming a difficult time for the Olympics, culminating in "the greatest Winter Games I have ever seen". Romney wrote a book about his experience, Turnaround: Crisis, Leadership, and the Olympic Games, published in 2004. The role gave him experience in dealing with federal, state, and local entities, a public persona he had previously lacked, and the chance to relaunch his political aspirations.

== Governor of Massachusetts (2003–2007) ==
=== Election ===
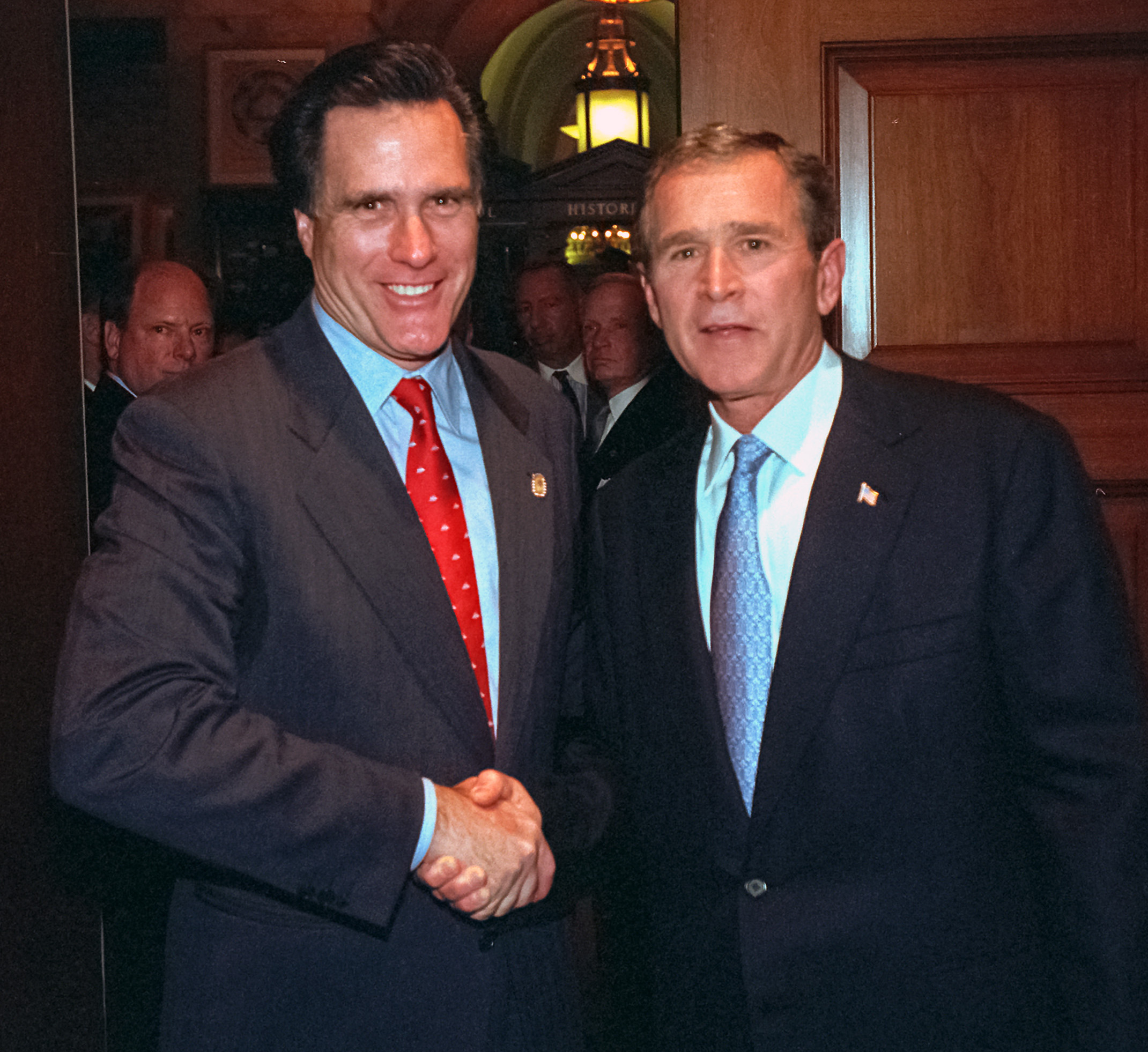
Romney with President George W. Bush in 2002

In 2002, the administration of acting Massachusetts governor Jane Swift was weakened by political missteps and personal scandals, leading many Republicans to doubt her ability to win reelection. Party leaders and the White House encouraged Romney to run for governor, attracted by his high profile and perceived electability. After Swift announced on March 19, 2002, that she would not seek the Republican nomination, Romney entered the race and faced no primary opposition. Democrats challenged his eligibility, arguing that he had not met Massachusetts' seven-year residency requirement, but the bipartisan State Ballot Law Commission unanimously ruled that he had maintained sufficient ties to the state to qualify.

Romney again ran as a political outsider and moderate Republican, emphasizing his private sector experience and Olympics record as evidence of his ability to address Massachusetts' fiscal challenges. His campaign employed innovative microtargeting techniques and sought to soften his corporate image through staged "work days", in which Romney performed blue-collar jobs such as herding cows and baling hay, unloading a fishing boat, and hauling garbage. Although the Democratic nominee, Massachusetts State Treasurer Shannon O'Brien, led in the polls late in the race, Romney regained momentum with advertisements criticizing her record and economic stewardship, and associating her husband with the Enron scandal. He contributed more than $6 million of his own money to a campaign that raised nearly $10 million and won the November 5, 2002, election with 50 percent of the vote to O'Brien's 45 percent.

=== Tenure ===
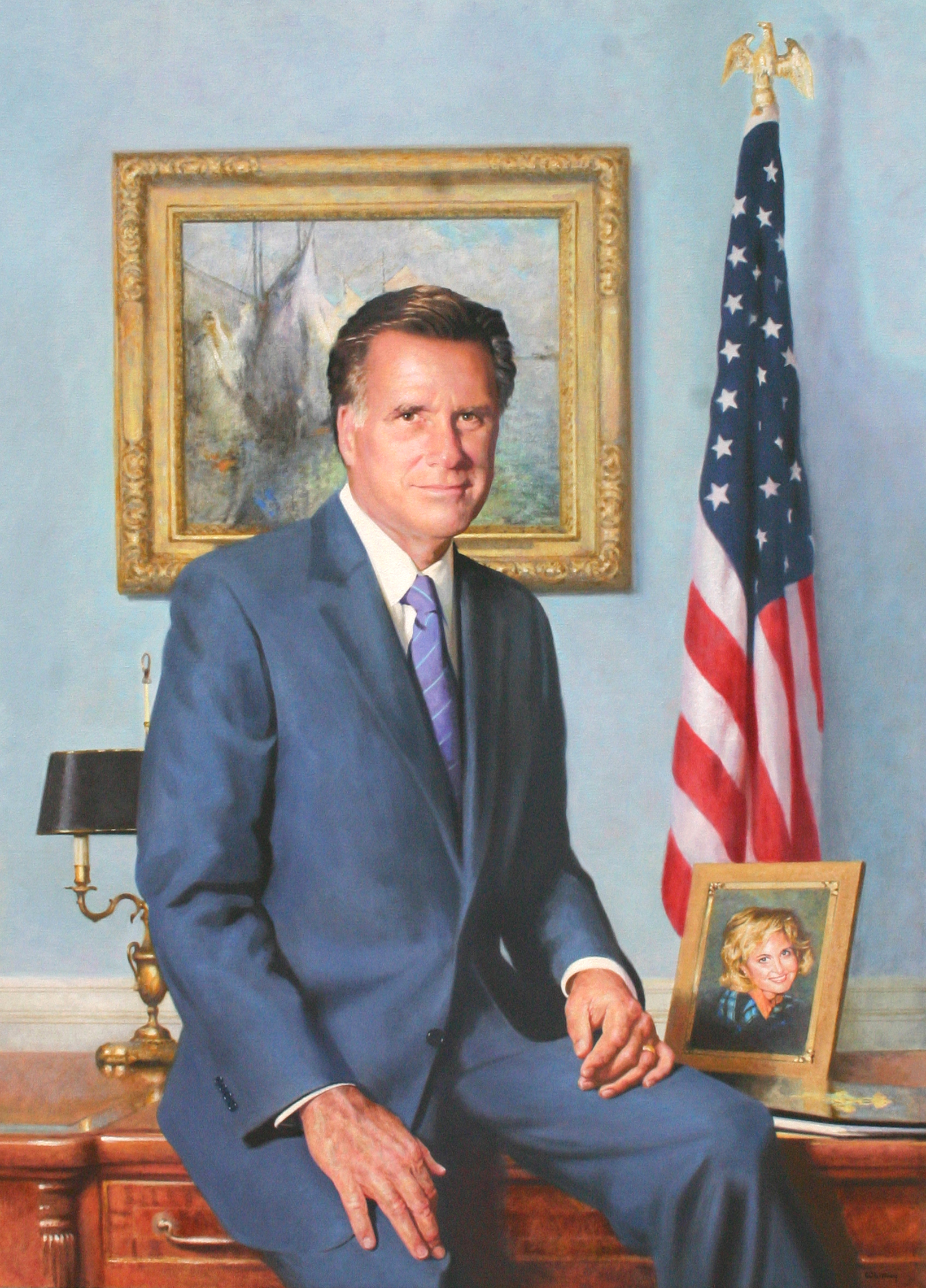
Massachusetts State House portrait by Richard Whitney

Romney was sworn in as the 70th governor of Massachusetts on January 2, 2003. He faced a Massachusetts state legislature with large Democratic majorities in both houses, and had picked his cabinet and advisors based more on managerial abilities than partisan affiliation. He declined a governor's salary of $135,000 during his term. Upon entering office in the middle of a fiscal year, he faced an immediate $650 million shortfall and a projected $3 billion deficit for the next year. Unexpected revenue of $1.0–1.3 billion from a previously enacted capital gains tax increase and $500 million in new federal grants decreased the deficit to $1.2–1.5 billion. Through a combination of spending cuts, increased fees, and removal of corporate tax loopholes, the state achieved surpluses of around $600–700 million during Romney's last two full fiscal years in office, although it began running deficits again after that. (Note: Official state figures for fiscal year 2005 (July 1, 2004 – June 30, 2005) declared a $594.4 million surplus. For fiscal 2006, the surplus was $720.9 million. During fiscal 2007, Romney cut $384 million in spending that the legislature wanted; in January 2007, midway through the fiscal year, incoming Governor Deval Patrick restored that amount, and also declared that the state faced a "looming budget shortfall" of $1 billion for fiscal 2008. Patrick consequently proposed a budget for fiscal 2008 that included $515 million in spending cuts and $295 million in new corporate taxes. As it happened, the state ended fiscal 2007 with a $307.1 million deficit and fiscal 2008 with a $495.2 million deficit.)

Romney supported raising various fees, including those for drivers' licenses and gun licenses, to raise more than $300 million. He increased a special gasoline retailer fee by $0.02 per US gallon ($0.0053/L), generating about $60 million per year in additional revenue. Opponents said the reliance on fees sometimes imposed a hardship on those who could least afford them. Romney also closed tax loopholes that brought in another $181 million from businesses over the next two years and over $300 million for his term. He did so in the face of conservative and corporate critics who viewed these actions as tax increases.

The state legislature, with the governor's support, cut spending by $1.6 billion, including $700 million in reductions in state aid to cities and towns. The cuts also included a $140 million reduction in state funding for higher education, which led state-run colleges and universities to increase fees by 63% over four years. Romney sought additional cuts in his last year as governor by vetoing nearly 250 items in the state budget; the legislature overrode all the vetoes.

The cuts in state spending put added pressure on localities to reduce services or raise property taxes, and the share of town and city revenues coming from property taxes rose from 49% to 53%. The combined state and local tax burden in Massachusetts increased during Romney's governorship. He did propose a reduction in the state income tax rate, but the legislature rejected it.

Romney sought to bring near-universal health insurance coverage to the state. This came after Staples founder Tom Stemberg told him at the start of his term that doing so would be the best way he could help people. Another factor was that the federal government, owing to the rules of Medicaid funding, threatened to cut $385 million in those payments to Massachusetts if the state did not reduce the number of uninsured recipients of health care services. Although the idea of universal health insurance had not come to the fore during the campaign, Romney decided that because people without insurance still received expensive health care, the money spent by the state for such care could be better used to subsidize insurance for the poor.

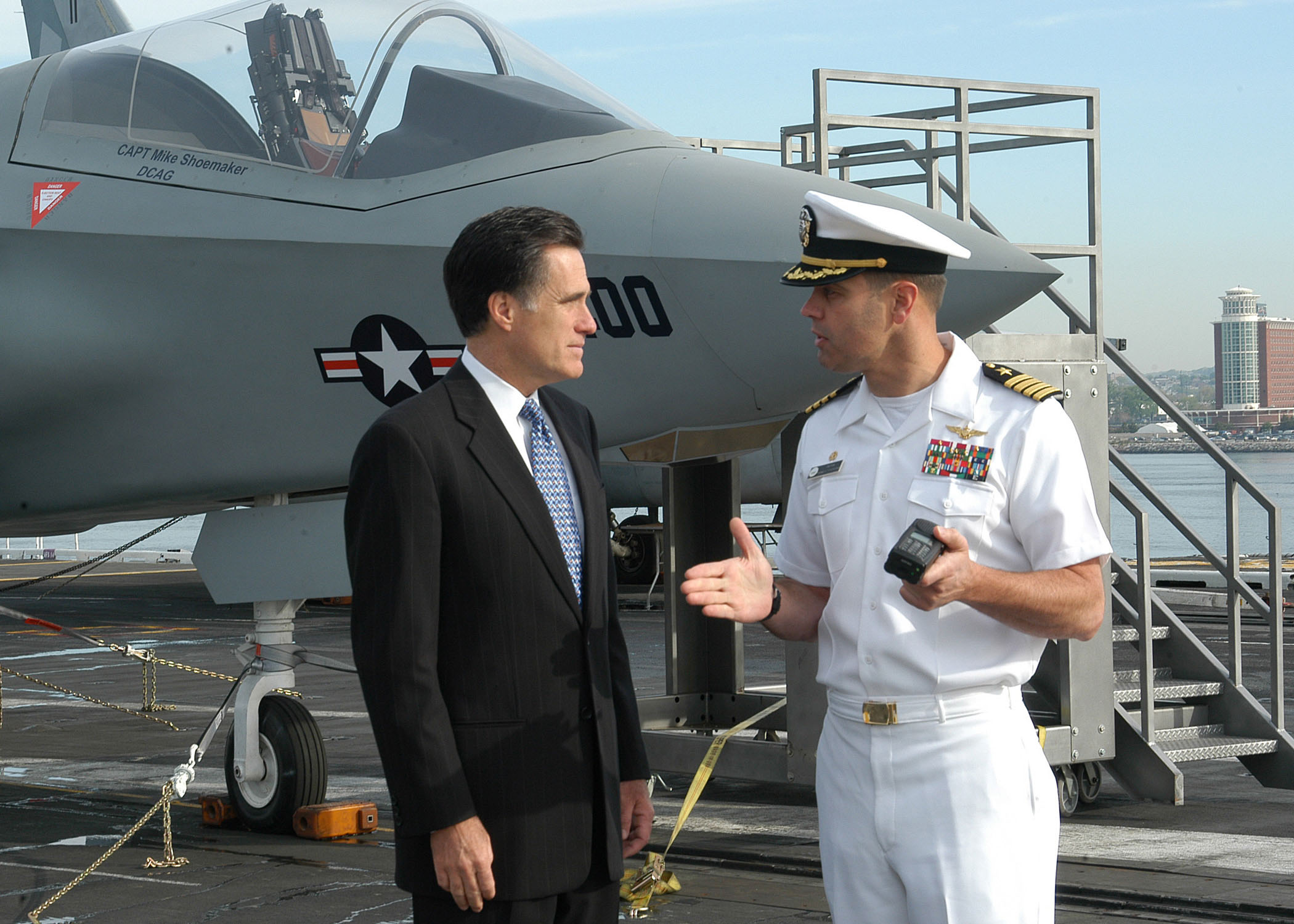
Governor Romney received a tour of the aircraft carrier USS John F. Kennedy on May 20, 2005, as part of celebrating Armed Forces Day.

Determined that a new Massachusetts health insurance measure not raise taxes or resemble the previous decade's failed "Hillarycare" proposal at the federal level, Romney formed a team of consultants from diverse political backgrounds to apply those principles. Beginning in late 2004, they devised a set of proposals that were more ambitious than an incremental one from the Massachusetts Senate and more acceptable to him than one from the Massachusetts House of Representatives that incorporated a new payroll tax. In particular, Romney pushed for incorporating an individual mandate at the state level. Past rival Ted Kennedy, who had made universal health coverage his life's work and who, over time, had developed a warm relationship with Romney, gave the plan a positive reception, which encouraged Democratic legislators to cooperate. The effort eventually gained the support of all major stakeholders within the state, and Romney helped break a logjam between rival Democratic leaders in the legislature.

On April 12, 2006, Romney signed the resulting Massachusetts health reform law, commonly called "Romneycare", which requires nearly all Massachusetts residents to buy health insurance coverage or face escalating tax penalties, such as the loss of their personal income tax exemption. The bill also established means-tested state subsidies for people who lacked adequate employer insurance and whose income was below a threshold, using funds that had covered the health costs of the uninsured. He vetoed eight sections of the health care legislation, including a controversial $295-per-employee assessment on businesses that do not offer health insurance and provisions guaranteeing dental benefits to Medicaid recipients. The legislature overrode all eight vetoes, but the governor's office said the differences were not essential. The law was the first of its kind in the nation and became the signature achievement of Romney's term in office. (Note: Upon passage of the law, Romney said "There really wasn't Republican or Democrat in this. People ask me if this is conservative or liberal, and my answer is yes. It's liberal in the sense that we're getting our citizens health insurance. It's conservative in that we're not getting a government takeover." Within four years, the Massachusetts law had achieved its primary goal of expanding coverage: in 2010, 98% of state residents had coverage, compared to a national average of 83%. Among children and seniors the 2010 coverage rate was even higher, 99.8% and 99.6% respectively. Approximately two-thirds of residents received coverage through employers; one-sixth each received it through Medicare or public plans.)

At the beginning of his governorship, Romney opposed same-sex marriage and civil unions but advocated tolerance and supported some domestic partnership benefits. A November 2003 Massachusetts Supreme Judicial Court decision, Goodridge v. Department of Public Health, required the state to recognize same-sex marriages. Romney reluctantly backed a state constitutional amendment in February 2004 that would have banned those marriages but still allowed civil unions, viewing it as the only feasible way to comply with the court's ruling. In May 2004 and per the court decision, he instructed town clerks to begin issuing marriage licenses to same-sex couples. But citing a 1913 law that barred out-of-state residents from getting married in Massachusetts if their union would be illegal in their home state, he said no marriage licenses were to be issued to people not planning to move to Massachusetts. In June 2005, Romney abandoned his support for the compromise amendment, stating that it confused voters who opposed both same-sex marriage and civil unions. Instead, he endorsed a ballot initiative led by the Coalition for Marriage and Family (an alliance of socially conservative organizations) that would have banned same-sex marriage and made no provisions for civil unions. In 2004 and 2006, he urged the U.S. Senate to vote for the Federal Marriage Amendment.

In 2005, Romney revealed a change of view regarding abortion, moving from the abortion rights positions expressed during his 1994 and 2002 campaigns to an anti-abortion one in opposition to Roe v. Wade. He attributed his conversion to an interaction with Harvard University biologist Douglas Melton, an expert on embryonic stem cell biology, although Melton vehemently disputed Romney's recollection of their conversation. Romney subsequently vetoed a bill on pro-life grounds that expanded access to emergency contraception in hospitals and pharmacies; the legislature overrode the veto. He also amended his position on embryonic stem cell research. (Note: Romney also amended his position on embryonic stem cell research: having once supported it broadly, he changed to being against therapeutic cloning of embryos for scientific research, insisting that "surplus embryos" from fertility treatments should be used instead.)

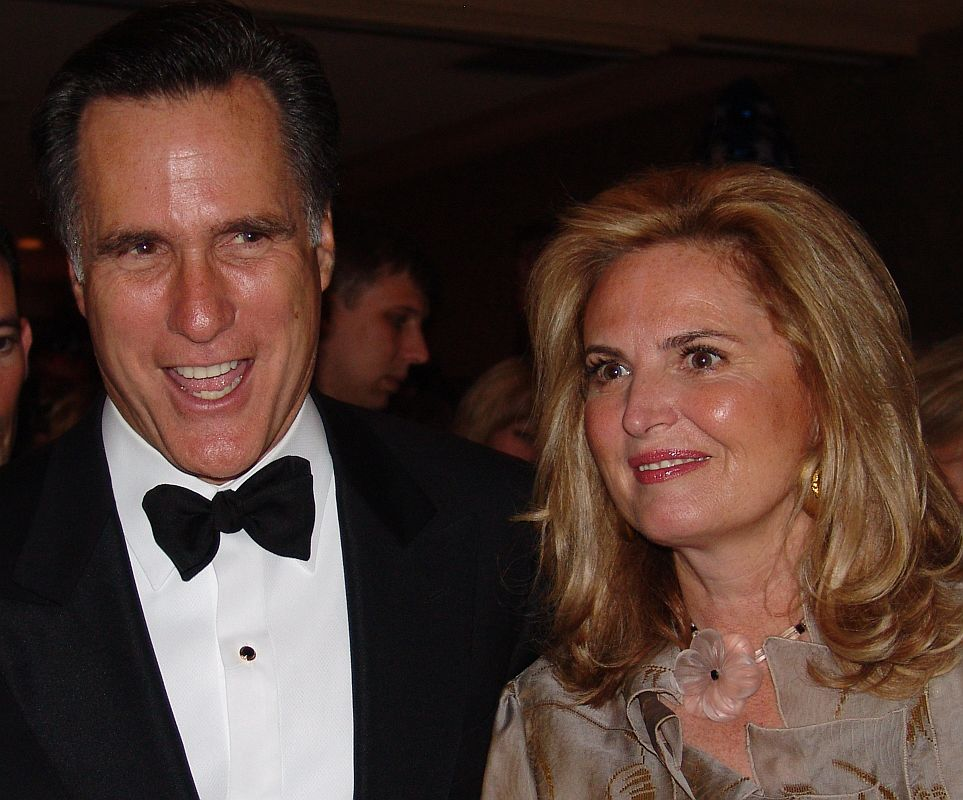
Mitt and Ann Romney at the White House Correspondents Dinner, 2005

Romney used a bully pulpit approach towards promoting his agenda, staging well-organized media events to appeal directly to the public rather than pushing his proposals in behind-doors sessions with the state legislature. He dealt with a public crisis of confidence in Boston's Big Dig project after a fatal ceiling collapse in 2006 by wresting control of the project from the Massachusetts Turnpike Authority. After two years of negotiating the state's participation in the landmark Regional Greenhouse Gas Initiative that instituted a cap-and-trade arrangement for power plant emissions in the Northeast, Romney pulled Massachusetts out of the initiative shortly before its signing in December 2005, citing a lack of cost limits for industry.

In 2004, Romney spent considerable effort trying to bolster the state Republican Party, but it failed to gain any seats in the legislative elections that year. Given a prime-time appearance at the 2004 Republican National Convention, he began to be discussed as a potential 2008 presidential candidate. Midway through his term, Romney decided that he wanted to stage a full-time run for president, and on December 14, 2005, he announced that he would not seek reelection as governor. As chair of the Republican Governors Association, Romney traveled around the country, meeting prominent Republicans and building a national political network; he spent more than 200 days out of state in 2006, preparing for his run.

Romney had a 61 percent job approval rating after his initial fiscal actions in 2003, but it subsequently declined, driven in part by his frequent out-of-state travel. It stood at 34 percent in November 2006, ranking 48th of the 50 U.S. governors. In the 2006 Massachusetts gubernatorial election, Democratic nominee Deval Patrick beat Romney's lieutenant governor, Kerry Healey, by 20 points, with the win partially due to dissatisfaction with Romney's administration and the weak condition of the state Republican party.

Romney filed to register a presidential campaign committee with the Federal Election Commission on his penultimate day in office as governor. His term ended on January 4, 2007.

== 2008 presidential campaign ==
Romney formally announced his candidacy for the 2008 Republican nomination for president on February 13, 2007, in Dearborn, Michigan. Again casting himself as a political outsider, his speech frequently invoked his father and his family, and stressed experiences in the private, public, and voluntary sectors that had brought him to this point.

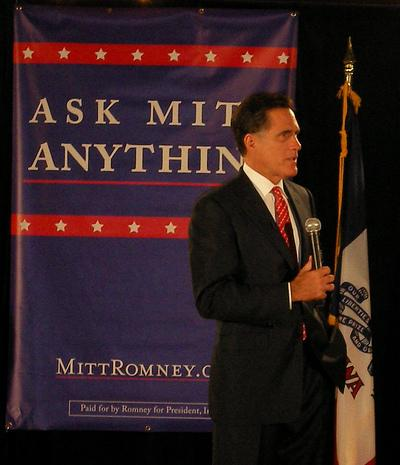
Holding an "Ask Mitt Anything" session in Ames, Iowa, in May 2007

The campaign emphasized Romney's highly profitable career in the business world and his stewardship of the 2002 Olympics. (Note: American political opinion periodically looked towards industry for business managers who it was thought could straighten out what was held to be wrong in the nation's capital. The track record of such efforts was at best mixed, with Lee Iacocca declining to run, Romney's father George and Steve Forbes failing to get far in the primaries, and Ross Perot staging one of the more successful third-party runs in American history.) He also had political experience as a governor, together with a political pedigree courtesy of his father (as well as many biographical parallels with him). (Note: Biographical parallels between George and Mitt Romney include: Both served as Mormon missionaries in Europe and considered the experiences formative. Both pursued high school sweethearts single-mindedly until the women agreed to marry them several years later, then had families with four or five children. Both had very successful careers in business and became known for turning around failing companies or organizations. Both presided over a stake in the LDS Church. Both achieved their first elected position at age 55, as Republican governor of a Democratic-leaning state. The two bear a close physical resemblance at similar ages and both have been said to "look like a president". Both staged their first presidential run in the year they turned 60. Both were considered suspect by ideological conservatives within the Republican Party. Neither protested publicly against the LDS Church policy that did not allow black people in its lay clergy, although the elder Romney hoped the church leadership would revise the policy, and his son has said that he was greatly relieved when the church did so in 1978. There are also obvious differences in their paths, including that George had a hardscrabble upbringing while Mitt's was affluent, and that Mitt far exceeded George's accomplishments in formal education. Another is that Mitt's personality is more reserved, private, and controlled than his father's was, traits he got from his mother Lenore, and his political personality is also shaped at least as much by Lenore as by George. And while George was willing to defy political trends, Mitt has been much more willing to adapt to them.) Ann Romney, who had become an advocate for those with multiple sclerosis, was in remission and was an active participant in his campaign, helping to soften his political personality. Media stories called the 6-foot-2-inch (1.88 m) Romney handsome; a number of commentators noted that with his square jaw and ample hair graying at the temples, he matched a common image of what a president should look like.

Romney's liabilities included having run for senator and serving as governor in one of the nation's most liberal states and having taken positions in opposition to the party's conservative base during that time. Late during his term as governor, he had shifted positions and emphases to better align with traditional conservatives on social issues. Skeptics, including some Republicans, charged Romney with opportunism and a lack of core principles. As a Mormon, he faced suspicion and skepticism by some in the Evangelical wing of the party.

For his campaign, Romney assembled a veteran group of Republican staffers, consultants, and pollsters. But he was little-known nationally, and hovered around 10% support in Republican preference polls for the first half of 2007. He proved the most effective fundraiser of any of the Republican candidates and also partly financed his campaign with his own personal fortune. These resources, combined with the mid-year near-collapse of nominal front-runner John McCain's campaign, made Romney a threat to win the nomination and the focus of the other candidates' attacks. Romney's staff suffered from internal strife; Romney himself was at times indecisive, often asking for more data before making a decision.

During all his political campaigns, Romney has avoided speaking publicly about Mormon doctrines, referring to the U.S. Constitution's prohibition of religious tests for public office. But persistent questions about the role of religion in his life, as well as Southern Baptist minister and former governor of Arkansas Mike Huckabee's rise in the polls based on an explicitly Christian-themed campaign, led to Romney's December 6, 2007, "Faith in America" speech. In it, Romney declared, "I believe in my Mormon faith and endeavor to live by it. My faith is the faith of my fathers. I will be true to them and to my beliefs." He added that he should be neither elected nor rejected because of his religion, and echoed Senator John F. Kennedy's famous speech during his 1960 presidential campaign in saying, "I will put no doctrine of any church above the plain duties of the office and the sovereign authority of the law." Instead of discussing the specific tenets of his faith, he said he would be informed by it, saying: "Freedom requires religion just as religion requires freedom. Freedom and religion endure together, or perish alone." Academics later studied the role religion played in the campaign. (Note: Regarding the role of Romney's religion in the 2008 campaign, one academic study, based upon research conducted throughout the 2008 primaries, showed that a negative perception of Mormonism was widespread during the election, and that perception was often resistant to factual information that would correct mistaken notions about the religion or Romney's relationship to it. The authors concluded that, "For Romney ... religion is the central story." Another study, analyzing a survey conducted during January 2008 (when an African American, a woman, and a Mormon all had realistic chances of becoming the first president from that group), found that voters had internally accepted the notion of black equality, paving the way for Barack Obama's election; had partially established but not fully internalized the notion of gender equality, making Hillary Clinton's task somewhat more difficult; but had only selectively internalized the notion of religious equality, and in particular not extended it to Mormons, thus making Romney's run significantly more difficult. Those authors concluded that, "for a Mormon candidate, the road to the presidency remains very rough ... The bias against a Mormon candidate is substantial.")

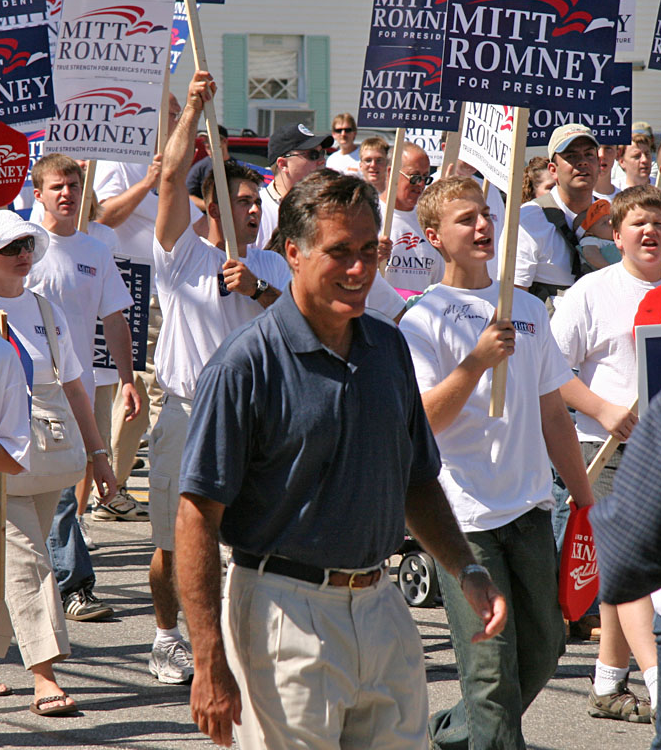
Romney and supporters campaigning in New Hampshire, September 2007

The campaign's strategy called for winning the initial two contests – the January 3, 2008, Iowa Republican caucuses and the January 8 New Hampshire primary – to propel Romney nationally. But he took second place in both, losing Iowa to Huckabee, who received more than twice the evangelical Christian votes, and New Hampshire to the resurgent McCain. Huckabee and McCain criticized Romney's image as a flip-flopper and this label stuck to Romney through the campaign (one that Romney rejected as unfair and inaccurate, except for his acknowledged change of mind on abortion). Romney seemed to approach the campaign as a management consulting exercise, and showed a lack of personal warmth and political feel; journalist Evan Thomas wrote that Romney "came off as a phony, even when he was perfectly sincere". The fervor with which Romney adopted his new stances and attitudes contributed to the perception of inauthenticity that hampered the campaign. His staff concluded that competing as a candidate of social conservatism and ideological purity rather than of pragmatic competence had been a mistake.

McCain's win in South Carolina and Romney's in his childhood home Michigan set up a pivotal battle in the January 29 Florida primary. Romney campaigned intensively on economic issues and the burgeoning subprime mortgage crisis, while McCain attacked Romney on Iraq policy and benefited from endorsements from Florida officeholders. McCain won by five points. Although many Republican officials were now lining up behind McCain, Romney persisted through the nationwide Super Tuesday contests on February 5. There he won primaries or caucuses in several states, but McCain won in more and in larger-population ones. Trailing McCain in delegates by a more than two-to-one margin, Romney announced the end of his campaign on February 7.

Altogether, Romney had won 11 primaries and caucuses, receiving about 4.7 million votes and garnering about 280 delegates. He spent $110 million during the campaign, including $45 million of his own money.

Romney endorsed McCain for president a week later, and McCain had Romney on a short list for running mate, where his business experience would have balanced one of McCain's weaknesses. Behind in the polls, McCain opted instead for a high-risk, high-reward "game changer", Alaska governor Sarah Palin. McCain lost the election to Democratic senator Barack Obama.

== Activity between presidential campaigns ==
Romney supported the Bush administration's Troubled Asset Relief Program in response to the 2008 financial crisis, later saying that it prevented the U.S. financial system from collapsing. During the U.S. automotive industry crisis of 2008–2010, he opposed a bailout of the industry in the form of direct government intervention, and argued that a managed bankruptcy of struggling automobile companies should instead be accompanied by federal guarantees for post-bankruptcy financing from the private sector.

After the 2008 election, Romney laid the groundwork for a 2012 presidential campaign by using his Free and Strong America political action committee (PAC) to raise money for other Republican candidates and pay his existing political staff's salaries and consulting fees. A network of former staff and supporters around the nation were eager for him to run again. He continued to give speeches and raise funds for Republicans, but fearing overexposure, turned down many potential media appearances. He also spoke before business, educational, and motivational groups. From 2009 to 2011, he served on the board of directors of Marriott International, founded by his namesake J. Willard Marriott. He had previously served on it from 1993 to 2002. (Note: During most of Romney's first stint on the Marriott board, he was a member of, and for six years chair of, the board's audit committee. In 1994, during Romney's time as chair, Marriott implemented the Son of BOSS tax shelter, which resulted in the company claiming $71 million in losses. In 2008 and 2009, federal courts ruled this use of the shelter illegal and said those losses never existed. PolitiFact.com calls a 2012 claim that Romney personally approved the shelter as "Half True".)

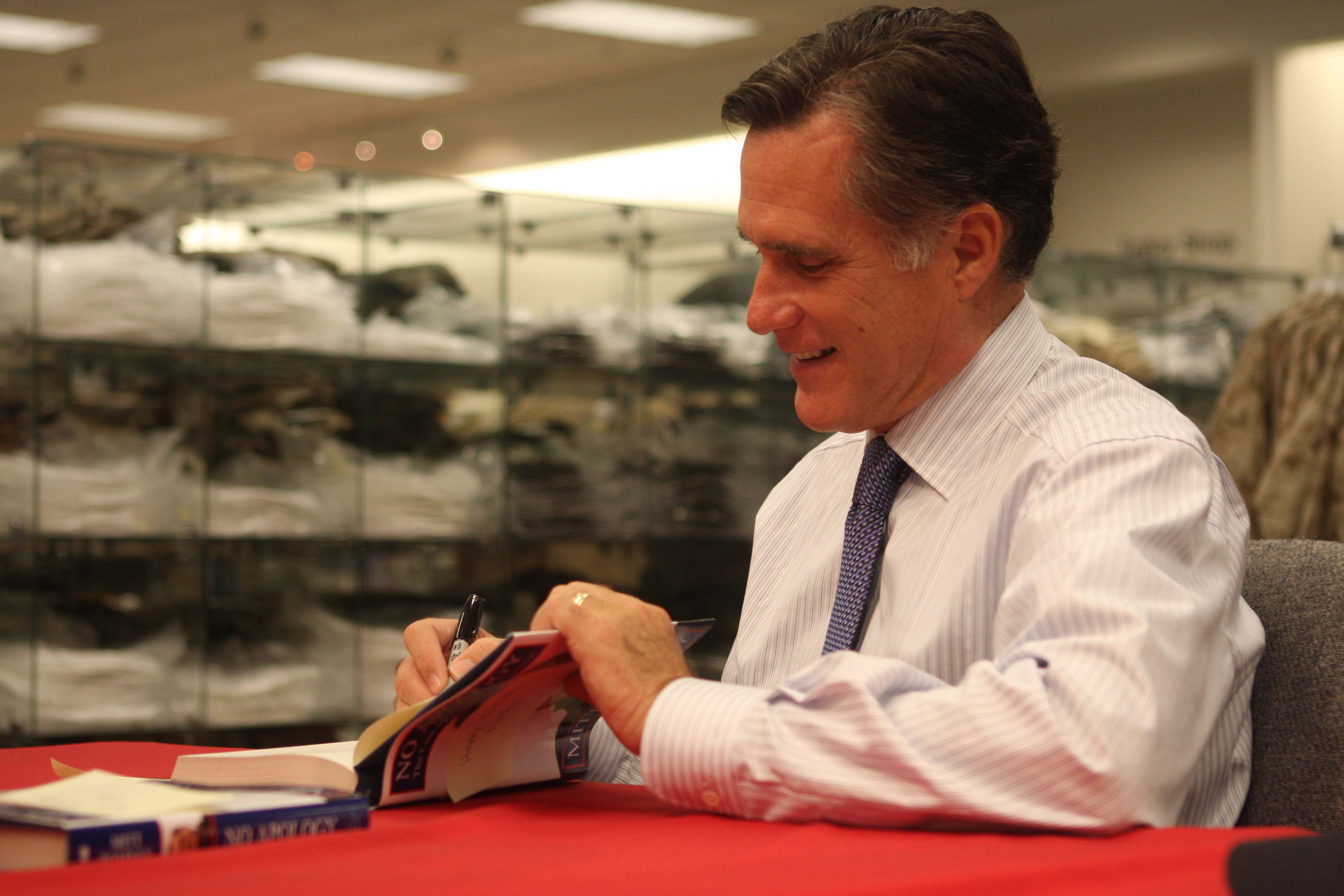
Romney signing copies of his new book No Apology: The Case for American Greatness for service members at Marine Corps Air Station Miramar in March 2010

In 2009, the Romneys sold their primary residence in Belmont and their ski chalet in Utah, leaving them an estate along Lake Winnipesaukee in Wolfeboro, New Hampshire, and an oceanfront home in the La Jolla district of San Diego, California, which they had bought the year before. The La Jolla home proved beneficial in location and climate for Ann Romney's multiple sclerosis therapies and for recovering from her late 2008 diagnosis of mammary ductal carcinoma in situ and subsequent lumpectomy. Both it and the New Hampshire estate were near some of their grandchildren. Romney maintained his voting registration in Massachusetts, however, and bought a smaller condominium in Belmont during 2010. In February 2010, Romney had a minor altercation with LMFAO member Skyler Gordy, known as Sky Blu, on an airplane flight. (Note: After having attended the 2010 Winter Olympics, Romney and wife were on board an Air Canada plane waiting to take off on a flight from Vancouver to Los Angeles when he got into a physical altercation with Sky Blu, sitting in front of him, over Sky Blu's seat not being in the upright position. Romney said that Sky Blu became physically violent and that he did not retaliate, while Sky Blu said that Romney gave him a "Vulcan grip" first and that he responded physically to that. Sky Blu was escorted off the aircraft by Canadian police but Romney did not press charges and Sky Blu was released.)

Romney released his book, No Apology: The Case for American Greatness, in March 2010, and undertook an 18-state book tour to promote it. In the book, he writes of his belief in American exceptionalism, and presents his economic and geopolitical views rather than anecdotes about his personal or political life. It debuted atop The New York Times Best Seller list. Romney donated his earnings from the book to charity.

Immediately after the March 2010 passage of the Patient Protection and Affordable Care Act, Romney attacked the landmark legislation as "an unconscionable abuse of power" and said it should be repealed. The antipathy Republicans felt for it created a potential problem for Romney, since the new federal law was in many ways similar to the Massachusetts health care reform passed during his gubernatorial tenure; as one Associated Press article stated, "Obamacare ... looks a lot like Romneycare." While acknowledging that his plan was an imperfect work in progress, Romney did not back away from it. He defended the state-level health insurance mandate that underpinned it, calling the bill the right answer to Massachusetts's problems at the time.

In nationwide opinion polling for the 2012 Republican presidential primaries, Romney led or placed in the top three with Palin and Huckabee. A January 2010 National Journal survey of political insiders found that a majority of Republican insiders and a plurality of Democratic insiders predicted Romney would be the party's 2012 nominee. Romney campaigned heavily for Republican candidates in the 2010 midterm elections, raising more money than the other prospective 2012 Republican presidential candidates.

== 2012 presidential campaign ==
=== Primary election ===
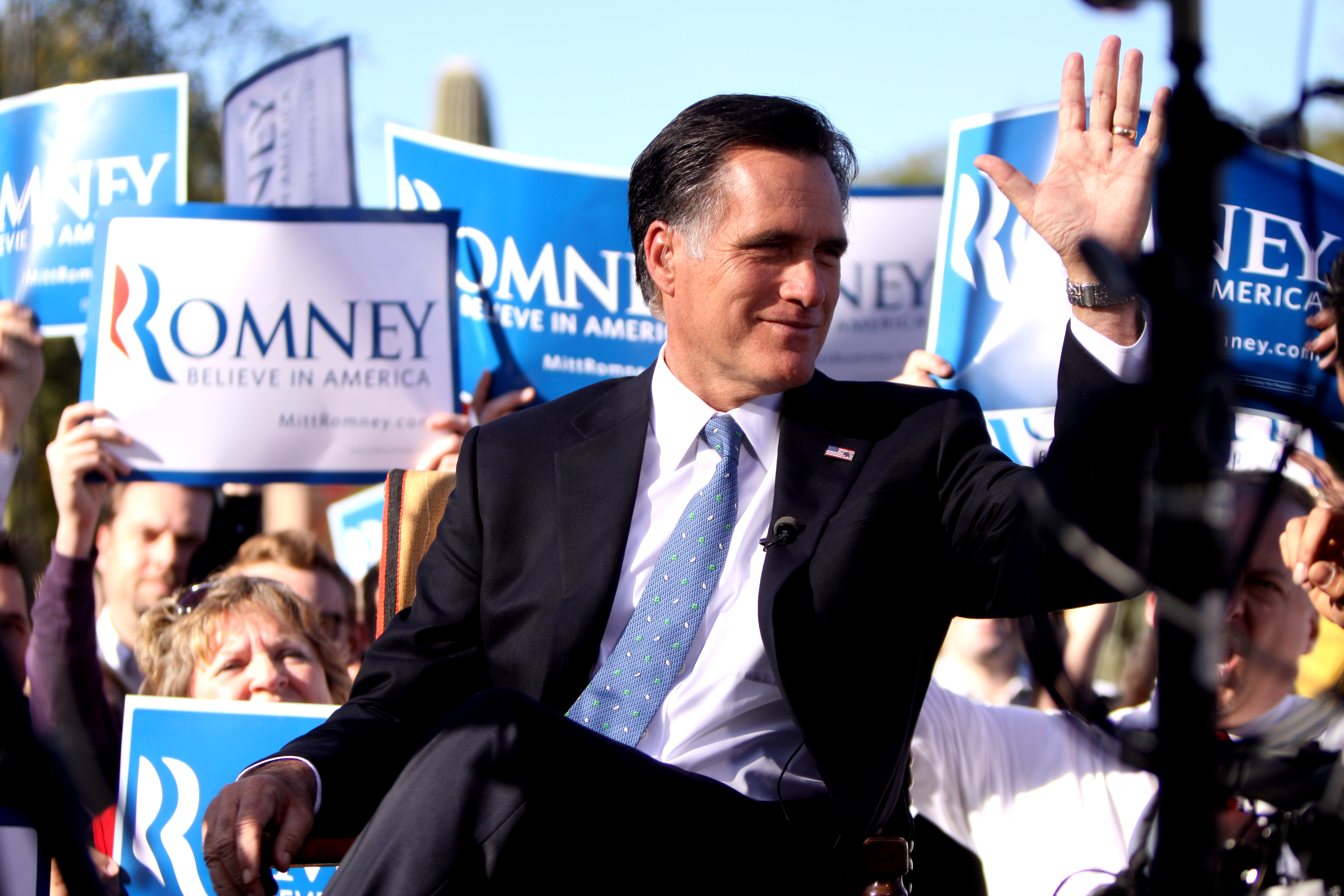
Giving an interview at a supporters rally in Paradise Valley, Arizona

On April 11, 2011, Romney announced, in a video taped outdoors at the University of New Hampshire, that he had formed an exploratory committee for a run for the Republican presidential nomination. Quinnipiac University political science professor Scott McLean said, "We all knew that he was going to run. He's really been running for president ever since the day after the 2008 election."

Romney stood to benefit from the Republican electorate's tendency to nominate candidates who had previously run for president, and thus appeared to be next in line to be chosen. The early stages of the race found him as the apparent front-runner in a weak field, especially in terms of fundraising prowess and organization. Perhaps his greatest hurdle in gaining the Republican nomination was party opposition to the Massachusetts health care reform law that he had shepherded five years earlier. As many potential Republican candidates with star power and fundraising ability decided not to run (including Mike Pence, John Thune, Haley Barbour, Mike Huckabee, and Mitch Daniels), Republican party figures searched for plausible alternatives to Romney.

On June 2, 2011, Romney formally announced the start of his campaign. Speaking on a farm in Stratham, New Hampshire, he focused on the economy and criticized Obama's handling of it. He said, "In the campaign to come, the American ideals of economic freedom and opportunity need a clear and unapologetic defense, and I intend to make it – because I have lived it."

Romney raised $56 million in 2011, more than double the amount raised by any of his Republican opponents, and refrained from spending his own money on the campaign. He initially pursued a low-key, low-profile strategy. Michele Bachmann staged a brief surge in polls, which preceded a poll surge in September 2011 by Rick Perry, who had entered the race the month before. Perry and Romney exchanged sharp criticisms of each other during a series of debates among the Republican candidates. The October 2011 decisions of Palin and Chris Christie not to run effectively settled the field of candidates. Perry faded after poor performances in those debates, while Herman Cain's "long-shot" bid gained popularity until allegations of sexual misconduct derailed it.

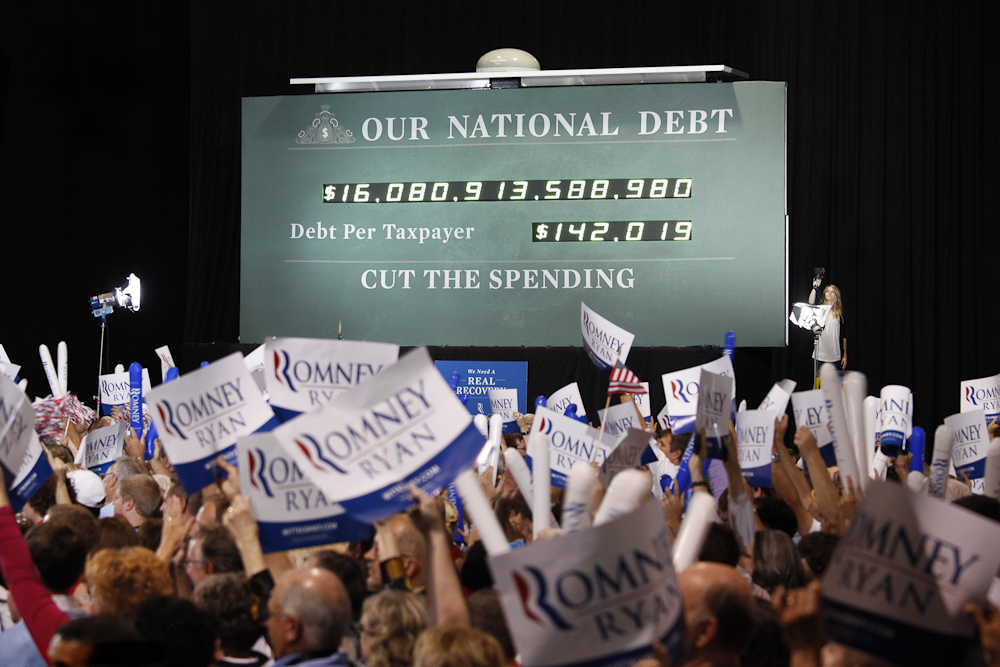
Romney campaign event in Toledo, Ohio

Romney continued to seek support from a wary Republican electorate; at this point in the race, his poll numbers were relatively flat and at a historically low level for a Republican front-runner. After the charges of flip-flopping that marked his 2008 campaign began to accumulate again, Romney said in November 2011: "I've been as consistent as human beings can be." In the month before voting began, Newt Gingrich experienced a significant surge – taking a solid lead in national polls and most of the early caucus and primary states – before settling back into parity or worse with Romney following a barrage of negative ads from Restore Our Future, a pro-Romney Super PAC.

In the initial contest, the Iowa caucuses of January 3, election officials announced Romney as ahead with 25% of the vote, edging out a late-gaining Rick Santorum by eight votes (Ron Paul finished third). Sixteen days later, however, they certified Santorum as the winner by 34 votes. A week after the Iowa caucuses, Romney earned a decisive win in the New Hampshire primary with 39% of the vote; Paul finished second and Jon Huntsman Jr. third.

In the run-up to the South Carolina Republican primary, Gingrich launched ads criticizing Romney for causing job losses while at Bain Capital, Perry referred to Romney's role there as "vulture capitalism", and Palin pressed Romney to prove his claim that he created 100,000 jobs during that time. Romney also faced accusations of asset stripping. Many conservatives rallied in defense of Romney, rejecting what they took to be criticism of free-market capitalism. During two debates in the state, Romney fumbled questions about releasing his income tax returns, while Gingrich gained support with audience-rousing attacks on the debate moderators. Romney's double-digit lead in state polls evaporated; he lost the January 21 primary to Gingrich by 13 points. Combined with the delayed loss in Iowa, Romney's poor week represented a lost chance to end the race early, and he quickly decided to release two years of his tax returns. The race turned to the Florida primary, where in debates, appearances, and advertisements, Romney launched a sustained barrage against Gingrich's record, associations and electability. Romney enjoyed a large spending advantage from both his campaign and his aligned Super PAC, and after a record-breaking rate of negative ads from both sides, Romney won Florida on January 31, with 46% of the vote to Gingrich's 32%.

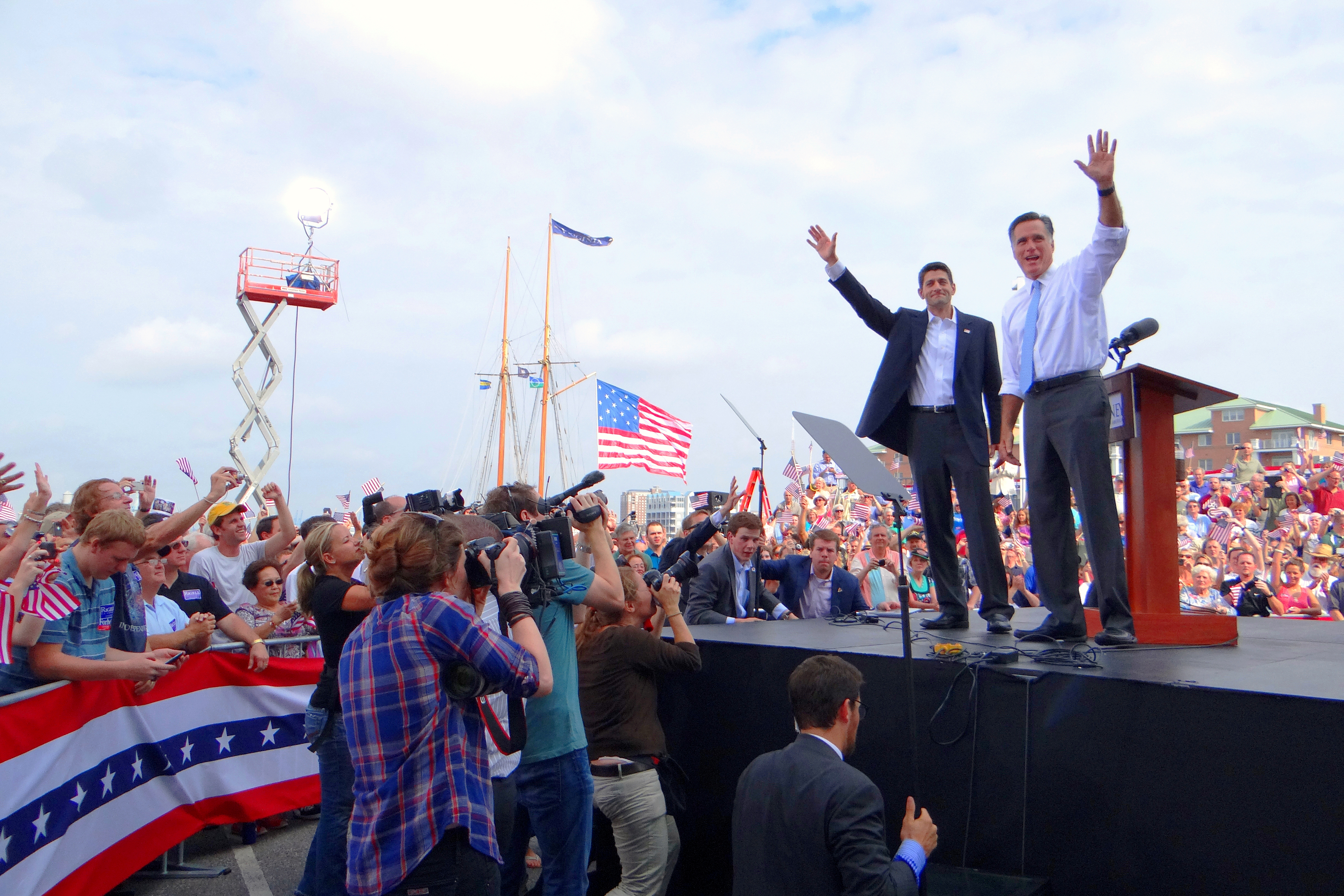
With running mate Paul Ryan in Norfolk, Virginia, during the vice presidential selection announcement on August 11, 2012

Several caucuses and primaries took place during February, and Santorum won three in a single night early in the month, propelling him into the lead in national and some state polls and positioning him as Romney's chief rival. Days later, Romney told the Conservative Political Action Conference that he had been a "severely conservative governor" (while in 2005 he had maintained that his positions were moderate and characterized reports that he was shifting to the right to attract conservative votes as a media distortion). He sought Donald Trump's endorsement, and received it in February 2012, with a speech by Trump and Romney in which Romney joked that he had spent his "life in the private sector, not quite as successful as this guy [Trump] but successful nonetheless". Romney won the other five February contests, including a closely fought one in Michigan at the end of the month. In the Super Tuesday primaries and caucuses of March 6, Romney won six of ten contests, including a narrow victory in Ohio over a vastly outspent Santorum. Although his victories were not enough to end the race, they were enough to establish a two-to-one delegate lead over Santorum. Romney maintained his delegate margin through subsequent contests, and Santorum suspended his campaign on April 10. Following a sweep of five more contests on April 24, the Republican National Committee put its resources to work for Romney as the party's presumptive nominee.

=== General election ===
Polls consistently indicated a tight race for the November general election. Negative ads from both sides dominated the campaign, with Obama's proclaiming that Romney shipped jobs overseas while at Bain Capital and kept money in offshore tax havens and Swiss bank accounts. A related issue dealt with Romney's purported responsibility for actions at Bain Capital after taking the Olympics post. Romney faced demands from Democrats to release additional years of his tax returns, an action a number of Republicans also felt would be wise; after being adamant that he would not do that, he released summaries of them in late September. During May and June, the Obama campaign spent heavily and was able to paint a negative image of Romney in voters' minds before the Romney campaign could construct a positive one.

In July 2012, Romney visited the United Kingdom, Israel, and Poland, meeting leaders in an effort to raise his credibility as a world statesman. Comments he made about the readiness of the 2012 Summer Olympics were perceived as undiplomatic by the British press. Israeli Prime Minister (and former BCG colleague) Benjamin Netanyahu embraced Romney, though some Palestinians criticized him for suggesting that Israel's culture led to their greater economic success.

On August 11, 2012, the Romney campaign announced Representative Paul Ryan of Wisconsin as his running mate. On August 28, 2012, the 2012 Republican National Convention in Tampa, Florida, officially nominated Romney for president. Romney became the first LDS Church member to be a major-party presidential nominee.

In mid-September, a video surfaced of Romney speaking before a group of supporters in which he said that 47% of the nation pays no income tax, are dependent on the federal government, see themselves as victims, and will support Obama unconditionally. He went on to say, "And so my job is not to worry about those people. I'll never convince them that they should take personal responsibility and care for their lives." After facing criticism about the tone and accuracy of these comments, he at first characterized them as "inelegantly stated", then a couple of weeks later commented: "I said something that's just completely wrong." Exit polls published following the election showed that voters never saw Romney as someone who cared about people like them.

In an interview on CNN with Wolf Blitzer, Romney called Russia "our number one geopolitical foe". At the time an innocuous response to a foreign policy question, it became a focal point for Democratic attacks on Romney during the campaign. Hillary Clinton, then secretary of state, called Romney's position "dated" and said Russia had been an ally in solving problems, while Joe Biden, then vice president, accused Romney of having a "Cold War mentality" and being "uninformed" on foreign policy. John Kerry, then a senator, called Romney's comments "breathtakingly off target" and reiterated that position at the Democratic National Convention, saying, "He's even blurted out the preposterous notion that Russia is our number one political geopolitical foe." Romney defended his remarks, saying, "The nation which consistently opposes our actions at the United Nations has been Russia ... Russia is a geopolitical foe in that regard", and continued to defend his position in the presidential debates.

Electoral College results

The first of three 2012 presidential election debates took place on October 3, in Denver. Media figures and political analysts widely viewed Romney as having delivered a stronger and more focused presentation than Obama. That debate overshadowed Obama's improved presentation in the next two debates later in October, and Romney maintained a small advantage in the debates when seen as a whole.

The election took place on November 6, and Obama was projected the winner at about 11:14 pm Eastern Standard Time. He won 332 electoral votes to Romney's 206. Romney lost all but one of nine battleground states and received 47% of the popular vote to Obama's 51%. Media accounts described Romney as "shellshocked" by the result. Romney and his senior campaign staff had disbelieved public polls showing Obama narrowly ahead and had thought they were going to win until the vote tallies began to be reported on election night. But Romney's get out the vote operation had been inferior to Obama's, both in person-to-person organization and in voter modeling and outreach technology (the latter exemplified by the failure of the Project Orca application).

In his concession speech to his supporters, he said, "I so wish that I had been able to fulfill your hopes to lead this country in a different direction, but the nation chose another leader." Reflecting on his defeat during a conference call to hundreds of fundraisers and donors a week after the election, Romney attributed the outcome to Obama's having secured the votes of specific interest groups, including African Americans, Hispanic Americans, young people, and women, by offering them what Romney called "extraordinary financial gifts". The remark drew heavy criticism from prominent members of the Republican party.

== Subsequent activities ==
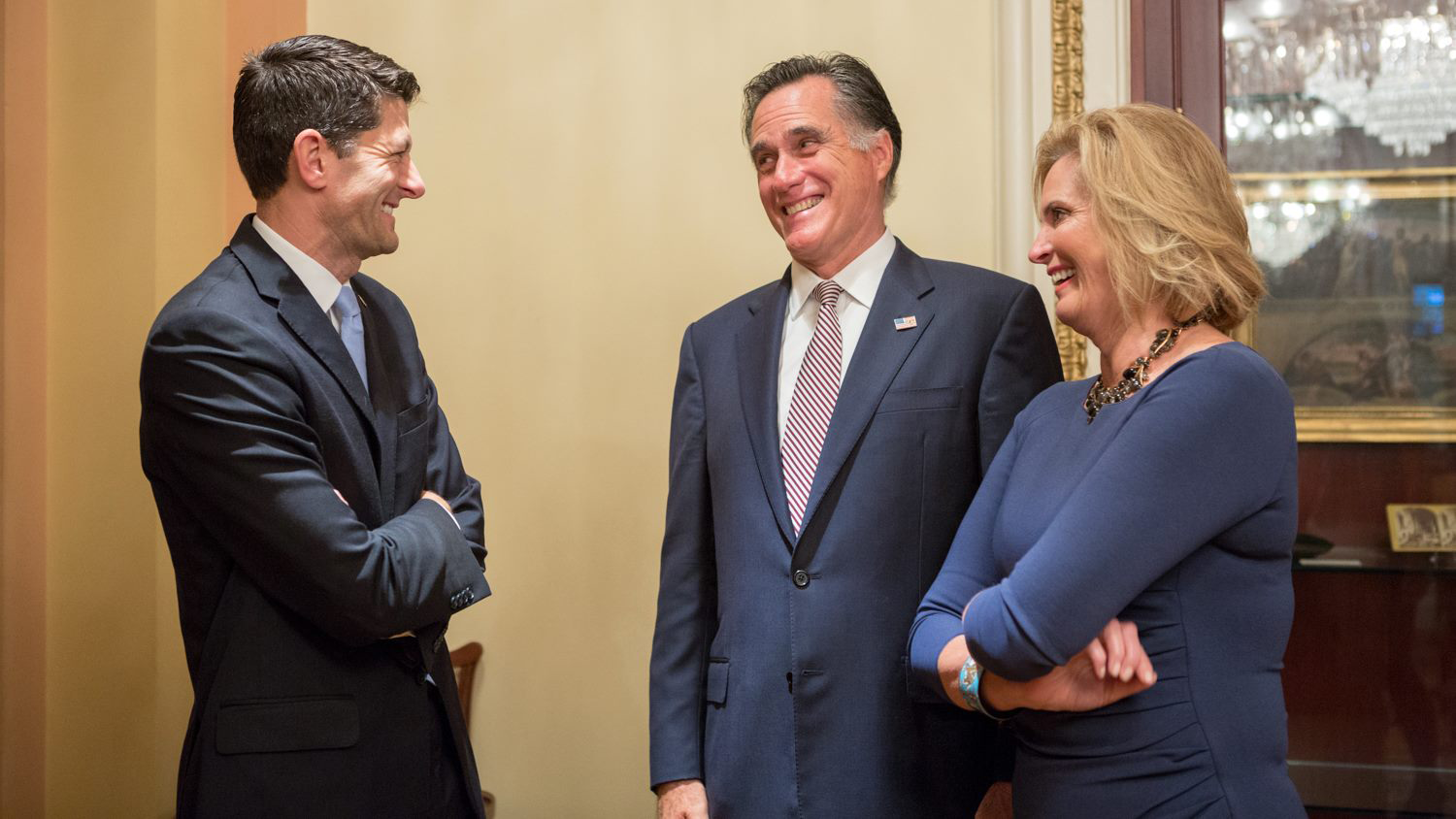
Mitt and Ann Romney with Paul Ryan in 2015

During the first year after his defeat, Romney generally kept a low profile, with his ordinary daily activities around San Diego captured via social media glimpses. In December 2012, he joined the board of Marriott International for a third stint as a director. In March 2013, Romney gave a reflective interview on Fox News Sunday, saying, "It kills me not to be there, not to be in the White House doing what needs to be done." He again expressed regret at the "47 percent" remark, saying "There's no question that hurt and did real damage to my campaign." (He echoed both those sentiments a year later.) Romney began working as executive partner group chairman for Solamere Capital, a private capital firm in Boston owned by his son Tagg. He was also involved in supporting several charitable causes.

The Romneys bought a home in the Deer Valley area of Park City, Utah, and a property in Holladay, Utah, where they planned to tear down an existing house and build a new one. They also gained long-sought permission to replace their La Jolla home with a much bigger one, including a car elevator that had brought some derision during the 2012 campaign. Romney and his siblings continued to own a cottage in a gated community called Beach O' Pines south of Grand Bend, Ontario, which has been in the family for more than 60 years. With the new acquisitions the couple briefly had five homes, near each of their five sons and their families, and the couple continued to spend considerable time with their grandchildren, who by 2013, numbered 22. They then sold the condominium in Belmont and decided to make their main residence in Utah, switching their voter registration. The 2014 documentary film Mitt showed a behind-the-scenes, family-based perspective on both of Romney's presidential campaigns and received positive reviews for humanizing Romney and illustrating the toll campaigning takes.

Romney thought he might be branded a "loser for life" and fade into an obscurity like his fellow former Massachusetts governor Michael Dukakis (a similar figure with no obvious base of political support who had lost what his party considered a winnable presidential election) but, to the surprise of many political observers, that did not happen. Romney reemerged onto the political scene in the run-up to the 2014 U.S. midterm elections, endorsing, campaigning, and fundraising for a number of Republican candidates, especially those running for the U.S. Senate.

=== 2016 presidential election ===
External videos
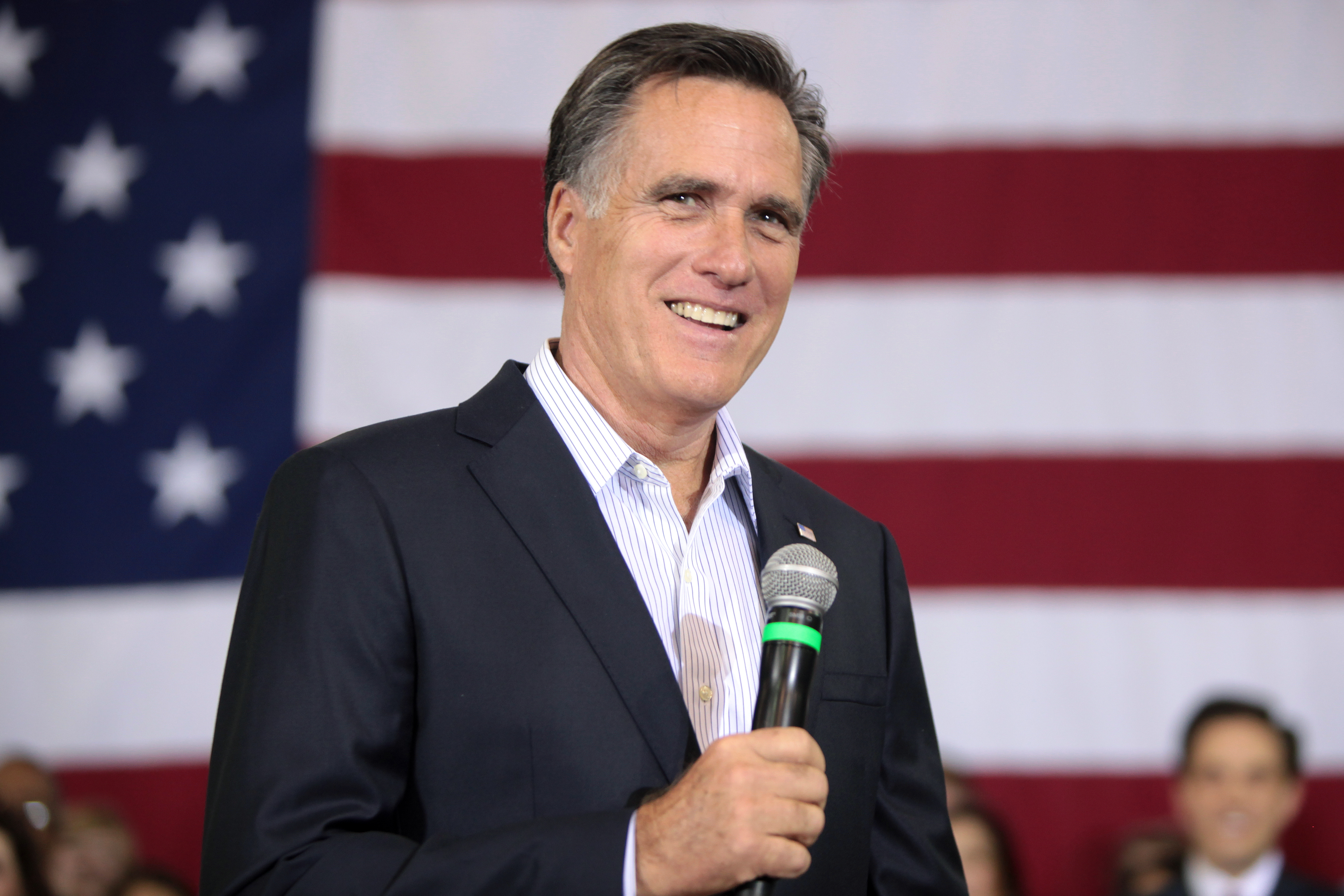
- Watch Mitt Romney's full March 3 speech: 'Trump is a phony, a fraud', 17:49, see 2;40–10:00, PBS Newshour
- Donald Trump responds to Romney's comments at Maine rally, 43:25, see 7:50–10:00, PBS Newshour

By early 2014, the lack of a clear mainstream Republican candidate for the 2016 presidential election led some supporters, donors, and pollsters to suggest that Romney stage a third run. Regarding such a possibility, Romney at first refused. Nevertheless, speculation continued: Obama's declining popularity led to remorse among some voters; the 2014 Russian military intervention in Ukraine made Romney's "number one geopolitical foe" remark look prescient; and an August 2014 poll of Iowa Republicans showed Romney with a large lead there over other potential 2016 candidates. A July 2014 CNN poll showed Romney with a 53% to 44% lead over Obama in a hypothetical election "redo".

By early 2015, Romney was considering the idea and contacting his network of supporters. In doing so he was positioning himself in the invisible primary – the preliminary jockeying for the backing of party leaders, donors, and political operatives – against former Florida governor Jeb Bush, who had already set a likely campaign in motion and would be a rival to Romney for establishment Republican support. Despite support in some quarters for a third bid for the presidency, there was a backlash from conservatives who wanted a fresher face without a history of presidential losses, and many of Romney's past donors were not willing to commit to him again. On January 30, 2015, Romney announced that he would not run for president in 2016, saying that while he thought he could win the nomination, "one of our next generation of Republican leaders" would be better positioned to win the general election.

=== Relationship with Donald Trump ===
As the presidential election went into primary season, Romney had not endorsed anyone but was one of the Republican establishment figures who were becoming increasingly concerned about the front-runner status of New York businessman Donald Trump. Romney publicly criticized Trump for not releasing his taxes, saying there might be a "bombshell" in them. Trump responded by calling Romney "one of the dumbest and worst candidates in the history of Republican politics". In a March 3, 2016 speech at the Hinckley Institute of Politics, Romney made a scathing attack on Trump's personal behavior, business performance, and domestic and foreign policy stances. He called him a "con man" who relied on his father's loans and "a phony, a fraud", adding: "He's playing members of the American public for suckers. If we Republicans choose Donald Trump as our nominee, the prospects for a safe and prosperous future are greatly diminished". In response, Trump called Romney a "choke artist". Romney's speech represented an unprecedented attack by a major U.S. party's most recent presidential nominee against the party's current front-runner for the nomination.

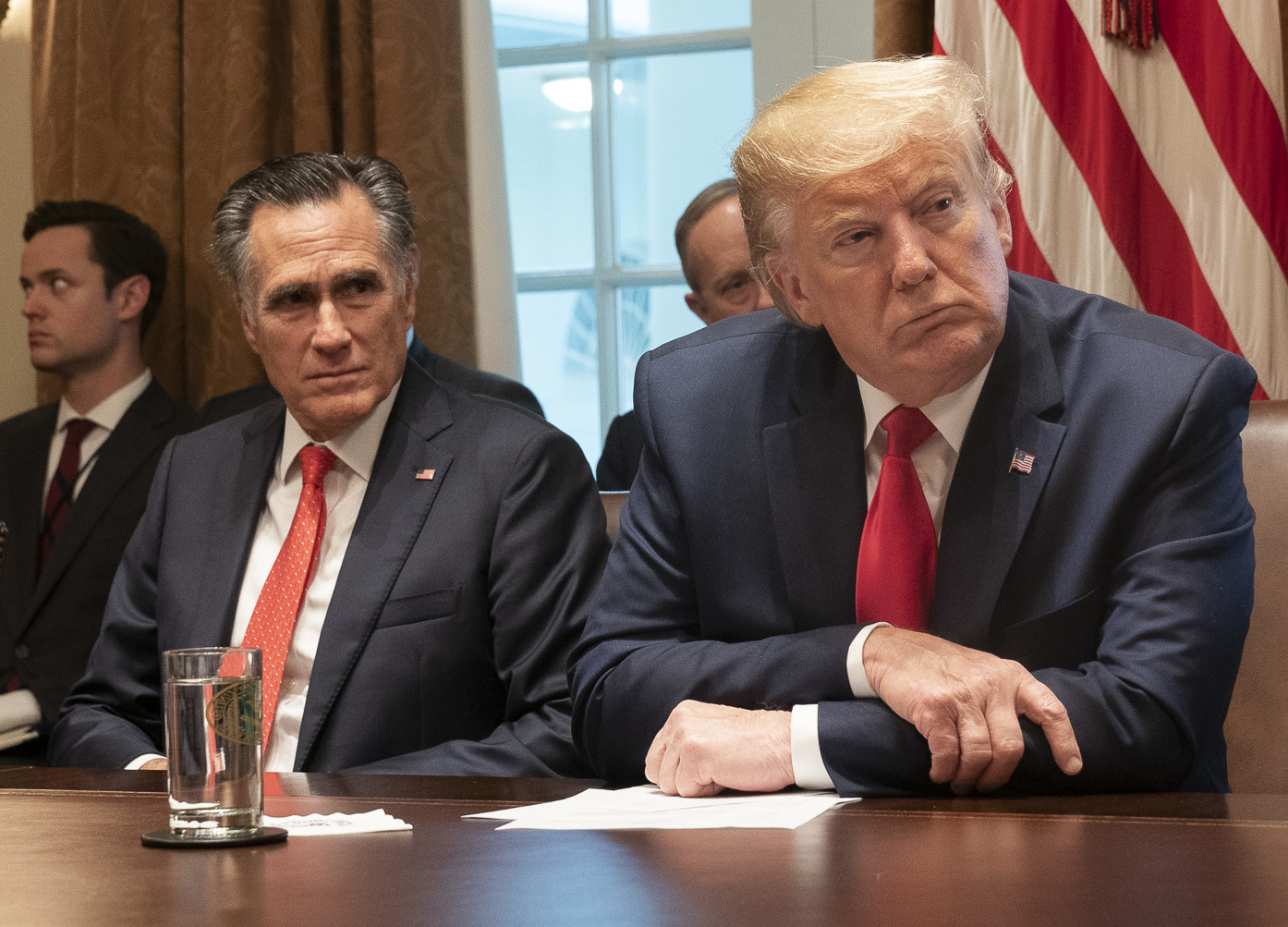
Romney with President Donald Trump during a White House listening session on the youth vaping and electronic cigarette epidemic in 2019

Romney encouraged Republicans to engage in tactical voting, by supporting whichever of the remaining rivals had the best chance to beat Trump in any given state. As such, Romney announced he was voting for, although not endorsing, Ted Cruz for president in the March 22 Utah caucus. As the race went on, there was some evidence that tactical voting was occurring, and some partial arrangements were formed among candidates, but by May 3, Trump had defeated all his opponents and became the party's presumptive nominee. Romney announced that he would not support Trump in the general election, saying, "I am dismayed at where we are now. I wish we had better choices."

In June, Romney said that he would not vote for Democratic nominee Hillary Clinton, saying: "It's a matter of personal conscience. I can't vote for either of those two people." He suggested that he might vote for a third-party candidate, or write in his wife's name, saying she would be "an ideal president". When pressed on which of Trump and Clinton was more qualified to be president, Romney quoted P. J. O'Rourke: "Hillary Clinton is wrong on every issue, but she's wrong within the normal parameters."

Romney considered voting for the Libertarian ticket of former Republican governors Gary Johnson and Bill Weld (the latter, like Romney, also a former governor of Massachusetts), saying that he would "get to know Gary Johnson better and see if he's someone who I could end up voting for", adding that "if Bill Weld were at the top of the ticket, it would be very easy for me to vote for Bill Weld for president." In September, he called for Johnson to be included in the presidential debates and in October it emerged that Independent candidate Evan McMullin was using an email list of 2.5 million Romney supporters to raise money. McMullin's chief strategist said that it was purchased from Romney for President and that "we'll let other folks discuss what that may mean and certainly never speak for [Romney]." A spokeswoman for Romney said that the list had been "rented by several political candidates in the presidential primary, and by countless other political and commercial users in the time since the 2012 campaign" and Romney made no public comment on McMullin's candidacy. Romney and his wife cast early ballots in Utah, but he declined to say who he voted for. In May 2018, Romney revealed that he had cast a write-in vote for his wife Ann.

After Trump won the election, Romney congratulated him by phone and on Twitter. On November 19, Romney met with him at the Trump National Golf Club in Bedminster, New Jersey, reportedly to discuss the position of Secretary of State, which ultimately went to Rex Tillerson. In February 2017, Romney said that Trump was "off to a very strong start" in fulfilling his campaign promises, although he had "no regrets" about his anti-Trump speech. The next year, Trump endorsed Romney's 2018 senate campaign.

=== 2018 Utah U.S. Senate campaign ===
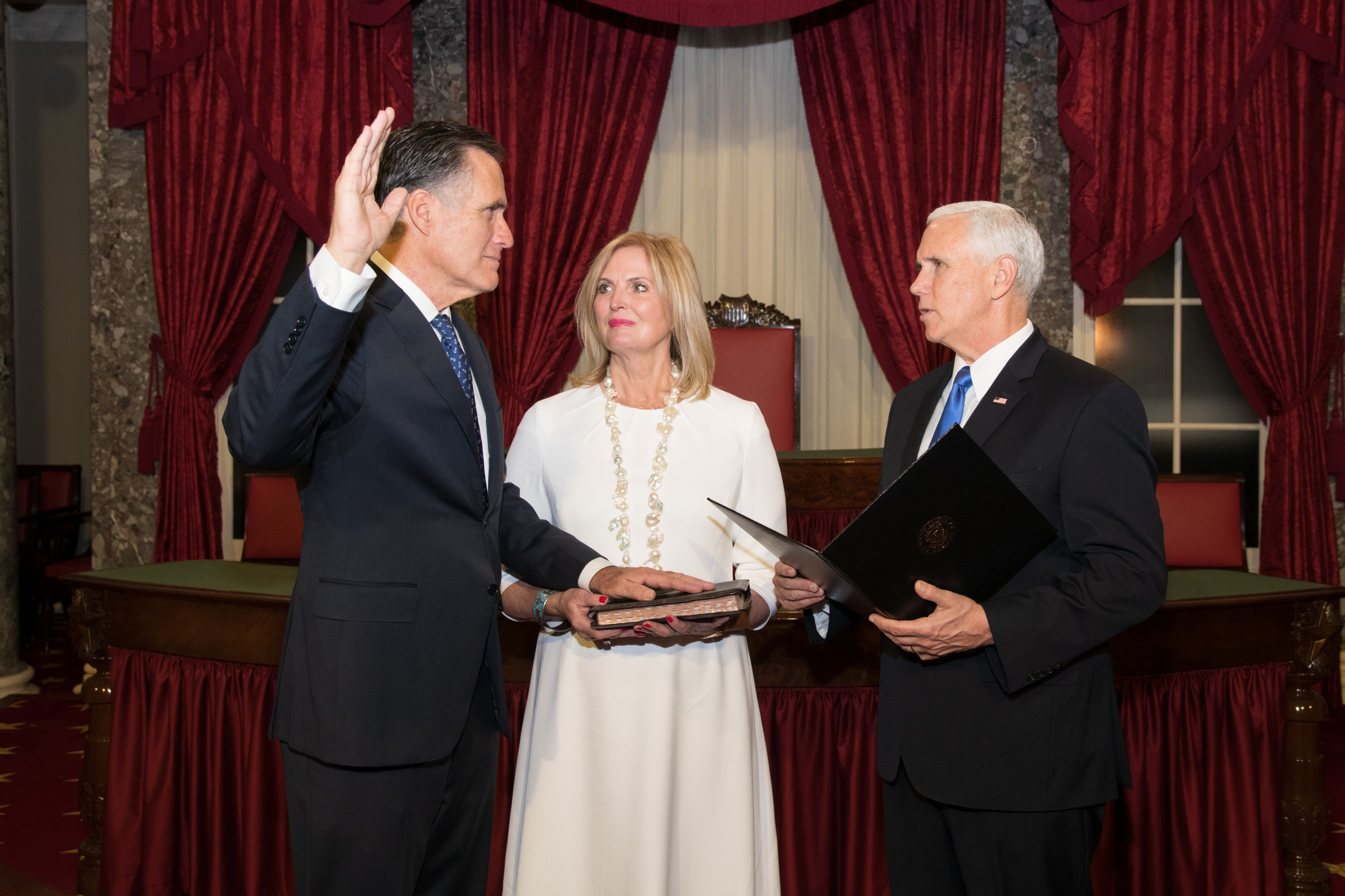
Romney being sworn in as Senator from Utah by Vice President Mike Pence

September and October 2017 press reports said that should U.S. Senator Orrin Hatch retire, Romney would run for that seat in 2018. On January 2, 2018, after Hatch announced that he would retire, many speculated that he was considering a Senate campaign. On February 16, 2018, Romney formally launched his campaign with a video message posted on Facebook and Twitter.

At the state Republican nominating convention held on April 21, 2018, Romney received 1,585 delegate votes (49.1%), finishing second to State Representative Mike Kennedy, with 1,642 delegate votes (50.9%). Since neither Romney nor Kennedy garnered the 60% of delegate votes necessary to claim the endorsement, they competed in a June 26 primary election. In the primary, Romney defeated Kennedy, 71.7–28.3%.

Romney was elected U.S. senator from Utah on November 6, defeating Democratic nominee Jenny Wilson, 62.6% to 30.9%.

With his election, Romney became the third person to have served as governor of one state and senator from another state. (The other two were William W. Bibb, who served as a U.S. senator from Georgia and then the first governor of Alabama, and Sam Houston, who was the sixth governor of Tennessee before becoming a U.S. senator from Texas.)

== U.S. Senate (2019–2025) ==
=== Tenure ===
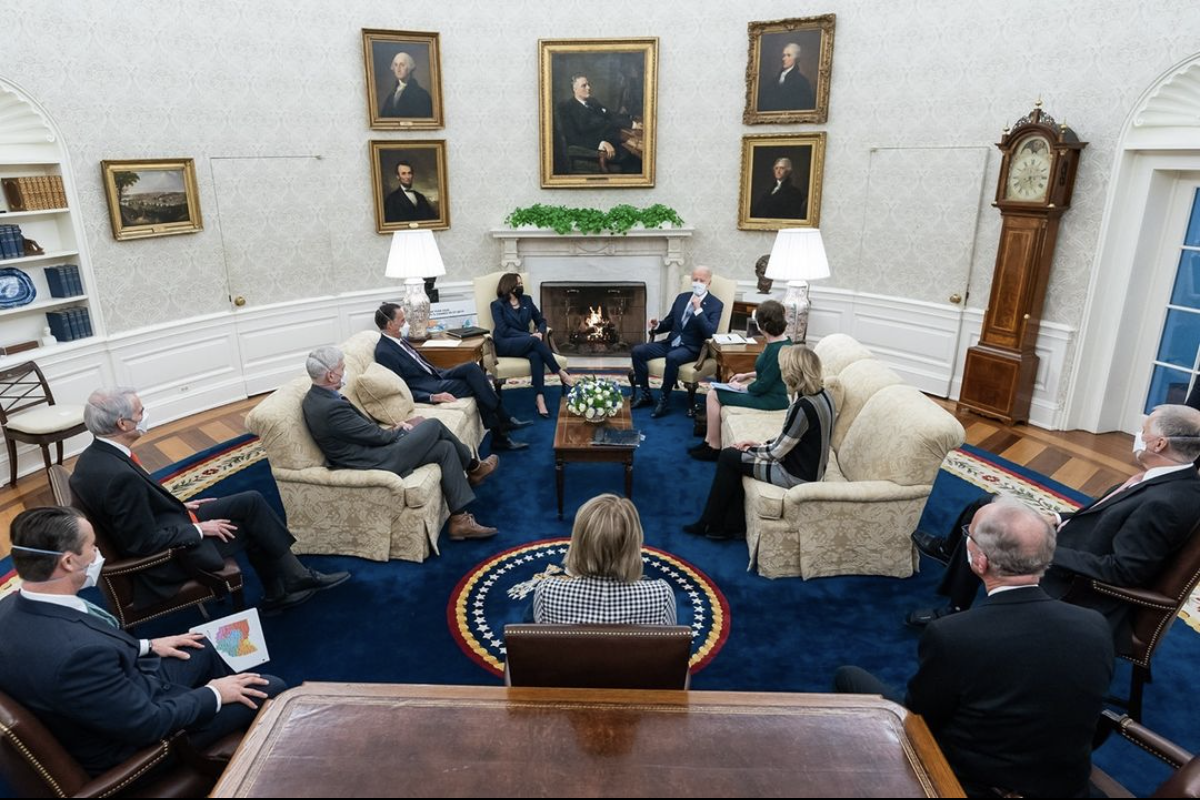
Romney and other Republican Senators meet with President Joe Biden to discuss COVID-19 relief in February 2021.

Shortly before assuming office, Romney wrote a Washington Post editorial strongly criticizing Trump's character. Ronna McDaniel, Romney's niece and the chair of the Republican National Committee, called his comments "disappointing and unproductive", while Trump wrote that he "[w]ould much prefer that Mitt focus on Border Security and so many other things where he can be helpful". By November 9, 2019, Romney was just one of three Republican senators, along with Susan Collins of Maine and Lisa Murkowski of Alaska, who declined to co-sponsor a resolution opposing the impeachment inquiry process into Trump. He was one of two Republicans (with Collins) who joined all Democrats voting to allow impeachment witnesses.

Romney condemned the 2019 Sri Lanka Easter bombings, saying: "As we celebrate the miracle of Easter, we hold in our hearts the victims of the senseless violence in Sri Lanka and their loved ones."

After many called for Representative George Santos to step down after being investigated by the House Ethics Committee, Romney confronted Santos during President Biden's 2023 State of the Union Address, saying he "shouldn't be in Congress".

==== Social media ====
In the October 2019 issue of The Atlantic, Romney revealed that he used a secret Twitter account to keep tabs on political conversation there, saying, "What do they call me, a lurker?" Shortly thereafter, Slate found a Twitter account with the name Pierre Delecto. The account was registered in July 2011, followed about 700 people, and had eight followers at the time it was discovered. It had tweeted 10 times, always in reply to other tweets. The next day, Romney confirmed ownership of the account.

==== First impeachment of Donald Trump (2019–2020) ====
"Full Remarks – Senator Mitt Romney to vote to convict President Trump on Abuse of Power" – video from C-SPAN

On February 5, 2020, after Romney read a prepared text on the Senate floor decrying "corrupting an election to keep oneself in office" as "perhaps the most abusive and destructive violation of one's oath of office that I can imagine", he broke ranks with the Republican majority as the sole Republican senator to vote to convict Trump in his first impeachment trial, thereby becoming, according to press reports, the first U.S. senator in United States history to vote to convict a president of the same political party.

Fallout from the vote included Romney's being formally censured by various Republican organizations outside of Utah; in comparison, anger against Romney among Republicans within Utah was more muted, and his impeachment vote, according to opinion polling, was supported by Utah Democrats. Jason Perry, director of the University of Utah's Hinckley Institute of Politics, said, "Democrats in Utah were more excited about Mitt Romney's vote than [Utah] Republicans were disappointed." Republicans for the Rule of Law ran various ads thanking Romney.

==== March with Black Lives Matter ====
On June 7, 2020, in response to the murder of George Floyd and the worldwide protests against police brutality, Romney became the first Republican senator to participate in a protest alongside Black Lives Matter. He said, "We need many voices against racism and against brutality, and we need to make sure that people understand that Black Lives Matter." This act drew praise and admiration from the left and right, with some Republicans questioning why other congressional Republicans were not showing support for the movement. On Twitter, Senator Kamala Harris praised Romney's actions, saying, "We need more of this." Trump mocked Romney, saying, "Tremendous sincerity, what a guy. Hard to believe, with this kind of political talent, his numbers would 'tank' so badly in Utah!"

==== 2020 presidential election ====
Romney did not endorse Trump's 2020 reelection campaign and told reporters that he did not vote for him. In a Washington Post op-ed, Romney wrote that Trump "has not risen to the mantle of the office". After the victory of Joe Biden and his running mate, Kamala Harris, Romney was the first Republican senator to extend his congratulations to them.

==== 2021 U.S. Capitol attack ====
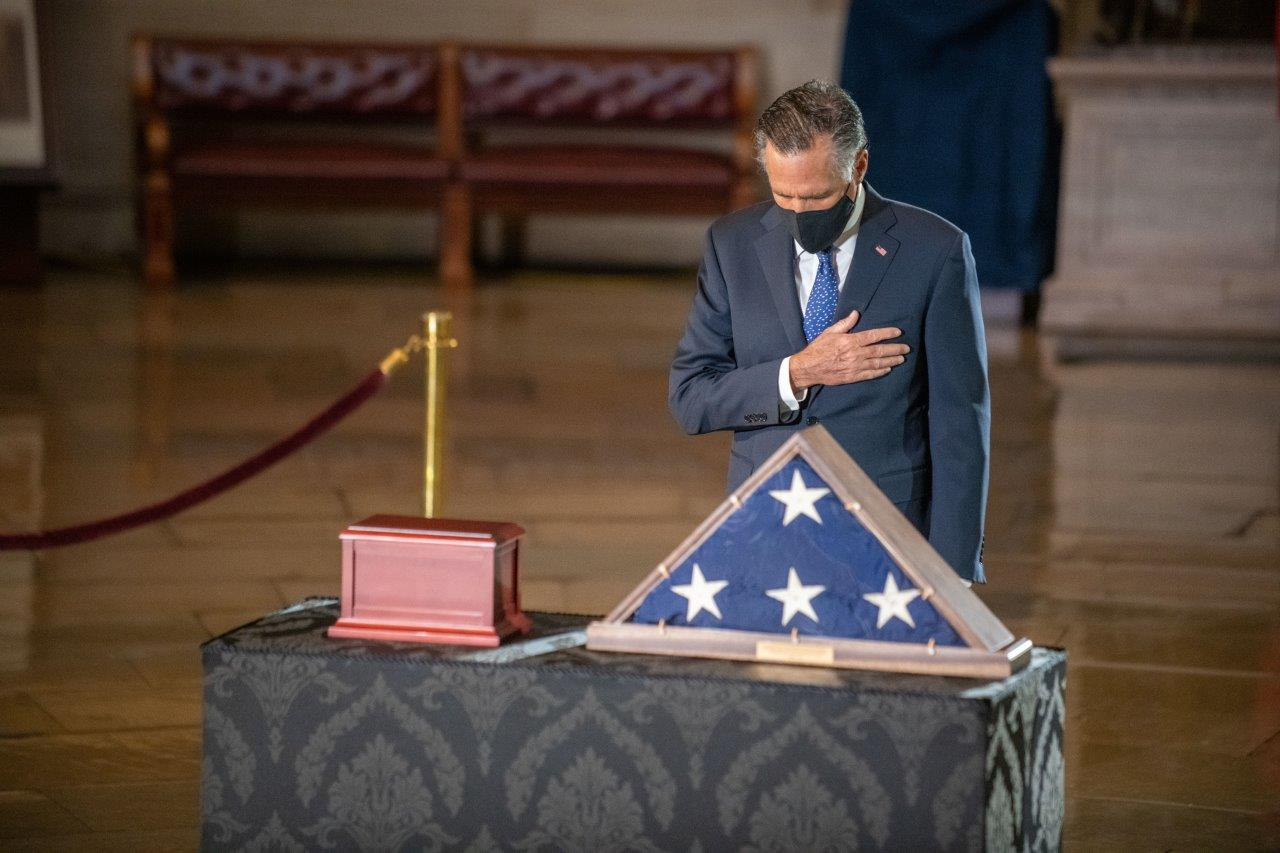
Romney pays tribute to Officer Brian Sicknick.

On the morning of January 5, 2021, Romney was heckled and harassed at the airport on his way to Washington, D.C., to certify Joe Biden's election win in the Senate. Cellphone footage of the incident showed Trump supporters accusing Romney of not supporting Trump's baseless claims of election fraud, and chanting "Traitor! Traitor! Traitor!" as Romney boarded his flight.

On the morning of January 6, protesters assembled at the "Save America" rally on the Ellipse, where Trump, Donald Trump Jr., Rudy Giuliani, and several members of Congress addressed the crowd fueling the conspiracy theories about election fraud. Later that day, while the Senate was in session certifying the 2021 United States Electoral College vote count within the United States Capitol, hundreds of Trump supporters violently attacked the Capitol, where they looted senators' offices and broke into the chamber of the United States Senate. Police evacuated the senators and Vice President Mike Pence to an undisclosed area. As they were evacuating Romney, he yelled at Ted Cruz and other Republican congressmen, "This is what you've gotten, guys!" According to New York Times reporter Jonathan Martin, Romney told him with "fury in his voice", "This is what the president has caused today, this insurrection!" Romney fully rebuked Trump and condemned the actions of the attackers. Later that night, when Congress had reconvened, Romney said on the Senate floor:

We gather today due to a selfish man's injured pride and the outrage of his supporters whom he has deliberately misinformed for the past two months and stirred to action this very morning ... Those who choose to continue to support his dangerous gambit by objecting to the results of a legitimate, democratic election will forever be seen as being complicit in an unprecedented attack against our democracy ... They will be remembered for their role in this shameful episode in American history. That will be their legacy…The best way we can show respect for the voters who are upset is by telling them the truth! That is the burden, and the duty, of leadership. The truth is that President-elect Biden won the election. President Trump lost. I've had that experience myself. It's no fun.

On February 10, 2021, new video was released during Trump's second impeachment trial that showed capitol police officer Eugene Goodman saving Romney from running into the Capitol rioters. During a break in the hearing, Romney said, "It was very troubling seeing the great violence the capitol police were subjected to." Romney also said he didn't know how close he was and didn't know it had been Goodman who diverted him away from the rioters, but that he looked forward to thanking Goodman.

On May 27, 2021, along with five other Republicans and all present Democrats, Romney voted to establish a bipartisan commission to investigate the January 6 attack. The vote failed for lack of 60 required "yes" votes.

==== Second impeachment of Donald Trump (2021) ====
On January 13, 2021, the House voted to impeach Trump a second time for incitement of insurrection. On January 26, Republican senator Rand Paul of Kentucky introduced a motion to dismiss the impeachment charge. The objection was defeated on a 55–45 vote; Romney was one of the five Republicans to vote against it.

On February 13, 2021, Romney and five other Republican senators voted to allow other witnesses in the impeachment trial. Later that day Romney voted to convict Trump for the second time along with six of his Republican colleagues. The final vote was 57 to convict and 43 to acquit. He wrote a statement that read in part:

President Trump attempted to corrupt the election by pressuring the Secretary of State of Georgia to falsify the election results in his state. President Trump incited the insurrection against Congress by using the power of his office to summon his supporters to Washington on January 6th and urging them to march on the Capitol during the counting of electoral votes. He did this despite the obvious and well known threats of violence that day. President Trump also violated his oath of office by failing to protect the Capitol, the Vice President, and others in the Capitol. Each and every one of these conclusions compels me to support conviction.

==== Second presidency of Donald Trump ====
In December 2025, Romney expressed in a New York Times editorial that the affluent must contribute more in taxes to tackle the escalating national debt. He argued that merely reducing spending is insufficient, and to avert the United States from approaching a "fiscal cliff", it is essential to manage both expenditures and revenues—this includes increasing taxes on the wealthy. He has proposed that certain significant exemptions and "tax loopholes" should be eliminated.

=== Committee assignments ===
During the 117th Congress, Romney sat on the following committees:

- Committee on Foreign Relations
  - Subcommittee on East Asia, the Pacific and International Cybersecurity Policy (Ranking Member)
  - Subcommittee on Europe and Regional Security Cooperation
  - Subcommittee on Near East, South Asia, Central Asia and Counterterrorism
- Committee on Homeland Security and Governmental Affairs
  - Subcommittee on Emerging Threats and Spending Oversight
  - Subcommittee on Governmental Operations and Border Management
- Committee on Budget (2021–present)
- Committee on Health, Education, Labor, and Pensions
  - Subcommittee on Children and Families
  - Subcommittee on Employment and Workplace Safety

== Political positions ==
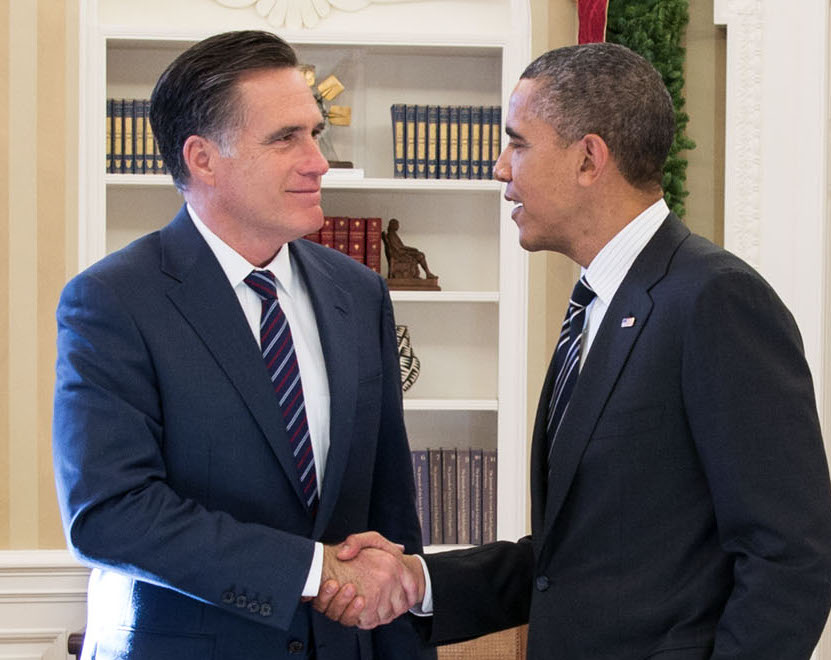
Romney meeting with President Obama after the 2012 presidential election

In addition to calling for cuts in federal government spending to help reduce the national debt, Romney proposed measures intended to limit the growth of entitlement programs, such as introducing means testing and gradually raising the eligibility ages for receipt of Social Security and Medicare. He supported substantial increases in military spending and promised to invest more heavily in military weapons programs while increasing the number of active-duty military personnel. He was very supportive of the directions taken by the budget proposals of Paul Ryan, though he later proposed his own budget plan.

Romney pledged to lead an effort to repeal the Patient Protection and Affordable Care Act ("Obamacare") and replace it with a system that gives states more control over Medicaid and makes health insurance premiums tax-advantaged for individuals in the same way they are for businesses. He favored repeal of the Dodd–Frank Wall Street Reform and Consumer Protection Act and the Sarbanes–Oxley Act and intended to replace them with what he called a "streamlined, modern regulatory framework".

He also promised to seek income tax law changes that he said would help to lower federal deficits and would stimulate economic growth. These included reducing individual income tax rates across the board by 20%, maintaining the Bush administration-era tax rate of 15% on investment income from dividends and capital gains (and eliminating this tax entirely for those with annual incomes less than $200,000), cutting the top tax rate on corporations from 35% to 25%, and eliminating the estate tax and the Alternative Minimum Tax. He promised that the loss of government revenue from these tax cuts would be offset by closing loopholes and placing limits on tax deductions and credits available to taxpayers with the highest incomes, but said that details would have to be worked out with Congress.

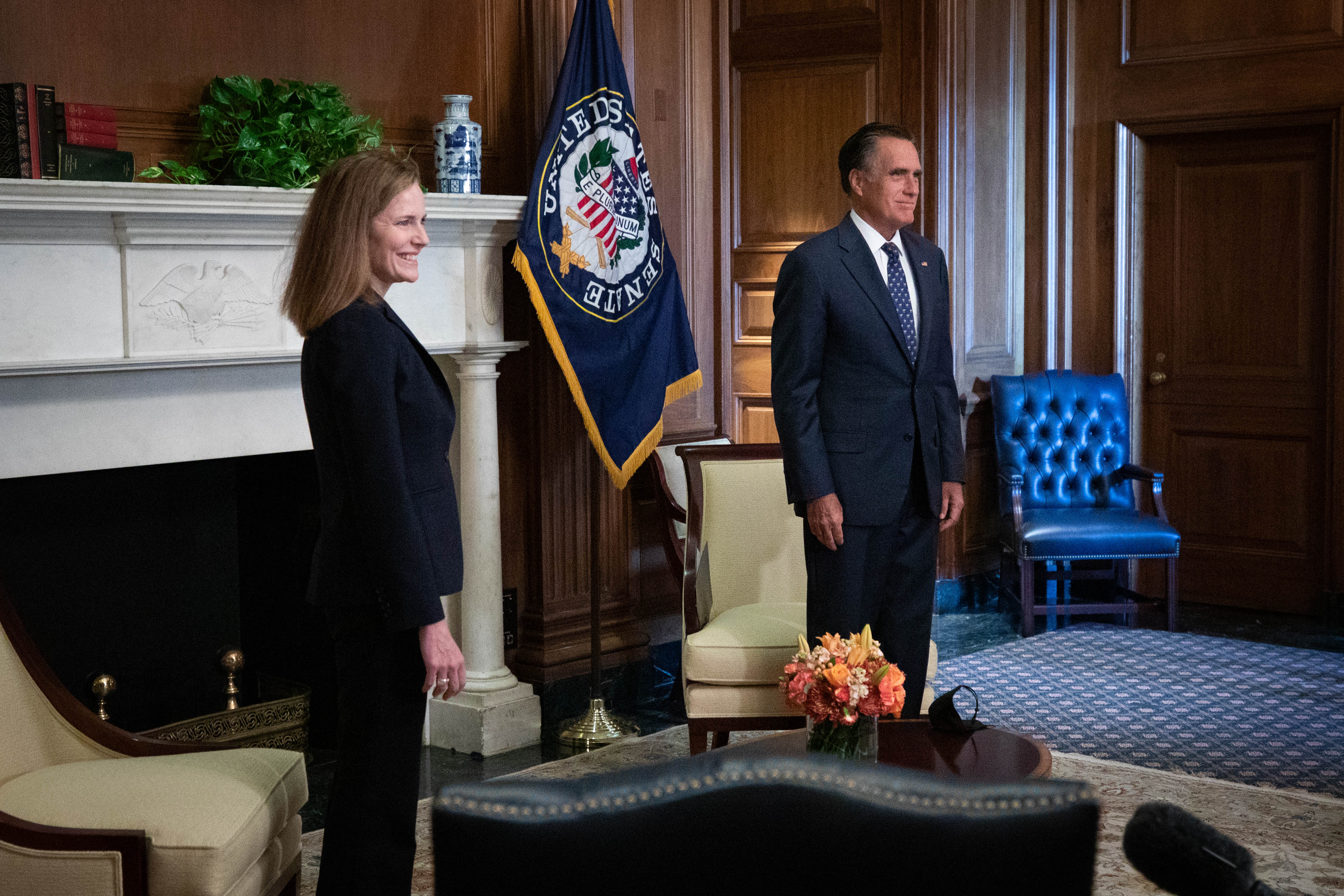
Romney said he would support President Donald Trump's Supreme Court nominee Amy Coney Barrett.

Romney opposed the use of mandatory limits on greenhouse gas emissions to deal with global warming. He stated that he believed climate change is occurring, but that he did not know how much of it could be linked to human activity. He was a proponent of increased domestic oil drilling, hydraulic fracturing ("fracking"), building more nuclear power plants, and reducing the regulatory authority of the Environmental Protection Agency.

Romney called Russia America's "number one geopolitical foe", a position many ridiculed him for, including former secretary of state Madeleine Albright, who later publicly apologized to him. He has asserted that preventing Iran from obtaining nuclear capability should be America's "highest national security priority". Romney stated his strong support for Israel. He planned to formally label China a currency manipulator and take associated counteractions unless China changed its trade practices. Romney supported the Patriot Act, the continued operation of the Guantanamo Bay detention camp, and use of enhanced interrogation techniques against suspected terrorists. He described same-sex marriage as a "state issue" while running for Senate in 1994 and opposed a constitutional ban on same-sex marriage in 2002. Romney opposed same-sex marriage and civil unions, but favored domestic partnership legislation that gives certain legal rights to same-sex couples. In 2011, he signed a pledge promising to seek passage of a constitutional amendment to define marriage as the union of one man and one woman. In 2022, Romney reversed his previous position on federal marriage, and was one of 12 Republicans voting to advance legislation to codify same-sex marriage into federal law by voting for the Respect for Marriage Act.

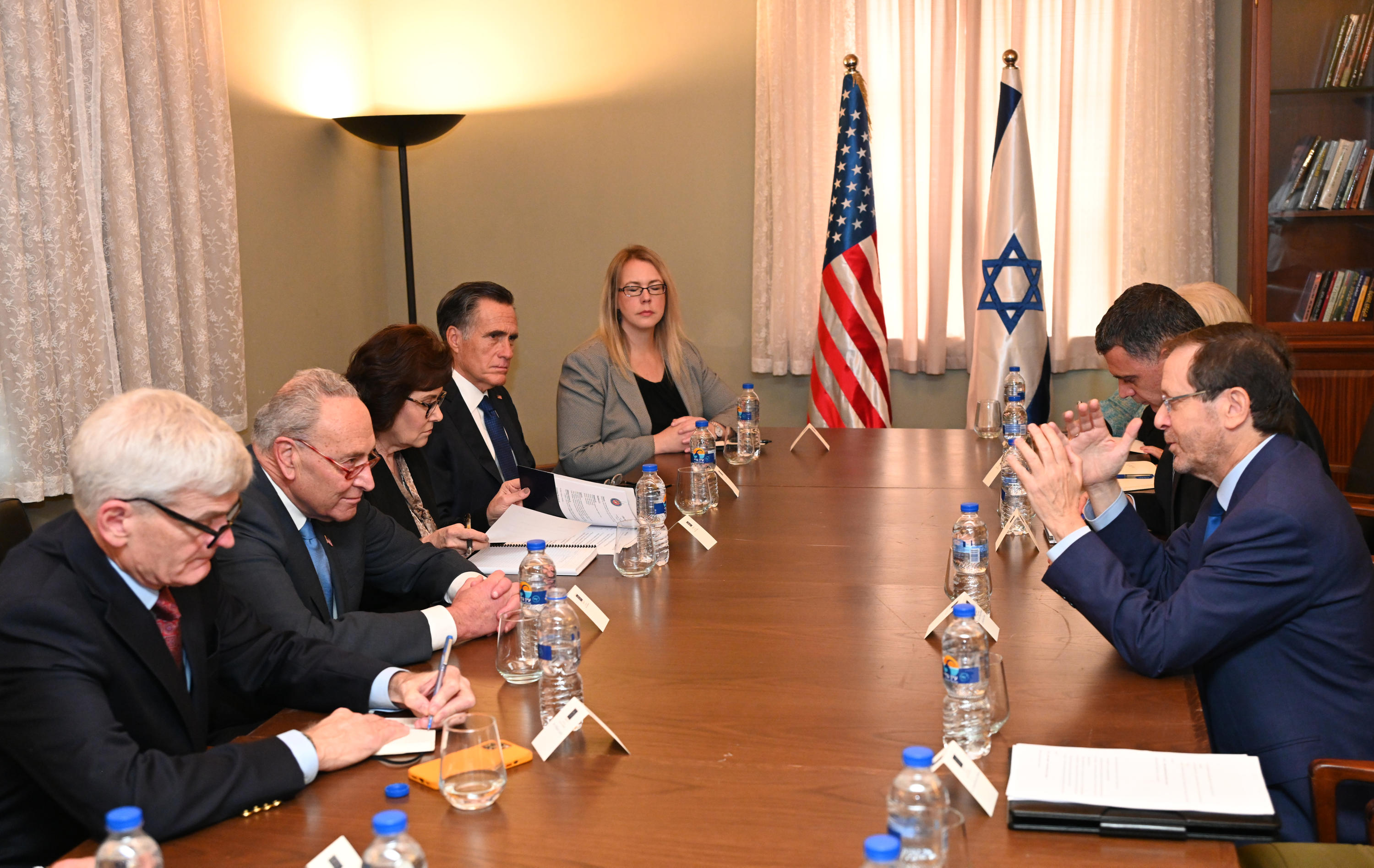
Romney and Chuck Schumer with Israeli President Isaac Herzog in Tel Aviv during the Gaza war on October 15, 2023

Since 2005, Romney has described himself as "pro-life". That year, he wrote: "I believe that abortion is the wrong choice except in cases of incest, rape, and to save the life of the mother." During his 1994 Senate campaign, Romney had said, "I believe that abortion should be safe and legal in this country", a stance he reiterated during his 2002 campaign for governor. While Romney would prefer to see passage of a constitutional amendment that would outlaw abortion, he did not believe the public would support such an amendment; as an alternative, he promised to nominate Supreme Court justices who would help overturn Roe v. Wade, allowing each state to decide on the legality of abortion. His earlier pro-abortion rights stance in particular and support for some gay rights and gun restrictions as governor of Massachusetts earned him the criticism of some conservatives; the conservative magazine Human Events labeled him one of the top ten RINOs in 2005.

Romney said he would appoint federal judges in the mold of U.S. Supreme Court justices John Roberts, Clarence Thomas, Antonin Scalia, and Samuel Alito. He advocated judicial restraint and strict constructionism as judicial philosophies.

Romney declared his support for the Black Lives Matter international human rights movement by attending the rally, and then joining the Faith Works march, on June 7, 2020.

In July 2020, Romney, along with Pat Toomey, was one of two Republican U.S. Senators who condemned Trump's decision to commute the sentence of Roger Stone, which Romney described as "Unprecedented, historic corruption: an American president commutes the sentence of a person convicted by a jury of lying to shield that very president." In September 2020, Romney said the Republicans' decision to nominate and confirm Amy Coney Barrett as an associate justice of the Supreme Court of the United States before the 2020 presidential election was fair: "the circumstance where a nominee of a president is from a different party than the Senate then, more often than not, the Senate does not confirm. So the Garland decision was consistent with that. On the other hand, when there's a nominee of a party that is in the same party as the Senate, then typically they do confirm."

In June 2024, Romney proposed a framework to mitigate the existential risk from artificial general intelligence along with senators Jack Reed, Jerry Moran, and Angus King. Romney said he would like to see regulation that "would restrict the types of actions that could lead to existential, or health, or other serious consequences".

On July 21, 2024, when President Biden dropped out of the 2024 presidential election, Romney posted a statement which read: "Others will judge his presidency. However, having worked with him these past few years, I respect President Biden. His decision to withdraw from the race was right and is in the best interest of the country."

== Awards and honors ==
=== Honorary degrees ===
Date	School	Degree
1999	University of Utah	Doctorate of Business
2002	Bentley College	Doctor of Law
2004	Suffolk University Law School	Doctor of Public Administration
2007	Hillsdale College	Doctorate in Public Service
2012	Liberty University	Doctor of Humanities
2013	Southern Virginia University	Honorary Doctorate
2015	Jacksonville University	Honorary Doctorate
2015	Utah Valley University	Doctorate of Business
2015	Saint Anselm College	Honorary Doctorate

=== Non-academic awards and honors ===
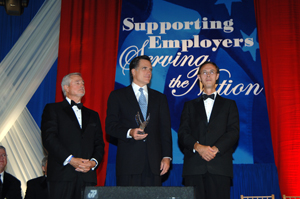
Receiving the 2006 Secretary of Defense Employer Support Freedom Award on behalf of his state

People magazine included Romney in its 50 Most Beautiful People list for 2002, and in 2004, a foundation that promotes the Olympic truce gave him its inaugural Truce Ideal Award. The Cranbrook School gave him its Distinguished Alumni Award in 2005. In 2008, he shared with his wife Ann the Canterbury Medal from the Becket Fund for Religious Liberty, for "refus[ing] to compromise their principles and faith" during the presidential campaign. In 2012, Time magazine included Romney in their List of The 100 Most Influential People in the World.

In 2021, Romney received the Profile in Courage Award for being the only member of his party to vote to convict Donald Trump during his first impeachment trial.

In 2024, Romney received the annual Legislative Achievement Award from the National Emergency Management Association for his efforts in creating the Wildland Fire Mitigation and Management Commission in Utah.

== Works ==
- Romney, Mitt; Robinson, Timothy (2004). Turnaround: Crisis, Leadership, and the Olympic Games. Washington: Regnery Publishing. ISBN 978-0-89526-084-0.
- Romney, Mitt (2010). No Apology: The Case for American Greatness. New York: St. Martin's Press. ISBN 978-0-312-60980-1.
- Romney, Mitt; Romney, Ann (2019). Simple Truths for an Abundant Life: From One Generation to Another. Salt Lake City: Deseret Book. ISBN 978-1-62972-590-1.

== See also ==
- List of governors of Massachusetts
- List of United States senators from Utah
- List of United States Republican Party presidential tickets
- President of the Organising Committee for the Olympic Games

== Bibliography ==
- Balz, Dan; Johnson, Haynes (2009). The Battle for America, 2008: The Story of an Extraordinary Election. New York: Viking Penguin. ISBN 978-0-670-02111-6.
- Barone, Michael; Cohen, Richard E. (2004). The Almanac of American Politics 2004 (paperback). Washington: National Journal Group. ISBN 978-0-89234-106-1.
- Barone, Michael; Cohen, Richard E. (2006). The Almanac of American Politics 2006. Washington: National Journal Group. ISBN 978-0-89234-111-5.
- Barone, Michael; Cohen, Richard E. (2008). The Almanac of American Politics 2008 (paperback). Washington: National Journal Group. ISBN 978-0-89234-116-0.
- Canellos, Peter S.; The Team at The Boston Globe, eds. (2009). The Last Lion: The Fall and Rise of Ted Kennedy. New York: Simon & Schuster. ISBN 978-1-4391-3817-5.
- Clymer, Adam (1999). Edward M. Kennedy: A Biography. New York: Wm. Morrow & Company. ISBN 978-0-688-14285-8.
- Heilemann, John; Halperin, Mark (2010). Game Change: Obama and the Clintons, McCain and Palin, and the Race of a Lifetime. New York: HarperCollins. ISBN 978-0-06-173363-5.
- Hersh, Burton (1997). The Shadow President: Ted Kennedy in Opposition. South Royalton, Vermont: Steerforth Press. ISBN 978-1-883642-30-3.
- Hewitt, Hugh (2007). A Mormon in the White House?: 10 Things Every American Should Know About Mitt Romney. Washington: Regnery Publishing. ISBN 978-1-59698-502-5.
- Kranish, Michael; Helman, Scott (2012). The Real Romney. New York: HarperCollins. ISBN 978-0-06-212327-5.
- Mahoney, Tom (1960). The Story of George Romney: Builder, Salesman, Crusader. New York: Harper & Brothers. OCLC 236830.
- Thomas, Evan (2009). "A Long Time Coming": The Inspiring, Combative 2008 Campaign and the Historic Election of Barack Obama. New York: PublicAffairs. ISBN 978-1-58648-607-5.

== Further reading and viewing ==
- Coppins, McKay (2023). Romney: A Reckoning. New York: Scribner. ISBN 9781982196202. OCLC 1394141101.
- Foster, Craig (2008). A Different God?: Mitt Romney, the Religious Right, and the Mormon Question. Draper, Utah: Greg Kofford Books. ISBN 978-1-58958-117-3.
- Hines, Phillip (2012). Mitt Romney in His Own Words. New York: Threshold Editions. ISBN 978-1-4516-8780-4.
- Scott, Ronald B. (2011). Mitt Romney: An Inside Look at the Man and His Politics. Guilford, Connecticut: Lyons Press. ISBN 978-0-7627-7927-7.
- Turner, Lisa Ray; Field, Kimberly (2007). Mitt Romney: The Man, His Values, and His Vision. Silverton, Idaho: Mapletree Publishing. ISBN 978-1-60065-109-0.
- Whiteley, Greg (2014). Mitt – A Netflix original documentary (documentary film). Netflix.

Business positions
New office	Chief Executive Officer of Bain Capital; 1984–2002	Position abolished
Preceded by Bill Bain	Chief Executive Officer of Bain and Company; 1991–1992	Succeeded by Steve Ellis as Worldwide Managing Director of Bain and Company
Preceded by Bill Bain	Chief Executive Officer of Bain and Company; 1991–1992	Succeeded by Orit Gadiesh as Chair of Bain and Company
Party political offices
Preceded by Joe Malone	Republican nominee for U.S. Senator from Massachusetts (Class 1); 1994	Succeeded by Jack Robinson
Preceded by Paul Cellucci	Republican nominee for Governor of Massachusetts; 2002	Succeeded by Kerry Healey
Preceded by Kenny Guinn	Chair of the Republican Governors Association; 2005–2006	Succeeded by Sonny Perdue
Preceded by John McCain	Republican nominee for President of the United States; 2012	Succeeded by Donald Trump
Preceded by Orrin Hatch	Republican nominee for U.S. Senator from Utah (Class 1); 2018	Succeeded by John Curtis
Sporting positions
Preceded by Eishiro Saito	President of the Organising Committee for Winter Olympic Games; 2002	Succeeded by Valentino Castellani
Political offices
Preceded by Jane Swift; Acting	Governor of Massachusetts; 2003–2007	Succeeded by Deval Patrick
U.S. Senate
Preceded by Orrin Hatch	United States Senator (Class 1) from Utah; 2019–2025; Served alongside: Mike Lee	Succeeded by John Curtis
U.S. order of precedence (ceremonial)
Preceded by Heidi Heitkamp as Former U.S. Senator	Order of precedence of the United States as Former U.S. Senator	Succeeded by Harrison Schmitt as Former U.S. Senator
