= Political positions of Barack Obama =

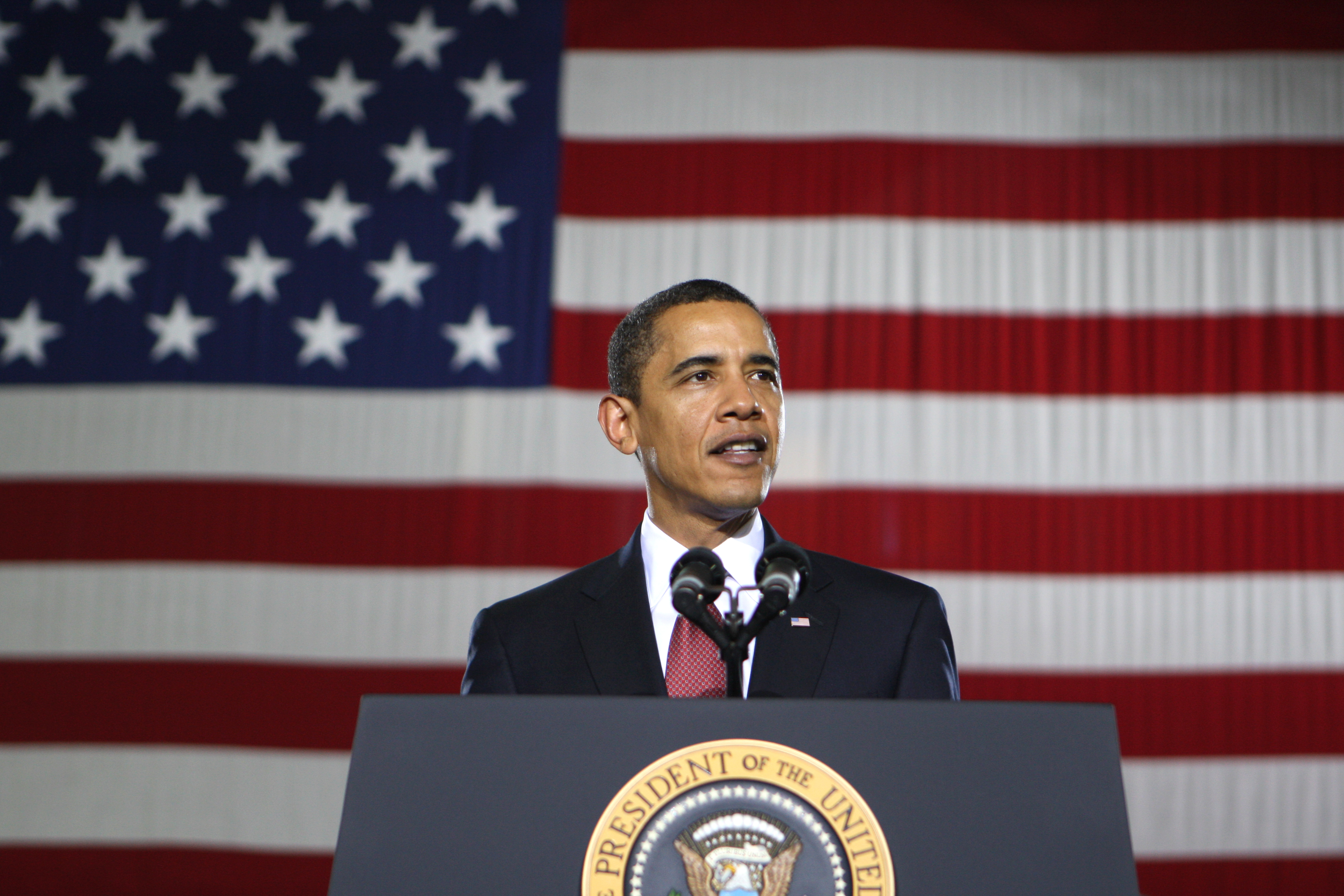
Obama delivering a speech at Marine Corps Base Camp Lejeune in 2009

Barack Obama, the 44th President of the United States from 2009 to 2017, served as a U.S. senator from Illinois from 2005 to 2008 and as an Illinois state senator from 1997 to 2004. A member of the Democratic Party, he made his presidential run in 2008. He was elected president in 2008 and re-elected in 2012.

Obama has declared his position on many political issues through his public comments and legislative records. The Obama Administration stated that its general agenda was to "revive the economy, provide affordable and accessible health care to all, strengthen our public education and social security systems, define a clear path to energy independence and tackle climate change, end the War in Iraq responsibly and finish our mission in Afghanistan, and work with our allies to prevent Iran from developing a nuclear weapon."

== Economic policy ==
President Obama was first inaugurated in January 2009, in the depths of the Great Recession and the subprime mortgage crisis that began in 2007. His presidency continued the Troubled Asset Relief Program and auto industry rescue begun during the Presidency of George W. Bush and immediately enacted an $800 billion stimulus program, the American Recovery and Reinvestment Act of 2009 (ARRA), which included a blend of additional spending and tax cuts. By early 2011, the economy began creating jobs consistently each month, a trend which continued through the end of his tenure.

Obama followed with the 2010 Affordable Care Act. By 2016, the law covered approximately 23 million people with health insurance via a combination of state healthcare exchanges and an extension of Medicaid. It lowered the rate of those without health insurance from approximately 16% in 2010 to 9% by 2015. Throughout his administration, healthcare costs continued moderating; for example, healthcare premiums for those covered by employers rose by 69% between 2000 and 2005, but only by 27% from 2010 to 2015. By 2017, nearly 70% of those on the exchanges could purchase insurance for less than $75 per month after subsidies. The law was evaluated multiple times by the Congressional Budget Office (CBO), which scored it as a moderate deficit reducer, as it included tax hikes primarily on high income taxpayers (roughly the Top 5%) and reductions in future Medicare cost increases, offsetting subsidy costs. No House Republicans, and only a few in the Senate, voted for the law.

To address the excesses in the banking sector that precipitated the 2008 financial crisis, Obama signed into law the Dodd–Frank Wall Street Reform and Consumer Protection Act in 2010, which limited bank risk-taking and overhauled the outdated regulatory regime ineffective in monitoring the non-depository or shadow banking sector at the core of the crisis, which had outgrown the traditional depository banking sector. The Act also created the Consumer Financial Protection Bureau, but did not breakup the largest banks (which had grown even larger due to forced mergers during the crisis) nor separate investment and depository banking, as the Glass–Steagall Act had done. Only a few Republicans voted for the law.

The Great Recession had caused federal government revenues to fall to their lowest level relative to the economy's size in 50 years. At the same time, safety net expenditures (including automatic stabilizers such as unemployment compensation and disability payments) and stimulus measures caused expenditures to rise considerably. This drove the United States federal budget deficit higher, creating significant debt concerns. This caused several bruising debates with the Republican Congress. President Obama signed the American Taxpayer Relief Act of 2012, which included the expiration of the Bush tax cuts for high income earners and implemented a sequester (cap) on spending for the military and other discretionary categories of spending. Compared against a baseline where the Bush tax cuts were allowed to expire on schedule in 2010 for all income levels, this law significantly increased future deficits. Compared against the previously years, it reduced the deficit and limited future cost increases. Along with the recovering economy, the law even lowered the deficit back to the historical average relative to GDP by 2014.

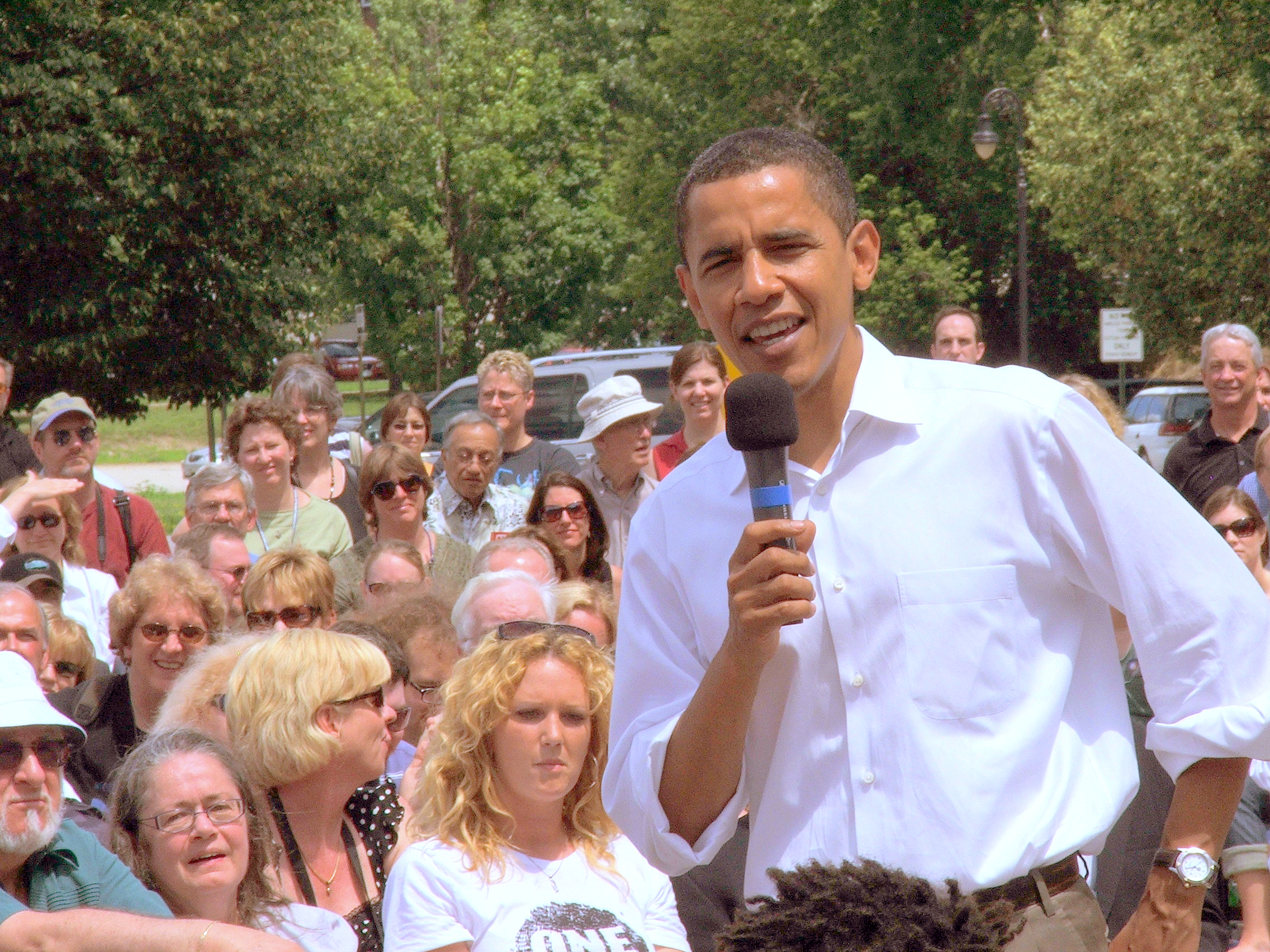
Barack Obama campaigning in New Hampshire, August 2007

With the economy recovering and major budget legislation behind him, President Obama began shifting to another priority: income and wealth inequality. From 1950 to 1979, the Top 1% earned roughly a 10% share of the income. However, this had risen to 24% by 2007, due to a combination of globalization, automation, and policy changes that had weakened workers' bargaining position in relation to capital (owners). He referred to the widening income gap as the "defining challenge of our time" during 2013. His tax increases on higher-income taxpayers lowered the share of after-tax income received by the Top 1% from 17% in 2007 to 12% by 2015, while job creation remained robust.

Wealth inequality had also risen similarly, with the share of wealth owned by the Top 1% rising from 24% in 1979 to 36% by 2007. While U.S. household net worth rose to nearly 30% from its pre-crisis peak from 2007 to 2016, much of this gain went to the wealthiest Americans, as it had before Obama became president. By 2015, the wealth share owned by the Top 1% reached 42%.

President Obama also tried addressing inequality before taxes (i.e., market income), with infrastructure investment to create middle-class jobs and a federally-mandated increase in the minimum wage. However, the Republican Congress defeated these initiatives, but many states actually did increase their minimum wages, due in part to his support.

== Energy policy ==
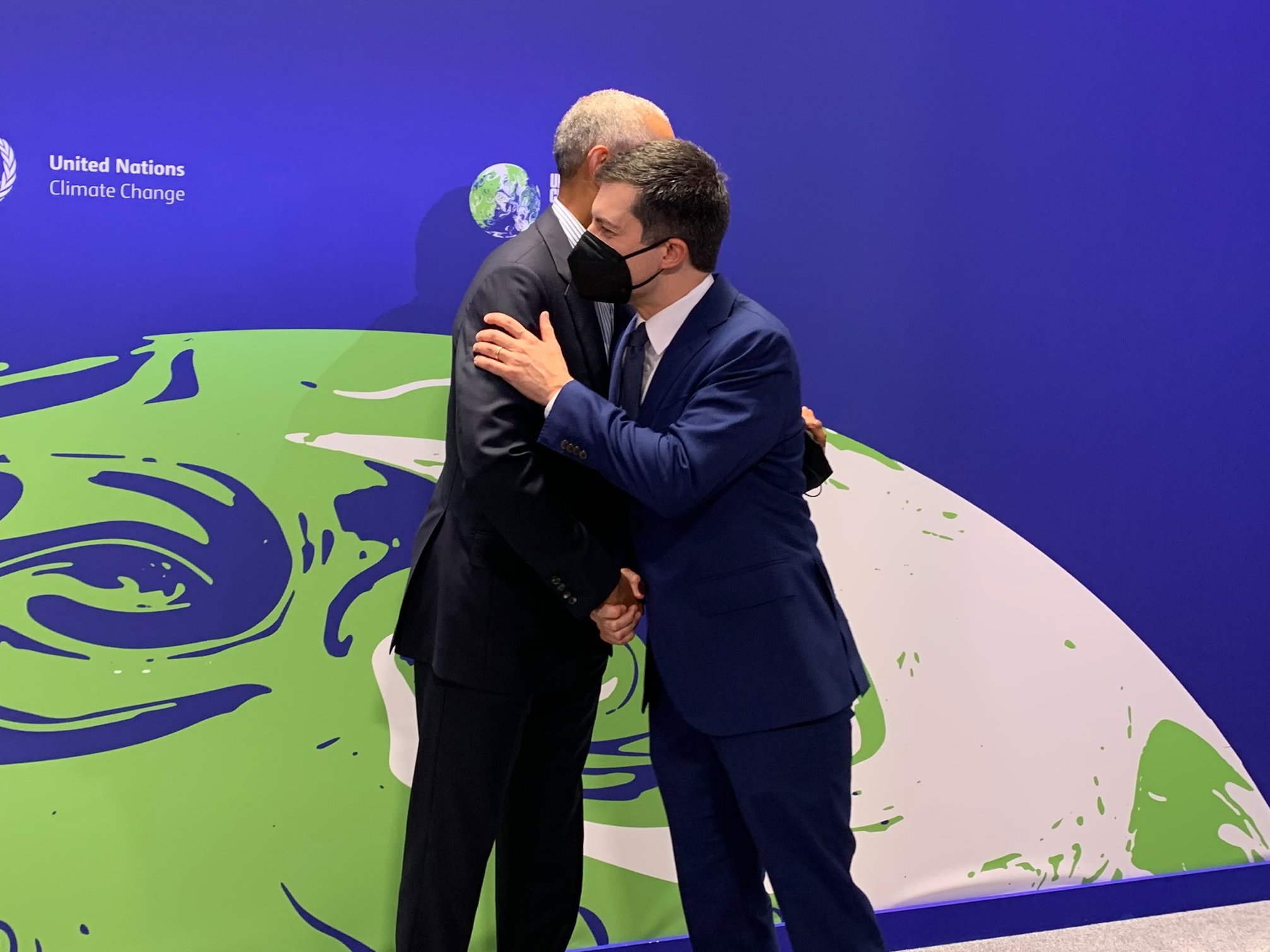
Obama and Pete Buttigieg at the COP26 climate summit in Glasgow on November 9, 2021

President Obama's energy policy can be understood by looking at the different investments in clean energy that was evident in the American Recovery and Reinvestment Act of 2009.

At Andrews Air Force base on March 31, 2010, President Obama announced a "Comprehensive Plan for Energy Security", stating that "moving towards clean energy is about our security. It's also about our economy. And it's about the future of our planet." His plan included raising fuel efficiency standards. He also announced a decision to double the number of hybrid vehicles in the federal government's fleet and one to expand domestic offshore oil and gas exploration in Alaska, the eastern Gulf of Mexico, and off the east coast of the United States.

== Disaster relief ==
Obama proposed cuts of $1 billion, or 3%, to the Federal Emergency Management Agency (FEMA) for 2013. More money would be given to state and local programs under Obama's proposal.

== Foreign policy ==
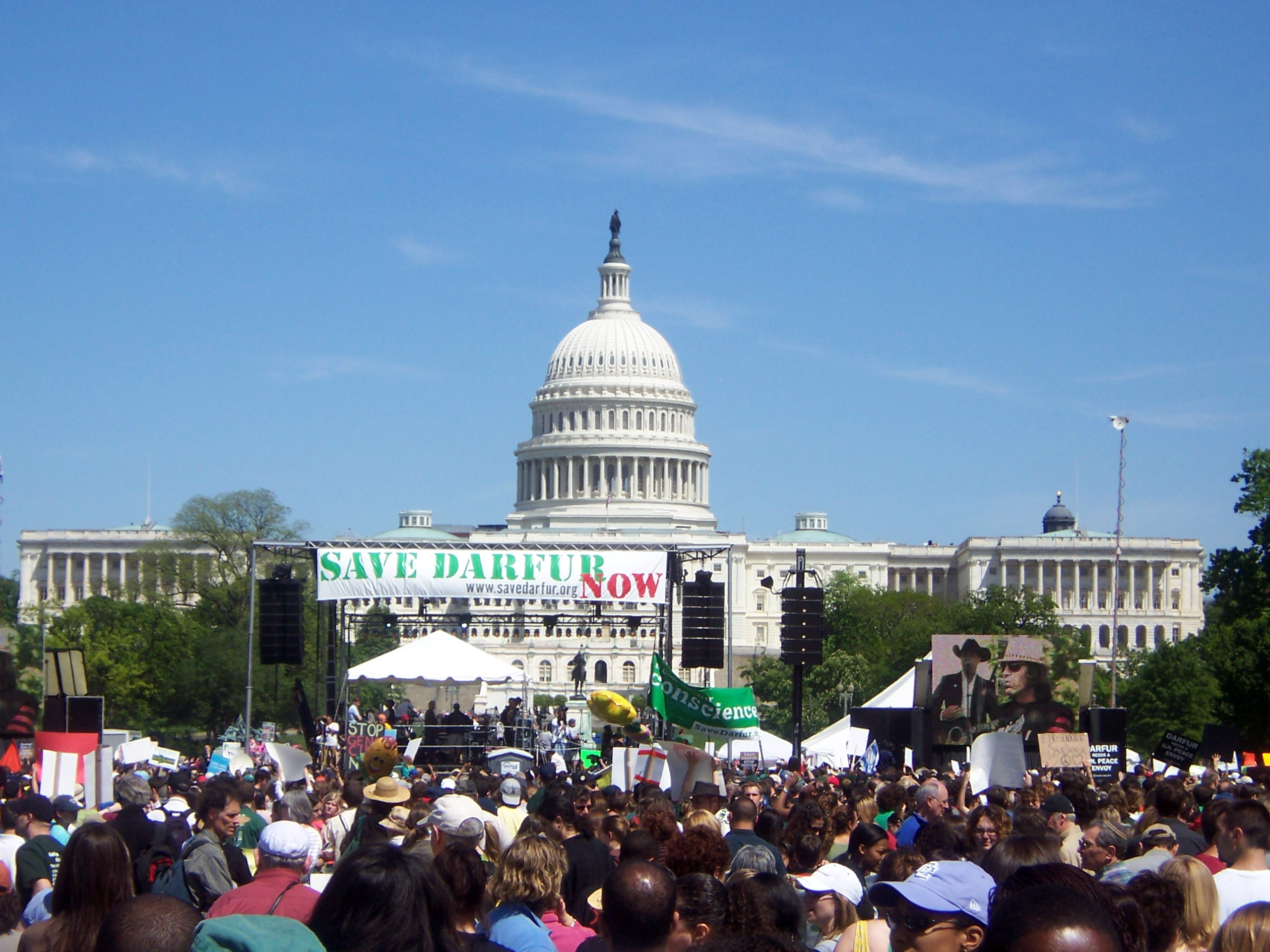
Obama addressing the Save Darfur rally at the National Mall in Washington, D.C., on April 30, 2006

Obama's overall foreign policy philosophy has been postulated as the "Obama Doctrine" by Washington Post columnist E. J. Dionne, which the columnist describes as "a form of realism unafraid to deploy American power but mindful that its use must be tempered by practical limits and a dose of self-awareness." An op-ed article in The New York Times by David Brooks identified Obama as a person having enormous respect for and being deeply influenced by the philosophy of Reinhold Niebuhr.

Obama's first major speech on foreign policy was delivered to the Chicago Council on Global Affairs on April 23, 2007. He identified the problems that he believes the current foreign policy has caused, and the five ways the United States can lead again, focused on "common security", "common humanity", and remaining "a beacon of freedom and justice for the world":

- "Bringing a responsible end" to the war in Iraq and refocusing on the broader region.
- "Building the first truly 21st century military and showing wisdom in how we deploy it."
- "Marshalling a global effort" to secure, destroy, and stop the spread of weapons of mass destruction.
- "Rebuild and construct the alliances and partnerships necessary to meet common challenges and confront common threats," including global warming.
- "Invest in our common humanity" through foreign aid and supporting the "pillars of a sustainable democracy – a strong legislature, an independent judiciary, the rule of law, a vibrant civil society, a free press, and an honest police force."

During that speech, Obama called for an expansion of the U.S. Armed Forces "by adding 65,000 soldiers to the Army and 27,000 Marines", an idea previously introduced by Defense Secretary Robert Gates.

In a Washington, D.C., speech entitled "A New Strategy for a New World" delivered July 15, 2008, Obama stated five main foreign policy goals:

- Ending the war in Iraq responsibly.
- Finishing the fight against al Qaeda and the Taliban.
- Securing all nuclear weapons and materials from terrorists and rogue states.
- Achieving true energy security.
- Rebuilding US alliances to meet the challenges of the 21st century.

== Law enforcement and security policy ==
United States electronic surveillance reached what was then an all-time high under Obama, with increased monitoring of emails, text messages and phone conversations.

== Social policy ==
The Almanac of American Politics (2008) rated Obama's overall social policies in 2006 as more conservative than 21% of the U.S. Senate, and more liberal than 77% of the Senate (18% and 77%, respectively, in 2005).

In 2010, Obama signed the Don't Ask, Don't Tell Repeal Act of 2010, which ended a policy of not allowing gays, lesbians and bisexuals to state their sexual orientation openly in the military. In May 2012, he became the first sitting U.S. president to announce his support for legalizing same-sex marriage.

During his second inaugural address on January 21, 2013, Obama called for full equality for people who are LGBT: "Our journey is not complete until our gay brothers and sisters are treated like anyone else under the law — for if we are truly created equal, then surely the love we commit to one another must be equal as well." This was a historic moment, being the first time that a president mentioned gay rights or the word gay in an inaugural address.

== See also ==
- Comparison of the 2008 United States presidential candidates
- List of Barack Obama 2008 presidential campaign endorsements
- List of Barack Obama 2012 presidential campaign endorsements
- Political positions of Joe Biden
- Political positions of John McCain
- Political positions of Mitt Romney
