= No Apology =

2010 book by Mitt Romney

No Apology: The Case for American Greatness
- Author: Mitt Romney
- Language: English
- Subject: U.S. politics
- Publisher: St. Martin's Press
- Publication date: March 2, 2010
- Publication place: United States
- Media type: Print (hardcover and paperback)
- Pages: 336
- ISBN: 978-0-312-60980-1
- Preceded by: Turnaround: Crisis, Leadership, and the Olympic Games
- Followed by: N/A

No Apology: The Case for American Greatness is a book by former Massachusetts governor, two-time U.S. presidential candidate and U.S. Senator Mitt Romney, detailing his vision for the United States. It was published on March 2, 2010, by St. Martin's Press. The book debuted atop the New York Times Best Seller list for the week of March 12, 2010. A paperback version was released in 2011.

== Background and themes ==
Romney wrote the book over a six-month period from his office in Lexington, Massachusetts, and his beachside home in La Jolla, California, studying findings from think tanks and reading treatises on global economics. Romney originally found a ghostwriter to produce the book, but after being dissatisfied with the early results, decided to write it himself, with the help of a research assistant. The title makes reference to Romney's contention that President Barack Obama had apologized for past American actions during trips abroad, and the subtitle to Romney's belief in American exceptionalism.

The book avoids anecdotes about Romney's personal or political life and focuses much of its attention on a substantive presentation of his views on economic and geopolitical matters, including his inveighing against the resurgence of populism. Government is seen as having some valuable roles, such as fostering innovation and expanding health insurance coverage to everyone. The book largely avoids discussion of social issues.

Romney states generally that Americans "need to stimulate the economy, not the government." However, he defends the Bush administration's efforts through the Troubled Asset Relief Program (TARP) that he believes "prevented a systemic collapse of the national financial system". In terms of financial regulation and tax reform, he states that "personal taxes on dividends, interest, and capital gains for all middle-income families should be completely eliminated."

Romney writes about the need to expand American military programs and their funding. He recommends adding a minimum of 100,000 soldiers to the Marines and the Army specifically. He writes as well about updating America's nuclear stockpile, building a missile defense system, and researching into cyber-warfare.

== Promotional efforts ==
Romney launched a 19-state book tour to promote the volume, and also appeared on television programs such as the Today Show and The View. He spoke before thousands in the hall at the Salt Palace Convention Center in one of his home states, in an event that had the feel of a presidential campaign rally, much as the book itself was a blueprint for an eventual Romney run in the 2012 United States presidential election. Ben Smith of Politico.com reported that contractually enforced bulk purchases of the book were a part of the promotional tour plan: "his publisher, according to the document from the book tour − provided on the condition it not be described in detail − asked institutions to pay at least $25,000, and up to the full $50,000 price, in bulk purchases of the book."

== Commercial and critical reception ==
Romney said he did not expect the book would be a best seller, saying he had not written the kind of personal account that people like to read and saying he would fall far short of Sarah Palin's sales for her memoir, Going Rogue: An American Life. Nevertheless, St. Martin's Press did commit to an initial printing of 200,000 copies.

No Apology debuted at the top of the New York Times Best Seller list for the week of March 12, 2010. The Times stated that stores were reporting bulk orders for the book. The following week, the book slipped to the number four position.

Romney earned at least $100,000 from publishing the book; the money was donated to several charities, including the Joey Fund and the Cystic Fibrosis Foundation, Sabin Children's Foundation, the National Multiple Sclerosis Society, the Dana Farber Cancer Institute Jimmy Fund, Homes For Our Troops, and the Boston Boys & Girls Club.

Conservative print/online magazine Human Events ran a positive review by Jedediah Bila. Bila wrote that the "overall tone of the text is analytical. Like any practical businessman, Romney loves his data." She highlighted Romney's ideas on energy development, healthcare reform, education reform, and expanding U.S. 'soft power' as well as 'hard power'. She concluded, "All in all, Romney's book provides a well-organized display of his stand on key issues."

Three nonpartisan fact-checking outlets starkly disputed Romney's titular claim that Obama had ever staged an "apology tour".

== Paperback edition ==
The softcover edition of the book came out in February 2011, when Romney was nearing the June 2011 formal announcement of his 2012 presidential campaign. Now with a different subtitle, No Apology: Believe in America featured a new introduction that explicitly focused on themes of the Tea Party movement such as freedom and devotion to the U.S. Constitution. While much of the book's text remained unchanged from the hardcover edition, material on the 2009 stimulus package was rewritten to be more negative about the act's effects and material about what Romney saw as the differences between "Romneycare" and "Obamacare" was recast to add defenses of the former and be more aggressively opposed to the latter. According to PolitiFact.com, Romney engaged in "some strategic editing" by removing "a defense of state-level choice − not a pitch for a mandatory national approach."

Romney staged a two-day media tour to promote the new edition, appearing on shows such as The View, Good Morning America, Piers Morgan Tonight, and the Late Show with David Letterman.
