= Turnaround: Crisis, Leadership, and the Olympic Games =

2004 book by Mitt Romney

- Author: Mitt Romney
- Language: English
- Genre: Non-fiction
- Publisher: Regnery Publishing, Inc.
- Publication date: August 25, 2004
- Publication place: United States
- Media type: Print (hardcover and paperback)
- Pages: 416
- ISBN: 978-0-89526-084-0
- OCLC: 55952168
- Dewey Decimal: 796.98 22
- LC Class: GV842 2004 .R66 2004

Turnaround: Crisis, Leadership, and the Olympic Games is a 2004 book written by Governor of Massachusetts Mitt Romney with the acknowledged assistance of Timothy Robinson. The book tells the account of the scandal and turnaround of the 2002 Winter Olympics in Salt Lake City.

A paperback edition was released in 2007.
