= Political positions of John McCain =

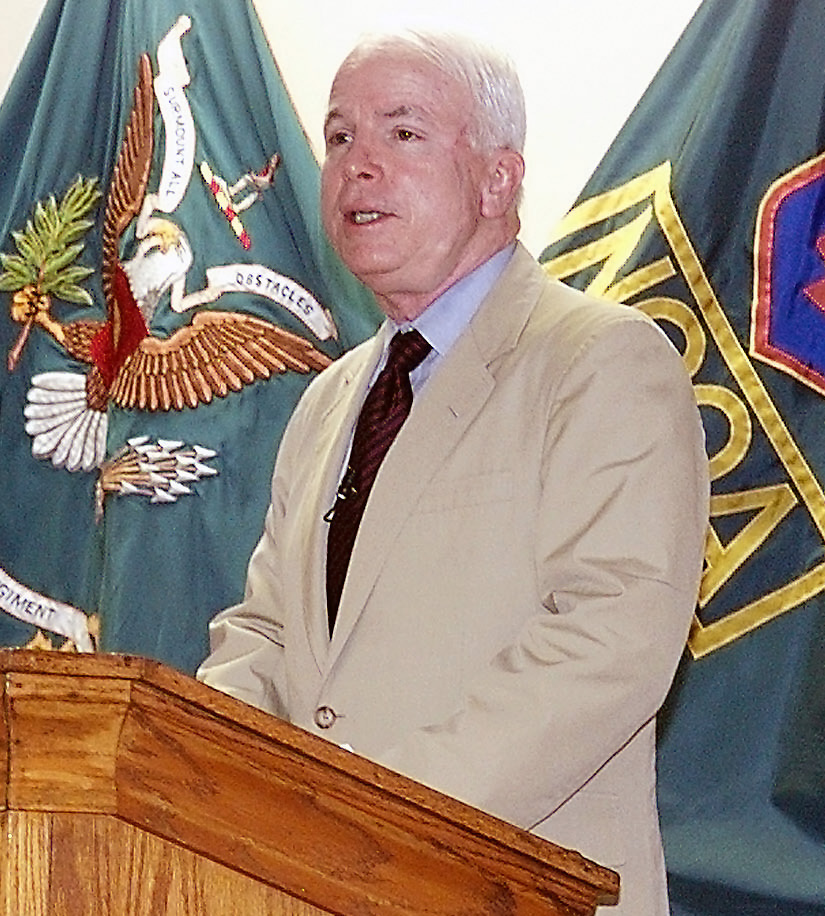
McCain in 2001

U.S. Senator John McCain, a Republican Party politician from Arizona who was a member of the U.S. Congress from 1983 until his death in office in 2018, a two-time U.S. presidential candidate, and the nominee of the Republican Party in the 2008 U.S. Presidential election, took positions on many political issues through his public comments, his presidential campaign statements, and his senatorial voting record.

Online, McCain used his Senate web site and his 2008 campaign web site to describe his political positions.

Regarding the general notion of consistency of political positions over time, McCain said in June 2008: "My principles and my practice and my voting record are very clear. Not only from 2000 but 1998 and 1992 and 1986. And you know, it's kind of a favorite tactical ploy now that opponents use, of saying the person has changed. Look, none of my principles or values have changed. Have I changed position on some specific issues because of changed circumstances? I would hope so! I would hope so!" McCain was considered a moderate or centrist at different times in his career such as when he opposed the planned implementation of the Bush tax cuts in 2004. It was often reported that McCain had grown more conservative throughout his tenure in the Senate, according to various studies. During Barack Obama's presidency, McCain was one of five Republicans most likely to vote in line with President Obama's position on legislation; he voted with Obama's position more than half the time in 2013.

The non-partisan National Journal published an analysis of members of Congress in which it gave McCain a composite ideological rating of 60% conservative and 40% liberal in 2013. On The Issues, a non-partisan and non-profit organization, identifies McCain as a "Libertarian Conservative". In 2017, the American Conservative Union gave McCain a 57% grade based on their positions and the ACU gives him an 81% lifetime conservative score; the American Civil Liberties Union, which focuses on civil rights and liberties, gave McCain a 53% rating in 2014. In 2013, Americans for Democratic Action, a progressive political action committee, gave him a rating of 20% in line with their positions.

He was a member of Republican Main Street Partnership, a Republican group which presents what it describes as centrist Republican solutions in politics.

== Economic policy ==
McCain's 2006 rating by The Almanac of American Politics (2008) on Economic Policy was 64% conservative, 35% liberal (52% conservative, 47% liberal in 2005). McCain fleshed out the main points of his economic plan in an April 15, 2008 speech at Carnegie Mellon University in Pennsylvania. In summary, McCain would make the Bush tax cuts permanent instead of letting them expire, he would eliminate the Alternative Minimum Tax in order to assist the middle-class, he would double the personal exemption for dependents, reduce the corporate tax rate, and offer a new research and development tax credit. At the same time, he pledged to eliminate pork-barrel spending, freeze nondefense discretionary spending for a year or more, and reduce Medicare growth. He was also opposed to extravagant salaries and severance deals of corporate CEOs. In 2013, the National Journal gave McCain an economic rating of 61% conservative and 38% liberal.

=== Budget, taxes, and deficits ===
Projected Federal tax changes in 2009 if their tax proposals fully approved by Congress. Yellow number is largest tax cut.
	McCain	Obama
Income	Average tax bill	Average tax bill
Over $2.9M	−$269,364	+$701,885
$603K and up	−$45,361	+$115,974
$227K–$603K	−$7,871	+$12
$161K–$227K	−$4,380	−$2,789
$112K–$161K	−$2,614	−$2,204
$66K–$112K	−$1,009	−$1,290
$38K–$66K	−$319	−$1,042
$19K–$38K	−$113	−$892
Under $19K	−$19	−$567
CNN, Tax Policy Center, BarackObama.com, JohnMcCain.com

Graph of Obama and McCain tax-cut plans. Obama in pink, McCain in blue; income brackets run across the bottom, tax cut amounts on the left. (Incomes above ≈$250,000 fall off this graph)

While McCain had historically opposed tax cuts in favor of deficit reduction, he supported tax cuts as part of his presidential campaign. He said that he would reduce government spending to make up for the tax cuts.

McCain had declined to sign the pledge of the group Americans for Tax Reform to not add any new taxes or increase existing taxes. However, after he lost the presidential election in 2008, McCain became a signer of Americans for Tax Reform's Taxpayer Protection Pledge. In 2002, Sen. McCain was one of only two Republicans to twice vote against the permanent repeal of the Estate Tax, and had stated opposition to a permanent repeal of the Estate Tax. McCain was one of two Republicans who voted against Bush's tax cuts in 2001. He opposed accelerating the cuts in 2003, saying that he was not in favor of cutting taxes during a time of war. In 2004 McCain appeared on Meet The Press with Tim Russert where he was asked about his opposition to the Bush tax cuts. McCain explained himself by saying, "I voted against the tax cuts because of the disproportional amount that went to the wealthiest Americans. I would clearly support not extending those tax cuts in order to help address the deficit." However, McCain supported the Bush tax cut extension in May 2006, and January 2008 he told Russert that he favored making those tax cuts permanent to prevent an increase in taxes while the economy was "shaky." He also said that his tax proposal would focus more on middle-income Americans than on the wealthy.

McCain had stated that he believed in keeping marginal tax rates low, but that lower taxes work best "when accompanied by lower spending."

In January 2008, McCain said "People talk about a stimulus package. Fine, if that's what we want to come up with. But stop the spending first."

In a major economic speech on April 15, 2008, McCain proposed a number of tax reductions and backed away from his pledge to balance the budget by the end of his first term, saying it would take him eight years. His speech focused on cuts to corporate tax rates and the extension of the Bush tax cuts, and also called for eliminating the alternative-minimum tax and doubling the value of exemptions for dependents to $7,000. This was in contrast to McCain's historical emphasis on deficit reduction in place of tax cuts. McCain's proposal for decreasing the federal budget deficit included reforming the "self-serving largesse that defines the current budget process." In the speech, McCain said that the savings from eliminating earmarks, reviewing federal programs and other budget reforms would be "on the order of $100 billion annually."

On July 8, 2008, in an interview, McCain said that "historically when you raise people's taxes, revenue goes down. Every time we cut capital gains taxes, there has been an increase in revenues."

=== Defense spending ===
McCain supported ending the Boeing C-17 Globemaster III, the Boeing YAL-1 Airborne Laser, and the Boeing and Science Applications International Corporation Future Combat Systems.

In 2016, McCain called the F-35 program a "scandal and a tragedy", noting a change in stance towards the topic from his 2012 position, as seen when an Arizonan airbase was chosen for the aircraft he lauded it as "the greatest combat aircraft in the history of the world".

=== Pork barrel spending (earmarks) ===
McCain was called one of the Senate's most outspoken critics of pork barrel spending. On April 16, 2007, McCain gave a speech on the U.S. economy to the Economic Club of Memphis. He criticized wasteful spending and reiterated his promise to make any sponsors of pork or earmarks "famous" when he becomes president.

In March 2008, Gannett News Service reported that McCain's home state of Arizona ranked last in federal earmarks, because three of the state's ten lawmakers in Washington – McCain and House Republicans Jeff Flake and John Shadegg – refuse to ask for any federal money for local projects. In March 2008, he was one of twenty-nine U.S. Senators, including Obama and Clinton, to vote in favor of a one-year moratorium on earmarks.

McCain said he hoped to stop special interests from lobbying for special projects. His 2008 campaign website included the statement that "The federal government spends too much money, squanders precious resources on questionable projects pushed by special interests, and ignores the priorities of the American taxpayer." Earmarks total about $18 billion a year, according to independent estimates. However, on August 2, 2007, he voted against a bi-partisan bill to provide greater transparency in the legislative process and to regulate lobbyists.

=== Free trade ===
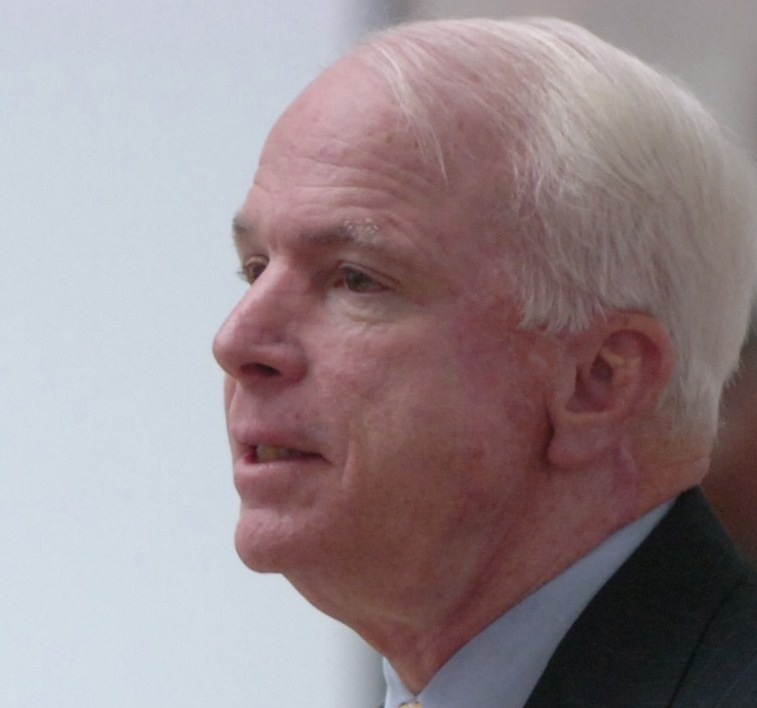
U.S. Senator John McCain

McCain was a strong proponent of free trade. He supported the North American Free Trade Agreement (NAFTA), the existing General Agreement on Tariffs and Trade (GATT) agreements, U.S. participation in the World Trade Organization, and opposed renegotiation of trade agreements, saying, ".the U.S. should engage in multilateral, regional and bilateral efforts to reduce barriers to trade, level the global playing field and build effective enforcement of global trading rules." In 2004, when McCain was asked, "Should trade agreements include provisions to address environmental concerns and to protect workers' rights?", he answered, "No."

Regarding protectionism, in 2007 McCain said, "I'm a student of history. Every time the United States has become protectionist . we've paid a very heavy price. The Smoot-Hawley Tariff Acts in the 1930s were direct contributors to World War II. It sounds like a lot of fun to bash China and others, but free trade has been the engine of our economy. Free trade should be the continuing principle that guides this nation's economy."

=== Social Security and Medicare ===
In June 1999, McCain said "The only way to increase the yield on Social Security dollars is by allowing workers to make investment decisions for themselves; by empowering American families to invest, in most robust portfolios, a portion of their earnings for Social Security that they would otherwise pay in taxes to Social Security." In January 2000, he repeated his strong support for creating partially private Social Security accounts. In 2004, he said, "Without privatization, I don't see how you can possibly, over time, make sure that young Americans are able to receive Social Security benefits."

In April 2008, McCain proposed that seniors with higher incomes should pay higher premiums for government-provided prescription drug benefits (Medicare Part D) as a way to reduce federal spending on health care.

As of May 2008, McCain's web site says:

John McCain will fight to save the future of Social Security and believes that we may meet our obligations to the retirees of today and the future without raising taxes. John McCain supports supplementing the current Social Security system with personal accounts – but not as a substitute for addressing benefit promises that cannot be kept.

On June 12, 2008, McCain fielded a question in a town hall meeting, saying, "But I'm not for quote privatizing Social Security, I never have been, I never will be."

On July 7, 2008, McCain criticized the traditional pay-as-you-go financing of Social Security, saying: "Americans have got to understand that we are paying present-day retirees with the taxes paid by young workers in America today. And that's a disgrace." The next day, he reiterated that Social Security uses current workers' tax payments to fund current retirees' benefits, and he said, "That's why it's broken, that's why we can fix it."

McCain offered no specific plan to address the possible Social Security shortfall, preferred not to raise taxes, and all options, including payroll tax increases, are "on the table".

=== Subprime mortgage crisis ===
Regarding the subprime mortgage crisis, McCain said its root cause was loose credit and greed. On January 31, 2008, he said, "I think there are some greedy people on Wall Street that perhaps need to be punished." He also praised the George W. Bush administration's handling of the crisis. McCain later addressed the situation in a speech:

I will not play election year politics with the housing crisis. I will evaluate everything in terms of whether it might be harmful or helpful to our effort to deal with the crisis we face now. I have always been committed to the principle that it is not the duty of government to bail out and reward those who act irresponsibly, whether they are big banks or small borrowers. Government assistance to the banking system should be based solely on preventing systemic risk that would endanger the entire financial system and the economy.

McCain went on to say he would entertain the thought to only give temporary assistance to homeowners for their primary homes, but not to others who owned homes to rent out nor to speculators. He also proposed that mortgage lenders do more to help the economy by helping their customers. He suggested an approach that General Motors did after the September 11 attacks when they reduced interest rates for their customers. "We need a similar response by the mortgage lenders. They've been asking the government to help them out. I'm now calling upon them to help their customers, and their nation out. It's time to help American families."

McCain's speech on the Senate floor during debate of Federal Housing Regulatory Act Of 2005:

OFHEO's report solidifies my view that the GSEs need to be reformed without delay. I join as a cosponsor of the Federal Housing Enterprise Regulatory Reform Act of 2005, S. 190, to underscore my support for quick passage of GSE regulatory reform legislation. If Congress does not act, American taxpayers will continue to be exposed to the enormous risk that Fannie Mae and Freddie Mac pose to the housing market, the overall financial system, and the economy as a whole.

Introduced January 2005, S.190 was a bill to address the regulation of secondary mortgage market enterprises, and for other purposes. McCain was a co-sponsor.

As of mid-September 2008, McCain had not introduced any banking or housing bills in the 110th Congress, which began in January 2007.

In October 2008, McCain proposed that the federal government buy troubled mortgages, and provide low-interest mortgages to qualified homeowners. For people with 401(k) plans, he wanted to allow more flexibility about when money can be withdrawn, and would lower the tax on that money, as well as lowering the tax on unemployment insurance benefits. McCain also proposed to cut the capital gains tax on stock held for more than one year, while increasing the tax write-off for stock losses.

=== Financial deregulation ===
In 1999, McCain voted for the Gramm–Leach–Bliley Act, which passed in the Senate by a vote of 54–44. The deregulation bill loosened restrictions on the activities of banks, brokerage houses, and insurance companies. In 2002 he voted for the Sarbanes–Oxley Act, which passed the Senate without opposition. In 2007, however, McCain stated that he regretted his vote in favor of Sarbanes-Oxley, which strengthened financial reporting requirements for publicly held companies but which has been the subject of complaints from businesses.

In 2008, McCain expressed approval of the results of financial deregulation by pointing to it as a model for health care policy, writing: "Opening up the health insurance market to more vigorous nationwide competition, as we have done over the last decade in banking, would provide more choices of innovative products less burdened by the worst excesses of state-based regulation."

Later in 2008, in the wake of the widely publicized crises involving the insurance company American International Group and the brokerage houses Lehman Brothers and Merrill Lynch, McCain stated: "In my administration, we're going to hold people on Wall Street responsible. And we're going to enact and enforce reforms to make sure that these outrages never happen in the first place."

In 2009, McCain temporarily expressed support for reinstating the Glass–Steagall Act that he had voted to repeal in order to respond to banking regulation failures in the 2008 financial crisis, though he also ultimately voted against the Obama Administration-backed Dodd–Frank Wall Street Reform and Consumer Protection Act.

=== Health care ===
[In an ownership society], the key to health care reform is to restore control to the patients themselves.

McCain was against publicly funded health care, universal health care, or health coverage mandates. Instead, he favored tax credits of up to $5,000 for families to get health insurance. His plan focused on enhancing competition in the health care industry as a way to lower costs. To that end, McCain favored the Health Care Choice Act, which would allow citizens to purchase health insurance nationwide instead of limiting them to in-state companies, and to buy insurance through any organization or association they choose as well as through their employers or buying direct from an insurance company. In an October 2007 statement, McCain said: "In health care, we believe in enhancing the freedom of individuals to receive necessary and desired care. We do not believe in coercion and the use of state power to mandate care, coverage or costs." In 2001, McCain co-sponsored a patients' bill of rights with Democratic Senators John Edwards and Ted Kennedy, and the bill garnered the support of eight other Republican Senators.

On April 29, 2008, McCain detailed his health care plan in the context of his campaign for president. His plan focused on open-market competition rather than government funding or control. At the heart of his plan are tax credits – $2,500 for individuals and $5,000 for families who do not subscribe to or do not have access to health care through their employer. He says the money could be used to purchase insurance and force insurance companies to be competitive with their costs in order to attract consumers. To help people who are denied coverage by insurance companies due to pre-existing conditions, McCain would work with states to create what he calls a "Guaranteed Access Plan". He did not provide details, but pointed to states such as Florida and North Carolina where such systems are in place. His health care plan has an estimated annual cost of $7 billion, according to McCain's health-policy experts. On April 30, his campaign acknowledged that the health plan he had outlined would have the effect of increasing tax payments for some workers, primarily those with high incomes and expensive health plans.

McCain would have paid for individual tax credits primarily by eliminating the tax break currently offered to employers for providing health insurance to employees. On October 5, 2008, Douglas Holtz-Eakin, McCain's senior policy adviser, said the tax credits would also be funded in part from eliminating Medicare fraud and by changing Medicare and Medicaid payment policies to lower the overall cost of medical care.

In 2017, McCain voted in favor of proceeding with a motion to debate healthcare legislation. Subsequently, McCain voted against a bill to repeal the Affordable Care Act without a replacement. On July 28, 2017, McCain voted against the Senate bill to repeal the ACA.

=== Technology ===
McCain voted against the Telecommunications Act of 1996 (that includes Section 230 of the Communications Decency Act) on the grounds that it would not ensure competition enough in practice, making him and Oregon Senator Bob Packwood the only Republicans to vote against the measure.

On August 14, 2008, McCain released a policy paper titled "John McCain and American Innovation" that proposed a 10% tax credit for wages paid employees doing research and development. The plan reiterated McCain's positions against Internet taxes and against laws guaranteeing net neutrality.

Crypto notes that Senator McCain and Senator [Bob Kerrey] introduced a bill in mid-1997 that would have refused the services of future government-sponsored certificate authorities to those who refused key escrow. However, it notes that by 1999, McCain had flipped on the issue of encryption, becoming "Mr. Crypto."

In 2002, McCain introduced the Consumer Broadband Deregulation Act of 2002, a deregulation measure aimed at preventing the government from requiring broadband providers to offer access to competing ISPs in the residential broadband market.

In 2006, McCain advocated easing of regulations to allow cable television companies to offer programming on an à la carte, per channel basis, along the lines of the Family and Consumer Choice Act of 2007.

McCain was against government regulation of network neutrality unless evidence of abuse exists. He was quoted as saying, "let's see how this thing all turns out, rather than anticipate a problem that so far has not arisen in any significant way." Until such a time, he supported allowing network owners to control what sites consumers view, saying, in May 2007, "When you control the pipe you should be able to get profit from your investment".

In October 2009, McCain introduced the Internet Freedom Act, which prevented the Federal Communications Commission (FCC) from regulating broadband providers and enforcing net neutrality rules, and characterized such regulation as "onerous" amounting to a government takeover. McCain received over $890,000 in campaign contributions during his career from companies opposed to net neutrality.

On May 9, 2013, McCain introduced the Television Consumer Freedom Act, which required cable and satellite providers to offer an a la carte service or lose their compulsory license to rebroadcast television stations, required broadcasters to offer carriage of their channels on a similar a la carte basis, banned blackouts of sporting events at any venue that was constructed using taxpayer money, and allowed the FCC to pull and auction off the broadcast licenses of any broadcaster who shifts their over-the-air programming to cable-only (in response to similar threats in response to the controversy surrounding the service Aereo).

=== Transportation ===
McCain was opposed to federal funding of Amtrak. He considered it to be a "pork barrel project", particularly as far as longer distance trains are concerned. He had also argued for more stringent safety standards with respect to cars.

=== Native American affairs ===
As a member of the House, McCain sponsored a number of Indian Affairs bills, dealing mainly with giving distribution of lands to reservations and tribal tax status; most of these bills were unsuccessful. He then got the Indian Economic Development Act of 1985 signed into law.

As a senator, McCain often supported the Native American agenda, advocating self-governance and sovereignty and tribe control of adoptions. Along with Senator Daniel Inouye and Representative Mo Udall, McCain was one of the main writers of the 1988 Indian Gaming Regulatory Act, which codified rules regarding Native American gambling enterprises and established the balance between Indian tribal sovereignty and regulatory oversight by the states of such activity. The Act enabled the growth of what would become, two decades later, the $23 billion Indian gaming industry.

In late 2004, McCain helped pass the Arizona Water Settlements Act, the most extensive Indian water settlement in the country's history. In response to the Jack Abramoff Indian lobbying scandal and other developments regarding Indian gaming, by 2005 and 2006 McCain was pushing for amendments to the Indian Gaming Regulatory Act that would limit creation of off-reservation casinos by Indian tribes as well as tribes moving across state borders. During 2007, he continued to introduce a number of Indian affairs-related legislation.

=== Veterans benefits ===
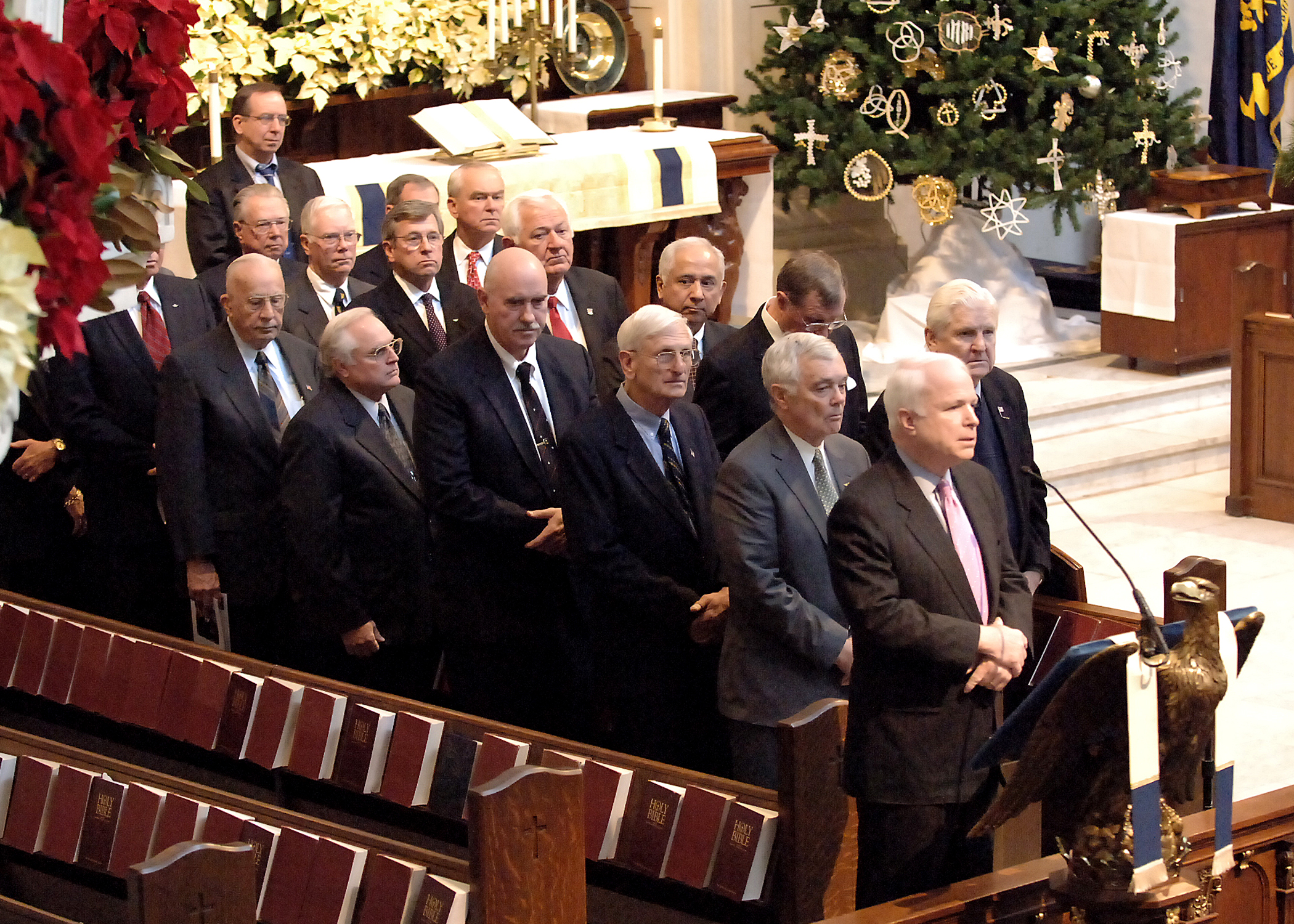
McCain and other former Vietnam prisoners of war, 2005

McCain initially opposed the Post-9/11 Veterans Educational Assistance Act, introduced by Senator Jim Webb, which provides college-tuition benefits for veterans in a manner similar to that of the original G.I. Bill for veterans of World War II. McCain supported the contention of some in the Defense Department that the original bill's provision of offering four years of full college tuition after only three years of active duty service would entice service members to leave the military sooner than they otherwise might. McCain and Senator Lindsey Graham instead introduced a competing bill, that sought to improve current Montgomery G.I. Bill benefits, but provided a lower total amount of benefits than what Webb proposed. McCain's proposal emphasized benefits for service members who were still active. McCain said:

I want to make sure that we have incentives for people to remain in the military, as well as for people to join the military. I've talked a lot about veterans' health care, so we'll continue to talk about those issues and how to care for vets. I know I can do that, having been one.

McCain's alternative would have had a sliding scale of benefits to encourage retention by only offering the top level of benefits to those who stay for six years. McCain also argued that his version would involve less new bureaucracy than Webb's bill. A late May vote on the Webb bill passed 75–22, with McCain missing the vote due to being away from Washington.

In early June 2008, the White House signaled the president might be willing to sign a modified version of the Webb bill, along with the war funding bill, if transferability between spouses and dependents was added onto the new GI Bill. This would make the benefits more valuable to career military personnel that would like to pay for their spouse or child's education. On June 19, this provision was added to the war funding bill. With the added transferability provisions for continued military service, McCain said he now supported the bill, because it encouraged additional service beyond three years, mitigating his earlier concerns. McCain, who had not voted in the Senate since April 8, was campaigning in Ohio on June 26 and was not present for the final senate vote on the bill, which passed 92–6 (The only other senator not voting was Ted Kennedy, who was recovering after surgery to remove a brain tumor). Bush signed the war funding bill, along with the veterans education benefits, into law on June 30, 2008.

In 2014, McCain called for a private option for veteran's medical care.

=== Federal minimum wage ===
McCain opposed the federal minimum wage; instead he believed that each state should decide its own minimum wage. On January 24, 2007, he voted Yes on legislation that would allow employers to pay less than the federal minimum wage if the state set a lower minimum. He also voted in favor of maintaining the filibuster against a bill to increase the federal minimum wage from $5.15 an hour to $7.25. This would effectively repeal the federal minimum wage. McCain voted 19 times against raising the minimum wage.

=== Equal pay ===
McCain said that he favored the concept of equal pay (the abolition of wage differences based on gender). He has, however, opposed specific legislation that would have given workers more time to discover sex discrimination before bringing suit under the Equal Pay Act of 1963. In 2007, the House of Representatives passed the Lilly Ledbetter Fair Pay Act, which, according to the National Federation of Independent Business, would have allowed "employees to file charges of pay discrimination within 180 days of the last received paycheck affected by the alleged discriminatory decision." The bill would have overturned the Supreme Court decision in Ledbetter v. Goodyear. There the Court dismissed a woman's discrimination claim because she had filed it more than 180 days after the first affected paycheck. McCain, who said he opposed the bill, was campaigning in New Orleans, Louisiana, at the time of the Senate vote in 2008, when the bill died because Democrats could not break a Republican filibuster (The vote in favor of the bill was 56–42, with 60 needed for cloture).

== Foreign policy ==
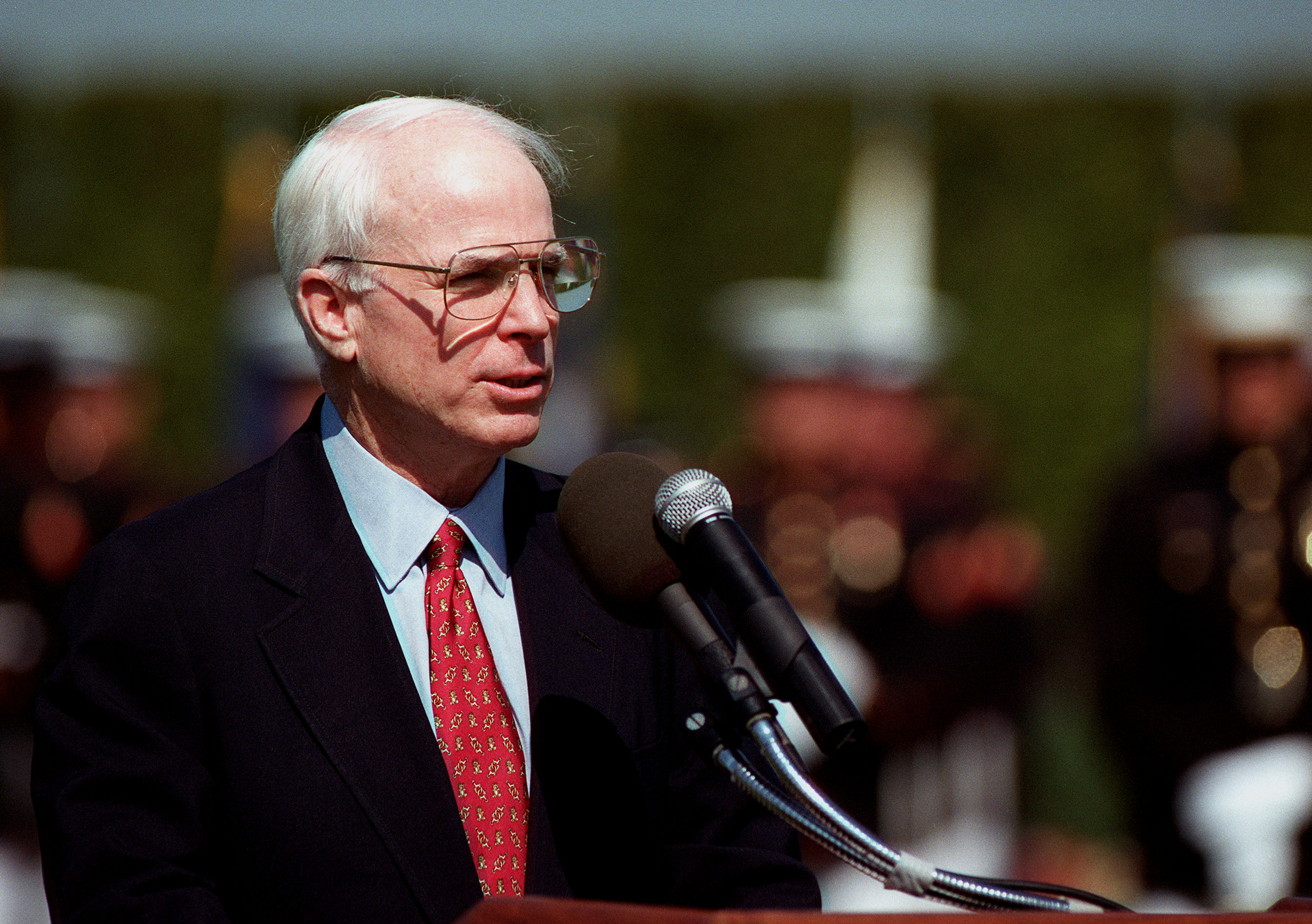
McCain delivers keynote address at the Pentagon on National POW/MIA Recognition Day, Sept. 19, 1997

McCain advocated for the withdrawal of US troops from Lebanon in 1982 (prior to the attack on the Marine barracks), Somalia in 1993, and Haiti in 1994. He was one of only 27 Republicans to vote against President Ronald Reagan's decision to put "peacekeeping" troops into Lebanon, saying in a speech on the floor of the House of Representatives that:

The fundamental question is: What is the United States' interest in Lebanon? It is said we are there to keep the peace. I ask, what peace? It is said we are there to aid the government. I ask, what government? It is said we are there to stabilize the region. I ask, how can the U.S. presence stabilize the region? . The longer we stay in Lebanon, the harder it will be for us to leave. We will be trapped by the case we make for having our troops there in the first place. What can we expect if we withdraw from Lebanon? The same as will happen if we stay. I acknowledge that the level of fighting will increase if we leave. I regretfully acknowledge that many innocent civilians will be hurt. But I firmly believe this will happen in any event.

In February 2000, during a Republican debate, McCain and other candidates were asked what foreign policy they would change immediately if they became President. "I'd institute a policy that I call 'rogue state rollback,'" McCain said. "I would arm, train, equip, both from without and from within, forces that would eventually overthrow the governments and install free and democratically- elected governments."

McCain's 2006 foreign policy rating, compiled by the Almanac of American Politics (2008), was 58% conservative, 40% liberal. 2005 figures were similar: 54% conservative, 45% liberal.

In March 2008, McCain said that the United States should "strengthen our global alliances as the core of a new global compact – a League of Democracies – that can harness the vast influence of the more than one hundred democratic nations around the world to advance our values and defend our shared interests." He said that the United States did not single-handedly win the Cold War, but rather the NATO alliance did so, "in concert with partners around the world." In 2013, the National Journal gave McCain a rating of 60% conservative and 39% liberal.

Among McCain's advisers were Robert Kagan and William Kristol, the co-founders of PNAC and neo-conservatives who were influential in implementing the Iraq War. McCain allied himself with President George W. Bush, who brought into his administration a large number of PNAC members and neo-conservatives.

=== Israel ===
McCain was a staunch supporter of Israel. In a speech to the American Israel Public Affairs Committee on April 23, 2002, McCain said that "no American leader should be expected to sell a false peace to our ally, consider Israel's right to self-defense less legitimate than ours, or insist that Israel negotiate a political settlement while terrorism remains the Palestinians' preferred bargaining tool." During the 2006 Lebanon War, McCain said, regarding Israel's role in the conflict with Lebanon and Hezbollah, "What would we do if somebody came across our borders and killed our soldiers and captured our soldiers? Do you think we would be exercising total restraint?"

During the 2008 presidential election, when asked if the Zionist cause was just and has succeeded, McCain responded, "I think so. I'm a student of history and anybody who is familiar with the history of the Jewish people and with the Zionist idea can't help but admire those who established the Jewish homeland. I think it's remarkable that Zionism has been in the middle of wars and great trials and it has held fast to the ideals of democracy and social justice and human rights. I think that the State of Israel remains under significant threat from terrorist organizations as well as the continued advocacy of the Iranians to wipe Israel off the map."

McCain called for the early release of convicted Israeli spy Jonathan Pollard, who served a 30-year prison sentence for passing U.S. secrets to Israel.

During the 2008 presidential campaign, McCain's advisors stated that they were not in favor of the peace negotiations then ongoing between Israel and Syria.

McCain had courted the support of individuals and groups opposed to the creation of a Palestinian state. In 2008, McCain's advisors stated that they did not favor continuing the peace process between Israel and the Palestinians.

=== Detention and torture of extrajudicial prisoners ===
In October 2005, McCain, a former POW, introduced an amendment to the Defense Appropriations bill for 2005. That month, the U.S. Senate voted 90–9 to support the amendment. The amendment was commonly referred to as the Amendment on (1) the Army Field Manual and (2) Cruel, Inhumane, Degrading Treatment, amendment #1977 and also known as the McCain Amendment 1977. It became the Detainee Treatment Act of 2005 as Title X of the Department of Defense Authorization bill. The amendment prohibits inhumane treatment of prisoners, including prisoners at Guantanamo Bay, by confining interrogations to the techniques in Army Field Manual 34–52, "Intelligence Interrogation".

On December 15, 2005, Bush announced that he accepted McCain's terms and will "make it clear to the world that this government does not torture and that we adhere to the international convention of torture, whether it be here at home or abroad." Bush made clear his interpretation of this legislation on December 30, 2005, in a signing statement, reserving what he interpreted to be his presidential constitutional authority in order to avoid further terrorist attacks.

McCain argued that American military and intelligence personnel in future wars will suffer for abuses committed in 2006 by the US in the name of fighting terrorism. He feared the administration's policy will put American prisoners at risk of torture, summary executions and other atrocities by chipping away at Geneva Conventions. He argued that his rival bill to Bush's plan gives defendants access to classified evidence being used to convict them and would set tight limits on use of testimony obtained by coercion. Furthermore, it offered CIA interrogators some legal protections from charges of abuse, but rejected the administration's plan to more narrowly define the Geneva Conventions' standards for humane treatment of prisoners. McCain insisted that this issue overrided politics.

McCain, whose 5 and a half years of captivity and torture in Vietnam made him a national celebrity, negotiated (in September 2006) a compromise in the Senate for the Military Commissions Act of 2006, suspending habeas corpus provisions for anyone deemed by the Executive Branch an "unlawful enemy combatant" and barring them from challenging their detentions in court. Coming on the heels of a Supreme Court decision adverse to the White House, McCain's compromise gave a retroactive, nine-year immunity to U.S. officials who authorized, ordered, or committed acts of torture and abuse, and permitted the use of statements obtained through torture to be used in military tribunals so long as the abuse took place by December 30, 2005. McCain's compromise permitted the president to establish permissible interrogation techniques and to "interpret the meaning and application" of international Geneva Convention standards, so long as the coercion fell short of "serious" bodily or psychological injury. Widely dubbed McCain's "torture compromise", the bill was signed into law by George W. Bush on October 17, 2006, shortly before the 2006 midterm elections.

McCain said in March 2007 that he would "immediately close Guantanamo Bay, move all the prisoners to Fort Leavenworth and truly expedite the judicial proceedings in their cases". On September 19, 2007, he voted against restoring habeas corpus to detainees.

In October 2007, McCain said of waterboarding that, "They [other presidential candidates] should know what it is. It is not a complicated procedure. It is torture." In February 2008 he voted against HR 2082, the Intelligence Authorization Act for Fiscal Year 2008, which included provisions that would have prevented the CIA from waterboarding prisoners. The bill in question contained other provisions to which McCain objected, and his spokesman stated: "This wasn't a vote on waterboarding. This was a vote on applying the standards of the [Army] field manual to CIA personnel."

He said that

It is difficult to overstate the damage that any practice of torture or cruel, inhuman, and degrading treatment by Americans does to our national character and historical reputation—to our standing as an exceptional nation among the countries of the world. It is too grave to justify the use of these interrogation techniques. America has made its progress in the world not only by avidly pursuing our geopolitical interests, but by persuading and inspiring other nations to embrace the political values that distinguish us. As I have already said many times and still maintain, this is not about the terrorists. It is about us.

=== Iran ===
McCain called the crisis with Iran "the most serious crisis we have faced – outside of the entire war on terror – since the end of the Cold War." "Nuclear capability in Iran is unacceptable," said McCain. McCain criticized Russia and China for causing "gridlock" in the UN Security Council and preventing the sanctioning of Iran as well as other areas of conflict such as Darfur and Burma. If elected, McCain pledged to create a "league of democracies" with the purpose of addressing those conflicts without the approval of China and Russia.

McCain cited Iran's stance towards Israel as justification for his aggressive policy towards Iran, saying, "Iran is dedicated to the destruction of Israel. That alone should concern us but now they are trying for nuclear capabilities. I totally support the president when he says we will not allow Iran to destroy Israel."

Regarding military action against Iran, McCain said, "I pray every night that we will avoid a conflict with Iran." He has also said, "There's a whole lot of things we can do before we seriously consider the military option," but clarifying, "I still say there's only one thing worse than military action against Iran and that is a nuclear-armed Iran." His comments regarding "bombing Iran" made to veterans in South Carolina have come under scrutiny, despite McCain's statement that the comments were made in jest.

McCain tried to persuade FIFA to ban Iran from the 2006 World Cup, referring to Iranian President Mahmoud Ahmadinejad's Holocaust denials as the reason since such denials in Germany, where the competition was held, are illegal.

In June 2008, a group of congressional Democrats criticized McCain for voting against 2005 legislation that would have toughened sanctions against Iran. "McCain tries to give the impression that he's tough on Iran, but when it came time to stand up to party leaders and Big Oil, John McCain stood down," said senator Frank Lautenberg.

Following the 2009 Iranian election protests, McCain said "It really is a sham that [Iranian rulers have] pulled off, and I hope that we will act." He Tweeted on the subject as well, saying to a reporter, "@jaketapper USA always stands for freedom and democracy!!". An advocate of the People's Mujahedin of Iran (MEK), McCain appeared at their gatherings.

=== Iraq War ===
In February 2000, McCain said "As long as Saddam Hussein is in power, I am convinced that he will pose a threat to our security."

McCain supported the 2003 invasion of Iraq and the U.S. decision to overthrow Saddam Hussein.

In April 2004, McCain was asked by Peter G. Peterson what the United States should do if the "Iraqi government asks us to leave, even if we are unhappy about the security situation there?" McCain responded, "I think it's obvious that we would have to leave because – if it was an elected government of Iraq. . "

Following the invasion he criticized the Bush Administration's conduct of the occupation, and he later pushed for "significant policy changes" in the Iraq War. He criticized The Pentagon on a number of occasions, most notably in December 2004, concerning low troop strength in Iraq, and has called for a diversification of Iraqi national forces to better represent the multiple ethnic groups contained within the country.

In January 2005, McCain said that "one of our big problems has been the fact that many Iraqis resent American military presence. . as soon as we can reduce our visibility as much as possible, the better I think it is going to be."

In November 2005 McCain said in a speech that the U.S. government must do more to keep public support high for the war, and that more troops were needed, as well as a number of other changes in the U.S. approach to the war. He concluded his speech by saying that "America, Iraq and the world are better off with Saddam Hussein in prison rather than in power . and we must honor their sacrifice by seeing this mission through to victory."

In October 2006, McCain said that he had "no confidence" in then-Secretary of Defense Donald Rumsfeld, but was not calling for his resignation at that time, saying that "the president picks his team, and the president has the right to stay with that team if he wants to."

On January 10, 2007, Bush announced the commitment of more than 20,000 additional troops as a part of the Iraqi troop surge of 2007. McCain was a leading advocate for the move, leading some Democrats to call the policy the "McCain Doctrine". Days after the announcement, McCain appeared on CBS' Face the Nation and said, "This is a chance under the new leadership of General Petraeus and Admiral Fallon to have a chance to succeed. Do I believe it can succeed? Yes, I do." On February 4, he criticised a bipartisan non-binding resolution opposing the troop buildup, calling it a "vote of no confidence" in the US military.

McCain's April 11, 2007, speech on Iraq was delivered to the Virginia Military Institute Corps of Cadets after his return from Iraq. He supported a new strategy in Iraq and opposed Democratic efforts towards troop withdrawal. McCain repeated his criticism of the Bush administration's handling of the Iraq War on April 29 in Elko, Nevada, and stated that Rumsfeld would be remembered as "one [of] the worst secretaries of defense in history".

On September 19, 2007, McCain voted against requiring minimum periods between deployments.

In November 2007, on the Charlie Rose show on PBS, Rose asked if South Korea might be an analogy of where Iraq might be, in terms of an American presence, over the next 20 to 25 years. McCain replied that he didn't think so – even if there were no (ongoing) casualties, saying "I can see an American presence for a while. But eventually I think because of the nature of the society in Iraq and the religious aspects of it that America eventually withdraws.

On January 3, 2008, at a campaign stop in Derry, New Hampshire, when a questioner said, "President Bush has talked about our staying in Iraq for 50 years," McCain responded:

Make it a hundred. We've been in Japan for 60 years, we've been in South Korea for 50 years or so. That'd be fine with me as long as Americans are not being injured or harmed or wounded or killed. That's fine with me. I hope it will be fine with you if we maintain a presence in a very volatile part of the world where Al Qaeda is training, recruiting, equipping, and motivating people every single day.

In March 2008, McCain said of Iraq and terrorism that "Gen. Petraeus is correct when he says that the central battleground in the struggle against al Qaeda is Iraq and Osama bin Laden just confirmed that again with his comments last week." In April 2008 he said, "There are tough decisions ahead and America deserves leaders that are up to the challenge. As president, I will ensure that our troops come home victorious in this war that is part of the larger struggle against radical Islamic extremism and will continue to make keeping our nation secure my highest priority."

In a May 15, 2008, speech in Columbus, Ohio, McCain said:

By January 2013, America has welcomed home most of the servicemen and women who have sacrificed terribly so that America might be secure in her freedom. The Iraq War has been won. . Iraq is a functioning democracy, although still suffering from the lingering effects of decades of tyranny and centuries of sectarian tension. Violence still occurs, but it is spasmodic and much reduced. . The United States maintains a military presence there, but a much smaller one, and it does not play a direct combat role.

In a June 11, 2008, interview on NBC's Today Show, McCain was asked whether, in light of recent progress from the troop surge in Iraq, he had a clearer idea of when U.S. troops could begin withdrawing. He replied:

No, but that's not too important. What's important is casualties in Iraq. Americans are in South Korea. Americans are in Japan. American troops are in Germany. That's all fine. American casualties, and the ability to withdraw. We will be able to withdraw. . But the key to it is we don't want any more Americans in harm's way.

In his 2018 book The Restless Wave: Good Times, Just Causes, Great Fights, and Other Appreciations, McCain was critical of the Iraq War:

The principal reason for invading Iraq, that Saddam had WMD, was wrong. The war, with its cost in lives and treasure and security, can't be judged as anything other than a mistake, a very serious one, and I have to accept my share of the blame for it.

=== Afghanistan ===
McCain was an advocate for strong military measures against those responsible for the September 11 attacks in 2001 and supported the U.S.-led war in Afghanistan. In a late October 2001 Wall Street Journal op-ed piece he wrote, "America is under attack by a depraved, malevolent force that opposes our every interest and hates every value we hold dear." He advocated an overwhelming, not incremental, approach against the Taliban in Afghanistan, including the use of ground forces, saying, "War is a miserable business. Let's get on with it."

In October 2005, McCain said "Afghanistan, we don't read about anymore, because it's succeeded. And by the way, there's several reasons, including NATO participation and other reasons, why Afghanistan is doing as well as it is."

In December 2006, asked if the U.S. would send more troops to Afghanistan, McCain said, "The British have said that they will be sending additional troops, taking troops out of Iraq and into Afghanistan. If it's necessary, we will, and I'm sure we would be agreeable, but the focus here is more on training the Afghan National Army and the police, as opposed to the increased U.S. troop presence."

In July 2008, McCain said that reducing U.S. forces in Iraq would free up troops for Afghanistan, where "at least" three additional brigades, or about 15,000 troops, must be sent. A campaign aide said later that McCain's proposal included a combination of both U.S. and NATO forces.

=== Libya ===
On August 14, 2009, McCain, along with Senators Joe Lieberman and Lindsey Graham, met with Libyan leader Muammar Gaddafi in Tripoli "to talk . about a transfer of American military equipment." At the meeting, Gaddafi's son Muatassim "emphasized Libya's interest in the purchase of U.S. lethal and non-lethal military equipment," and McCain "assured Muatassim that the United States wanted to provide Libya with the equipment it needs." Following the meeting, McCain sent out a tweet declaring that he had spent "an interesting evening with an interesting man." During the 2011 Libyan civil war, McCain called for the removal of Gaddafi from power, due to Gaddafi having "'American blood on his hands' from the 1988 Lockerbie bombing." In April 2011, he became the 'highest-profile Western politician' to visit the rebels in Libya, urging Washington to consider a ground attack that aims for the absolute removal of Gaddafi. He later said the airpower policy that Obama had pursued should be the model for American actions against other countries in the region.

=== Kosovo ===
"It is time to bring Kosovo – and the Balkans with it – out of the 1990s and into the 21st century by recognizing Kosovo's independence. Eleven years ago, that region was in flames, characterized by ethnic cleansing and widespread violence. For the first time the region is today poised to move forward, with final status for Kosovo and transitioning continuing responsibilities there to increasing European control – at long last closing the door on the region's painful past," stated McCain at the Munich Security Conference in February 2008. During the crisis in the Serbian breakaway province of Kosovo in 1999, McCain urged President Clinton to use all necessary force.

=== North Korea ===
In October 2006, McCain said that he believed the former President Bill Clinton and his administration were to blame for the North Korea's weapons of mass destruction. He said that the U.S. had "concluded an unenforceable and untransparent agreement", allowing North Korea to keep plutonium rods in a reactor. In an article he wrote for the November/December 2007 issue of Foreign Affairs, he referred to North Korea as a "totalitarian regime," and said that it was necessary for North Korea be committed to "verifiable denuclearization" and "full accounting of all its nuclear materials and facilities" before any "lasting diplomatic agreement can be reached."

In a 2003 interview with PBS's Frontline he called the Clinton policy towards North Korea "appeasement" and said the U.S. should've attacked North Korea in the Clinton years to prevent a nuclear capability.

" MARTIN SMITH: You called Clinton an appeaser.

Sen. JOHN McCAIN: Well, you know, if it quacks like a duck and walks like a duck, it's appeasement.

MARTIN SMITH: So what was the alternative?

Sen. JOHN McCAIN: The alternative was to say, "You stop this development of nuclear weapons, or we exercise every option we have," not excluding the military option, sanctions, conversations with the Japanese, the Chinese, the South Koreans, the Russians. Exercise every option. Don't engage in bribery, which is what it was. It was bribery.

MARTIN SMITH: But in retrospect, they would have 50, 60 bombs by now, and they don't.

Sen. JOHN McCAIN: In retrospect—in retrospect, if they hadn't stopped doing it, we would have acted militarily. And we wouldn't be facing the magnitude of the threat that we're facing now."

=== Nuclear weapons ===
McCain voted in favor of the Nunn–Lugar Cooperative Threat Reduction in 1991. He voted to ratify the START II strategic arms limitation treaty in 1996.

McCain voted against the Comprehensive Nuclear-Test-Ban Treaty in 1999.

In March 2008, McCain said that United States should reduce its nuclear arsenal to encourage other nations to reduce their arsenals:

Forty years ago, the five declared nuclear powers came together in support of the Nuclear Nonproliferation Treaty and pledged to end the arms race and move toward nuclear disarmament. The time has come to renew that commitment. We do not need all the weapons currently in our arsenal. The United States should lead a global effort at nuclear disarmament consistent with our vital interests and the cause of peace.

=== Pakistan ===
McCain maintained a relatively moderate stance concerning Pakistan, although he has recognized the South Asian nation as an important part of US Foreign Policy. In the aftermath of Pakistan's former Prime Minister Benazir Bhutto's assassination (in December 2007) McCain appeared to rule out the option of US forces entering Pakistan, saying that it was not an appropriate time to "threaten" Pakistan.

=== Russia ===
McCain was one of the foremost Senate critics of Russian President Vladimir Putin: "I looked into his eyes and saw three letters: a K, a G and a B", referring to Putin's membership in the KGB during the Soviet era. He has said that Putin is "going to cause a lot of difficulties" and that he is "trying to reassert the Russian empire." In January 2007, McCain said that he thought Putin was using Russia's energy sources as a political weapon.

He bullies his neighbors and he wants to get a control of the energy supply of Western Europe. This is a dangerous person. And he has to understand that there's a cost to some of his actions. And the first thing I would do is make sure that we have a missile defense system in place in Czechoslovakia and Poland, and I don't care what his objections are to it.

McCain was a fierce opponent of Putin's Invasion of Chechnya describing it as "a bloody war against Chechnya's civilian population." He stated "Yes, there are Chechen terrorists, but there are many Chechens who took up arms only after the atrocities committed by Russian forces serving first under Boris Yeltsin's and then Putin's orders." Like others, he disputes that the Russian apartment bombings had anything to do with Chechens, and that instead "There remain credible allegations that Russia's FSB had a hand in carrying out these attacks". He also blamed Russia's security services for political assassinations as well as the assassinations of independent journalists.

Meanwhile, the FSB has been unable to solve the murder of leading independent journalists. It has failed to bring to justice any suspects in the murder of democratic politicians. It has not been able to identify a single case of corruption inside the Russian government. Not a single Russian has been held to account for committing crimes against humanity in the Soviet Gulag. The FSB can't do any of that – but it can arrest Mikhail Khodorkovsky. What brave men they must be to kick down the doors of a private airplane and arrest an unarmed man.

In 2005 McCain and Connecticut senator Joe Lieberman brought a draft resolution with the requirement to suspend membership of Russia in the G8, an international forum. The same year he initiated Senate acceptance of a resolution charging the Russian government with "political motivations" in litigation concerning Mikhail Khodorkovsky and Platon Lebedev. In October 2007, McCain again called for removal of Russia from the G8:

Today, we see in Russia diminishing political freedoms, a leadership dominated by a clique of former intelligence officers, efforts to bully democratic neighbors, such as Georgia, and attempts to manipulate Europe's dependence on Russian oil and gas. We need a new Western approach to this revanchist Russia. The G8 should again become a club of leading market democracies: it should include Brazil and India but exclude Russia.

McCain was a strong supporter of ballistic national missile defenses. Russia threatened to place short-range nuclear missiles on the Russia's border with NATO if the United States refuses to abandon plans to deploy 10 interceptor missiles and a radar in Poland and the Czech Republic. In April 2007, Putin warned of a new Cold War if the Americans deployed the shield in the former Eastern Bloc. Putin also said that Russia is prepared to abandon its obligations under a Nuclear Forces Treaty of 1987 with the United States.

In 2008 McCain accused Russian leader Vladimir Putin of clear aspirations of wanting to restore the czarist empire. McCain said that Putin was still running Russia, saying he is "still by far the most powerful and influential person in Russia," and that "It's very clear that Russian ambitions are to restore the old Russian Empire. Not the Soviet Union, but the Russian Empire." By attacking Georgia Russian leaders risk "the benefits they enjoy from being part of the civilized world." In his Republican nomination speech, McCain said about Russia concerning the Russian-Georgian conflict that "They invaded a small, democratic neighbor to gain more control over the world's oil supply."

In 2013, after Russian President Vladimir Putin wrote an op-ed on The New York Times in support of Syrian President Bashar al-Assad, McCain wrote a response article on Pravda.ru, accusing Russian authorities of corruption and authoritarianism. The article caused controversy, since McCain had originally intended to write his op-ed on the Communist newspaper Pravda, but had mistakenly published it on Pravda.ru, which is unconnected to the Communist Party of the Russian Federation. McCain later attempted to publish its article on the Communist Pravda as well, but the paper refused to publish it, since it was not aligned to the political positions of the Communist Party.

=== Georgia and South Ossetia War ===
During the 2008 South Ossetia war, McCain reacted strongly to Russia's widening assault against Georgia. McCain said Europe and other nations must be united against such acts, and proclaimed support for the U.S.'s closest ally among the democratizing former Soviet republics. He also pointed out that NATO should reconsider its decision to deny Georgia the fast track for NATO membership. That decision "might have been viewed as a green light by Russia for its attacks on Georgia," McCain said.

McCain also stated that Americans are supporting the "brave little nation" of Georgia against Russia's military attacks. McCain spoke with President Mikhail Saakashvili of Georgia, and told him "I know I speak for every American when I say, 'Today, we are all Georgians.'" "Russia should immediately and unconditionally cease its military operations and withdraw all forces from sovereign Georgian territory. What is most critical now is to avoid further confrontation between Russian and Georgian military forces," McCain said on August 8, 2008.

On August 8, 2008, he said "We should immediately call a meeting of the North Atlantic Council to assess Georgia's security and review measures NATO can take to contribute to stabilizing this very dangerous situation."

=== Czech Republic ===
On July 14, 2008, McCain expressed concern about Russia's reducing the energy supplies to Czech Republic: "I was concerned about a couple of steps that the Russian government took in the last several days. One was reducing the energy supplies to Czechoslovakia^{[sic]}. Apparently that is in reaction to the Czech's agreement with us concerning missile defense, and again some of the Russian now announcement they are now retargeting new targets, something they abandoned at the end of the Cold War, is also a concern."

=== Cuba ===
When McCain was running for president in 2000, he supported the normalizing of relations with Cuba, even if Fidel Castro remained in power, provided that the Cuban government did certain things to democratize Cuba. McCain compared the situation to normalizing relations with Vietnam.

=== Ukraine ===
According to JohnMcCain.com: "There is disturbing evidence Russia is already laying the groundwork to apply the same arguments used to justify its intervention in Georgia to other parts of its near abroad – most ominously in Crimea. This strategically important peninsula is part of Ukraine, but with a large ethnic Russian population and the headquarters of Russia's Black Sea Fleet at Sevastopol." "Now, I think the Russians ought to understand that we will support – we, the United States – will support the inclusion of Georgia and Ukraine in the natural process, inclusion into NATO""And watch Ukraine. This whole thing has got a lot to do with Ukraine, Crimea, the base of the Russian fleet in Sevastopol," said McCain during the first presidential debate of 2008 on September 26.

=== Egyptian demonstrations ===
McCain tweeted "Regrettably the time has come for President Mubarak to step down and relinquish power. It's in the best interest of Egypt, its people and its military."

The following morning in an interview with Good Morning America he said the following on Egypt "This virus spreading throughout the Middle East proves the universality of human yearnings, and probably the only place where you won't see these demonstrations is Iraq." He also said on Fox News to Gretta Van Susteren "This virus is spreading throughout the Middle East. The president of Yemen, as you know, just made the announcement that he wasn't running again. This, I would argue, is probably the most dangerous period of history in – of our entire involvement in the Middle East, at least in modern times. Israel is in danger of being surrounded by countries that are against the very existence of Israel, are governed by radical organizations."

=== Syrian civil war ===
During the Syrian civil war that began in 2011, McCain was a vocal supporter of the U.S. intervening militarily in the conflict on the side of the anti-government forces. He called for arming the Free Syrian Army with heavy weapons and for the establishment of a no-fly zone over the country.

== Structure of government ==
=== Judicial appointments ===
McCain was a believer in judges who would, as he sees it, "strictly interpret the Constitution," and was against what he sees as "the systemic abuse of our federal courts" by judges who "preemptively" decide American social policy.

In 1987, he supported the failed confirmation of Reagan nominee Robert Bork. He then supported and voted for the appointments of both-Bushes nominees David Souter, Clarence Thomas, John Roberts, and Samuel Alito. In 1993 and 1994, McCain voted to confirm Clinton nominees Stephen Breyer and Ruth Bader Ginsburg, whom he considered to be qualified for the Supreme Court. He would later explain that "under our Constitution, it is the president's call to make." He has made clear, though, that he never would have nominated Breyer or Ginsburg himself (or Souter or Gerald Ford appointee John Paul Stevens). He also stated some of his favorite past Supreme Court justices include Sandra Day O'Connor, William Rehnquist, and John Marshall. He has described Alito and, especially, John Roberts as currently sitting judges he likes; he said the two "would serve as the model for my own nominees if that responsibility falls to me."

For lower courts, he said he would appoint a mix of moderates and conservatives. While McCain was opposed to abortion, he said that he would not use abortion as the litmus test.

=== Gang of 14 and Senate filibuster ===
On May 23, 2005, McCain led fourteen Senators to forge a compromise on the Democrats' use of the judicial filibuster, thus eliminating the need for the Republican leadership's attempt to implement the so-called "nuclear option" (also known as the "constitutional option"). Under the agreement, Senators would retain the power to filibuster a judicial nominee, the Democrats would agree to use this power against Bush nominees only in an "extraordinary circumstance", the Republicans involved would agree to vote against the nuclear option if implemented, and three of the most contested Bush appellate court nominees (Janice Rogers Brown, Priscilla Owen and William H. Pryor Jr.) would receive a vote by the full Senate. The agreement may have affected the likelihood that a Senate minority would defeat subsequent nominations to the U.S. Supreme Court (e.g., the nominations of John Roberts and Samuel Alito). Such a defeat by a filibustering Senate minority could have become less likely if the so-called "nuclear option" had been successful, but such a defeat could have become more likely if the nuclear option had been voted down.

=== Religion and the nation ===
On February 28, 2000, during his presidential primary campaign, McCain sharply criticized leaders of the religious right as "agents of intolerance" allied to his rival, Governor George W. Bush, and denounced what he said were the tactics of "division and slander." McCain singled out the evangelists Pat Robertson and Jerry Falwell as "corrupting influences on religion and politics" and said parts of the religious right were divisive.

In an interview in March 2007, David Brody for CBN news asked McCain about these comments, "Do you regret saying it? Do you feel like you need to apologize for it at all?" to which McCain responded, ". I was angry. And sometimes you say things in anger that you don't mean. But I have put that behind me. It's over."

When interviewed in 2007 by Beliefnet, a website that covers religious affairs, McCain was asked if he thought a non-Christian should be president of the United States. He answered, "I just have to say in all candor that since this nation was founded primarily on Christian principles, personally, I prefer someone who has a grounding in my faith." McCain also stated his agreement with the belief that the U.S. is a "Christian nation." On September 30, 2007, he clarified his remarks by saying "What I do mean to say is the United States of America was founded on the values of Judeo-Christian values, which were translated by our founding fathers which is basically the rights of human dignity and human rights." McCain also stated, "I would vote for a Muslim if he or she was the candidate best able to lead the country and defend our political values."

In February 2013, McCain reiterated his belief that America was "a Judeo-Christian nation."

=== Campaign finance regulation ===
An advocate of government restrictions on campaign spending and contributions, McCain made campaign finance reform a central issue in his 2000 presidential bid. With Democratic Sen. Russ Feingold of Wisconsin he pushed the Bipartisan Campaign Reform Act of 2002 which banned unlimited donations to national political parties (soft money) and curtailed issue-advocacy ads. Because of McCain and Feingold's involvement, the law was commonly referred to as the "McCain-Feingold Act."

=== President's question time ===
In May 2008, McCain stated his intention, if elected, to create a presidential equivalent of the British constitutional convention of Prime Minister's Questions. In a policy speech on May 15 which outlined a number of ideas, McCain said, "I will ask Congress to grant me the privilege of coming before both houses to take questions, and address criticism, much the same as the Prime Minister of Great Britain [sic] appears regularly before the House of Commons."

George F. Will of The Washington Post criticized the proposal in an op-ed piece, saying that a Presidential Question Time would endanger separation of powers as the president of the United States, unlike the prime minister of the United Kingdom, is not a member of the legislature. Will ended the piece by saying, "Congress should remind a President McCain that the 16 blocks separating the Capitol from the White House nicely express the nation's constitutional geography."

== Energy and environmental policy ==
McCain had a lifetime pro-environment rating of 24 on a scale of 100 on the League of Conservation Voters's National Environmental Scorecard, which reflects the consensus of experts from about 20 leading environmental organizations. According to the League of Conservation Voters' 2006 National Environmental Scorecard, McCain took an "anti-environment" stance on four of seven environmental resolutions during the second session of the 109th congress. The four resolutions dealt with issues such as offshore drilling, an Arctic national wildlife refuge, low-income energy assistance, and environmental funding.

McCain was a member of the Honorary Board of the Republicans for Environmental Protection organization.

=== Energy ===
In a June 2008 analysis of McCain's positions, the Los Angeles Times said that "the Arizona senator has swerved from one position to another over the years, taking often contradictory stances on the federal government's role in energy policy."

==== Energy dependence ====
On April 23, 2007, McCain gave a major speech on his energy policy at the Center for Strategic and International Studies in the Ronald Reagan Building & International Trade Center in Washington, D.C. He said that U.S. dependence on foreign oil was "a major strategic vulnerability, a serious threat to our security, our economy and the well-being of our planet," explicitly connecting energy independence with national security, climate change, and the environment.

In 2008, he said that this dependence "has been thirty years in the making, and was caused by the failure of politicians in Washington to think long term about the future of the country."

McCain generally supported increased energy efficiency, but did not announce specific targets. He had called for raising gas mileage standards to 35 mpg.

==== Oil price increases ====
"I believe there needs to be a thorough and complete investigation of speculators to find out whether speculation has been going on and, if so, how much it has affected the price of a barrel of oil." "I am very angry, frankly, at the oil companies. Not only because of the obscene profits they've made, but their failure to invest in alternative energy to help us eliminate our dependence on foreign oil," McCain said on June 13, 2008.

==== Offshore drilling ====
In McCain's campaign for the presidency in 2000, he supported the federal ban on offshore drilling for oil. In June 2008, McCain reversed his longstanding objection to offshore drilling. Stating that he had changed his views because of high gas prices and dependence on imports, he endorsed legislation that would give each coastal state the power to determine whether to allow offshore drilling.

==== Oil lobby and methane emissions on public lands ====
In May 2017, McCain joined two other Republicans in voting with Democrats against the repeal of Obama's regulations on drilling in public lands. "Sen. John McCain (R-Ariz.) unexpectedly voted no against a motion to proceed with consideration of the resolution, along with GOP Sens. Susan Collins (Maine) and Lindsey O. Graham (S.C.)."

==== ANWR ====
McCain generally opposed drilling in the Arctic National Wildlife Refuge, but did vote in favor of preserving the budget for ANWR oil drilling.

==== Alternative energy sources ====
McCain voted to reduce federal funds for renewable and solar energy. He opposed tax credits in 2001 and 2006 for companies that generate power from solar, wind, geothermal and ocean wave energy.

===== Ethanol for energy =====
In 2000, McCain skipped most of the Iowa caucuses during his presidential bid, in large part because his opposition to ethanol subsidies was a nonstarter in a state where making corn into fuel was a large and profitable business.

While campaigning in 2006 in the Midwest, McCain called ethanol a "vital, vital alternative energy source."

In April 2007, McCain proposed increasing ethanol imports.

In May 2008, in response to rising food prices linked to an increased production of ethanol, McCain along with 23 other Republican Senators asked the Environmental Protection Agency to reduce requirements established by Congress in 2007 that more ethanol and other renewable fuels be blended into the U.S. gasoline supply. The group wrote:

Although many factors may contribute to high food costs, food-to-fuel mandates are the only factors that can be reconsidered in light of current circumstances.

===== Nuclear power =====
McCain voted five times in the 1990s against taxpayer aid for research on new-generation nuclear reactors. Through 2003, he opposed federal loan guarantees to help the nuclear industry finance new plants.

In 2005, McCain began supporting more taxpayer assistance for nuclear energy, as part of his proposed legislation to cap greenhouse gas emissions. In April 2007, McCain proposed better harnessing of nuclear power, much as Europe has managed to do. McCain later called for 45 new nuclear reactors to be built in the United States by 2030. In 2008, the U.S. Public Interest Research Group and Public Citizen estimated that one version of McCain's bill would authorize more than $3.7 billion in subsidies for new nuclear plants.

McCain had supported the proposed Yucca Mountain nuclear waste repository in Nevada. In 2008, however, on the eve of a campaign appearance in Nevada, he called for the establishment of "an international repository for spent nuclear fuel", which, he said, might make it unnecessary to open Yucca Mountain.

The Sierra Club, the League of Conservation Voters, and the Obama campaign have charged that, in a videotaped interview in 2007, McCain reiterated his support for transporting nuclear waste to Yucca Mountain but said he would not be comfortable with such transports going through Phoenix, Arizona. The McCain campaign responded by attacking Obama's record on energy issues.

McCain was criticized for failing to deal with nuclear waste contamination problems in his home state of Arizona.

McCain repeatedly cited France as a role model because it gets nearly 80% of its electricity from nuclear power, which helps the country to reduce its carbon dioxide emissions, and has made it one of the world's leading net exporters of energy.

=== Global warming ===
The McCain-Lieberman Climate Stewardship Act of 2003 was defeated in October 2004 by a margin of 43–55. This bill however would have required power stations to reduce their emissions to the same levels that they were in 2000, three years previous by the year 2010. An act that though stated to be "a very minimal proposal" by Senator McCain to the Senate, "that while woefully inadequate should be the first step." The Climate Stewardship and Innovation Act of 2007 was introduced by Senator Joseph Lieberman, McCain and other co-sponsors in January 2007, with McCain commenting "we continue to learn more about the science of climate change and the dangerous precedence of not addressing this environmental problem. The science tells us that urgent and significant action is needed."

In April 2007, McCain called global warming "a serious and urgent economic, environmental and national security challenge" and said that the problem "isn't a Hollywood invention."

In September 2007, McCain said that he supported a 65% reduction in carbon emissions by 2050.

In a campaign video in January 2008, McCain said "I believe that America did the right thing by not joining the Kyoto treaty, but I believe that if we could get China and India into it, then the United States should seriously consider on our terms joining with every other nation in the world to try and reduce greenhouse gases. It's got to be a global effort."

==== Cap and trade ====
McCain's position on greenhouse gas emissions called for a timetable mandated by the Environmental Protection Agency that gradually reduces greenhouse ceilings. McCain's stance also included an emission credit system that regulates each metric ton of greenhouse a company produced. This plan was to be put into effect by 2012.

McCain was a co-sponsor of a Senate cap-and-trade bill designed to limit greenhouse gas emissions, and was seen as a bipartisan leader on the issue. However, in a radio interview in February 2010, he denied ever supporting cap-and-trade.

By September 2009, McCain had largely disengaged from the climate change debate, and criticized the Waxman-Markey Climate Change Bill out of the House as "appear[ing] to be a cap & tax bill that I won't support" and having "a lot of special deals for a lot of special interests." The senator also had both substantive and procedural objections to the cap-and-trade bill being worked on in the Senate.

==== Automobile standards ====
In February 2007, McCain and Gov. Arnold Schwarzenegger called for a nationwide roll-out of California's new low carbon fuel standard. In April 2007, McCain proposed moving from exploration to production of plug-in electric vehicles.

In late June 2008, McCain said he favored nationwide limits on carbon emissions from cars, saying "my goal would be to see a federal standard that every state could embrace". In mid-July, McCain, regarding whether states such as California should be permitted to set tough greenhouse gas limits on vehicles, that "It's hard for me to tell states that they can't impose . whatever standards that would apply within their own states." He said "I guess at the end of the day, I support the states being able to do that."

=== Everglades ===
In 2007, McCain sided with Bush against Florida Republicans in opposing a Congressional override of Bush's veto of a water projects bill that would have approved $2 billion for restoration of the Everglades, despite $7.8 billion that had been earmarked for the Comprehensive Everglades Restoration Plan (CERP) in 2000. The State of Florida has, since the passing of CERP, spent $2 billion on CERP initiatives, though the federal government has declined to fund initiatives written in CERP. In 2004, a group of real estate developers, led by a major fundraiser to McCain's campaign, Al Hoffman, worked to block state efforts to follow through on restoration works. McCain said on June 4, 2008, while touring the Everglades, that he supported "adequate funding" for restoration but that it had to be achieved "without sacrificing fiscal responsibility", though he declined to state which CERP programs were irresponsible.

=== Colorado River water allocation ===
The Colorado River Compact allocates the water of the Colorado River among seven states. McCain called for renegotiating the Compact, a statement that has been interpreted as a suggestion that less water be reserved for the Upper Basin states (Colorado, Utah, New Mexico, and Wyoming) in order to provide more for the Lower Basin states (California, Arizona, and Nevada).

== Social policy ==
McCain's 2006 rating by the Almanac of American Politics (2008) on Social Policy was 46% conservative, 53% liberal. (2005: 64% conservative, 23% liberal.) McCain also has an 83% rating from the Christian Coalition, which indicates many socially conservative views such as voting yes on $75M for abstinence education, yes on recommending a Constitutional ban on flag desecration, and voting yes on memorial prayers and religious symbols at school. In 2013, the National Journal gave McCain a rating of 58% conservative and 41% liberal on Social Policy.

=== Abortion ===
McCain had indicated that he believed life begins at the moment of conception and believed that embryos should be afforded full human rights. However, McCain did support the use of embryos in stem-cell research. McCain was also endorsed by the National Right to Life Committee, an anti-abortion political action committee that opposes legal abortion. In 2012, speaking about abortion, Senator McCain said that the Republican Party should "leave the issue alone" and that he respected anti-abortion and pro-choice rights views.

In June 1984, McCain voted for H.AMDT.942, the Siljander amendment, to H.R.5490, "An amendment to define 'person' as including unborn children from the moment of conception".

In 1999, McCain said of Roe v. Wade, "I'd love to see a point where it is irrelevant, and could be repealed because abortion is no longer necessary. But certainly in the short term, or even the long term, I would not support repeal of Roe v. Wade, which would then force X number of women in America to [undergo] illegal and dangerous operations." In 2000, McCain said he would support his then-teenage daughter making her own decision about having an abortion, but later clarified saying it would be a decision made by the family.

However, on February 18, 2007, he stated, "I do not support Roe versus Wade. It should be overturned." McCain said he supports amending the U.S. Constitution to ban abortion, except in cases of rape, incest, or risk to the mother's life. In 2008, he said he would not use abortion as a litmus test for Supreme Court nominations. McCain voted in the Senate against abortion 115 out of 119 votes including co-sponsoring the Federal Abortion Ban. In 2012, John McCain voted with Democrats to allow women in the military to use their insurance coverage for an abortion in cases of rape and incest.

McCain mostly had a 0% rating from the abortion rights group, NARAL Pro-Choice America, and a 75% rating from the National Right to Life Committee (NRLC). From 2001 to 2002, National Right to Life, which opposes abortion, gave McCain a score of 33%. That was among his lowest from the organization. In 2015, and in most years since 2002, McCain received a 100% rating from National Right to Life. Conversely, McCain was rated 9% by Planned Parenthood in 2018, 33% by the abortion rights Population Connection in 2014, 29% by National Organization for Women in 2008, 20% by NARAL Pro-Choice America, and 50% by the Population Institute in 2005 which advocates for reproductive rights. In 2017, McCain received a 24% rating from NARAL Pro-Choice America, one of his highest pro-choice rights ratings.

=== Sex education and birth control ===
McCain was against federal funding of birth control and sex education; his opposition included a vote against spending $100 million to reduce teen pregnancy by education and contraceptives.

McCain voted in 2003 and 2005 against legislation requiring insurance plans that cover prescription drugs to also cover birth control.

=== LGBTQ+ and marriage issues ===
McCain had a mixed record on LGBTQ+ rights, although his positions on LGBT rights were much more liberal than most of his other Republican counterparts. McCain had said that he opposed same-sex marriage or civil unions, but "McCain, who also oppose[d] an amendment to the U.S. Constitution to ban same-sex unions, said people should be encouraged to enter into legal agreements, particularly for insurance and other areas where decisions need to be made." In 2013, he told Anderson Cooper, that he had not changed his position but McCain said: "I have admired your forward position and stand on this issue." McCain was endorsed by Log Cabin Republicans, a Republican PAC supportive of same-sex marriage and gay rights.

In 1996, McCain voted against the Employment Non-Discrimination Act (ENDA), which would have prohibited discrimination against employees on the basis of sexual orientation. When the bill was reintroduced in 2006, McCain told ABC's This Week, "I don't think we need specific laws that would apply necessarily to people who are gay." On November 7, 2013, he did vote in favor of ENDA.

In October 2006, McCain said he would consider changing the U.S. military's don't ask, don't tell policy: "The day that the leadership of the military comes to me and says, 'Senator, we ought to change the policy,' then I think we ought to consider seriously changing it." In December 2007, McCain said he supported the policy, citing reports from military leaders that "this policy ought to be continued because it's working." In January 2010, when Defense Secretary Robert M. Gates and Joint Chiefs Chairman Mike Mullen – the top civilian and uniform leadership of the military – came out in favor of repealing the policy, McCain said he was "disappointed" by their stance: "At this moment of immense hardship for our armed services, we should not be seeking to overturn the Don't ask, don't tell policy," which he described as "imperfect but effective." McCain also criticized Gates for what he saw as an attempt to usurp Congressional authority over the policy. In December 2010, McCain voted against repealing the policy.

McCain broke with his party on more than one occasion by opposing a federal ban on gay marriage. In 2004, McCain voted against the Federal Marriage Amendment, an amendment intended to ban gay marriage, arguing that each state should be able to choose whether to recognize same-sex marriage. He supported the failed 2006 Arizona initiative to ban same-sex marriage and the successful California Proposition 8. He also voted in favor of the Defense of Marriage Act of 1996 which barred the federal government from recognizing same-sex marriages. In 2006, McCain again voted against the Federal Marriage Amendment, one of seven Republicans to break with their party, reiterating that the issue should be left to the states. Senator John Cornyn, a conservative Republican from Texas, criticized the Democrats and Republicans voting against cloture saying that a 'no' vote on the motion was "a 'no' vote against traditional marriage."

When asked if he supported civil unions for homosexuals, McCain said: "I do not." Still, on The Ellen DeGeneres Show on May 22, 2008, McCain said that people ought to be able to enter "legal agreements ... particularly in the case of insurance and other areas", but that the "unique status of marriage" should be retained between a man and a woman."

In July 2008, McCain told The New York Times that "I think that we've proven that both parents are important in the success of a family so, no I don't believe in gay adoption." Two days later, McCain's Director of Communications said "McCain could have been clearer in the interview in stating that his position on gay adoption is that it is a state issue, just as he made it clear in the interview that marriage is a state issue." McCain also clarified that he does not support a federal ban on adoption by gay parents.

McCain's positions on LGBT rights had considerably moderated in his later years. In 2013, McCain criticized Russia's treatment of LGBT people. The Human Rights Campaign (HRC), which rates politicians' support for LGBT issues, gave McCain a 0% during the 114th Congress and a 25% during the 113th Congress. From 2005 to 2006, the Human Rights Campaign gave him a rating of 33%. His highest score from the HRC was a 50% from 1997 to 1998. In 2014, McCain opposed Arizona SB 1062, a proposed bill which would have amended the state's version of the federal Religious Freedom Restoration Act to allow people of faith in the state to decline services which violate their religious convictions. The bill, which elicited considerable backlash from corporations and LGBT rights activists, was perceived as a license to discriminate against LGBT Arizonans.

In April 2016, McCain supported the nomination of openly gay Eric Fanning for Secretary of the Army and he supported LGBT protections in defense bills. In July 2017, after President Donald Trump released a statement on Twitter announcing that the ban on military service by transgender individuals would be reinstated, McCain released a statement criticizing Trump's statement as "unclear" and "yet another example of why major policy announcements should not be made via Twitter," adding that "there is no reason to force service members who are able to fight, train, and deploy to leave the military—regardless of their gender identity." McCain also co-sponsored a "bill in support of transgender people serving in the military".

=== Affirmative action ===
In 1998 McCain opposed an Arizona ballot proposal to end affirmative action. He stated, "Rather than engage in divisive ballot initiatives, we must have a dialogue and cooperation and mutual efforts together to provide for every child in America to fulfill their expectations." That same year, McCain voted to keep a program which directed ten percent of federal surface transportation funds to firms owned by women and racial minorities. In 1999 McCain pushed legislation which would give companies tax breaks for selling media properties to minorities. In 2003 McCain reintroduced the legislation.

In July 2008, USA Today reported that "McCain said Sunday that he favors a proposed referendum in Arizona that would ban affirmative action, reversing a position he took a decade ago." He also said that he had always been against quotas.

=== Disability rights ===
McCain backs reauthorization of the Americans with Disabilities Act, saying in a July 26, 2008 address to the Americans with Disabilities Conference that he will support the ADA Amendments Act of 2008 passed by the House of Representatives when it comes to a Senate vote. McCain never completed a questionnaire on disability issues furnished to his campaign by the American Association of People with Disabilities.

=== Alcohol ===
McCain's family has close ties to Anheuser-Busch through its Hensley & Co. distributor. McCain recused himself from voting on bills before Congress dealing with alcohol-related matters.

=== Crime ===
McCain voted Yes on a 2004 crime bill which mandated prison terms for crimes involving firearms and stricter penalties for other gun and drug law violations.

McCain had indicated that he supported the use of the death penalty, mandatory prison terms for selling illegal drugs, and stronger restrictions on the purchase and possession of guns. McCain was a proponent of mandatory sentencing in general.

=== Domestic security ===
McCain voted in support of the USA PATRIOT Act. In a speech in Westport, Connecticut, he said that "sometimes democracies overreact" during times of national security crises, and pledged to periodically review the Patriot Act in order to safeguard civil liberties.

McCain voted to reauthorize the Patriot Act, extending the measure with some amendments clarifying the rights of an individual who has received FISA orders to challenge nondisclosure requirements and to refuse disclosure of the name of their attorney. Voting against this bill would have terminated the Patriot Act.

McCain voted to extend the Patriot Act's Wiretap Provision. This piece of legislation would allow the FBI to use roaming wiretaps on U.S. residents and would concede to the Federal Agents entry and access to corporate accounts. Voting for this bill would extend the Patriot Act to December 31, 2009, thereby making its provisions permanent whereas voting against this bill would keep the Patriot Act provisional.

In 2010, McCain cosponsored a bill, the Enemy Belligerent Interrogation, Detention and Prosecution Act, that would authorize the U.S. military to arrest anyone, U.S. citizen or otherwise, who was suspected of terrorist associations and detain them indefinitely, without right to a trial or a lawyer.

=== Conscription (the draft) ===
In 1999, when the U.S. military was experiencing significant recruiting shortfalls, McCain was one of several members of Congress who mused publicly about reinstating the draft.

In a December 2007 interview, McCain said that reinstating the draft would be a "terrific mistake" and that "the all-volunteer force is working, and it's the most professional and best trained and equipped we've ever had."

In a November/December 2007 essay in Foreign Affairs, McCain wrote, "In 1947, the Truman administration launched a massive overhaul of the nation's foreign policy, defense, and intelligence agencies to meet the challenges of the Cold War. Today, we must do the same to meet the challenges of the twenty-first century. Our armed forces are seriously overstretched and underresourced. As president, I will increase the size of the U.S. Army and the Marine Corps from the currently planned level of roughly 750,000 troops to 900,000 troops. Enhancing recruitment will require more resources and will take time, but it must be done as soon as possible."

At a town hall meeting on June 24, 2008, McCain stated, "I don't know what would make a draft happen unless we were in an all-out World War III." He further stated, "I do not believe the draft is even practicable or desirable."

In September 2007, while speaking about issuing a draft, McCain said, "One, it's the best military we've ever had, it just isn't big enough. Two, there's never been a draft that I've ever heard of since World War II that was fair. What we've done is we find rich people find a way out, and lower income people are the ones that serve. I might consider it, I don't think it's necessary, but I might consider it if you could design a draft where everybody equally would serve. But it just doesn't happen. And the other thing is that, because you know from here in Brauman, it takes intensive training with the equipment and the technical skills that now our people are required to engage in, that it makes it not conducive to a short term. Now they enlist for 4 years. We used to draft people almost for 2 years or even 18 months so it's much more difficult."

=== Education ===
McCain supported the use of school vouchers. Some of McCain's votes include voting yes on school vouchers in DC, yes on education savings accounts, yes on allowing more flexibility in federal school rules, and voting no on $5 billion for grants to local educational agencies. He supported merit pay for teachers, along with firing them if they don't meet certain standards. He sponsored the Education A-Plus bill in 1997 and again in 1999, which would have allowed parents to open tax-free savings accounts for their children's school expenses, such as tutoring, computers and books. McCain co-sponsored the Child Nutrition Act, which would provide federal funding for at-risk children. He said when running for president in 2000 that he would take $5.4 billion away from sugar, gas and ethanol subsidies and pour that money into a test voucher program for every poor school district in America. He voted against diverting $51.9 million away from the Department of Labor and putting it towards after-school community learning centers, and he voted against an amendment which would fund smaller class sizes rather than providing funds for private tutors.

In 2005, McCain announced that he supported the inclusion of intelligent design teaching in schools. He told the Arizona Daily Star that, "I think that there has to be all points of view presented. But they've got to be thoroughly presented. So to say that you can only teach one line of thinking . or one belief on how people and the world was created I think there's nothing wrong with teaching different schools of thought." In 2006 he seemed to back off the position a bit, saying, "Should [intelligent design] be taught as a science class? Probably not." McCain's 2005 book Character Is Destiny had included a highly complimentary chapter on Charles Darwin, in which McCain wrote, "Darwin helped explain nature's laws. He did not speculate, in his published theories at least, on the origin of life. The only undeniable challenge the theory of evolution poses to Christian beliefs is its obvious contradiction of the idea that God created the world as it is in less than a week."

In 2006, McCain voted to increase the Pell Grant scholarship to a maximum of $4,500, increase future math and science teacher student loan forgiveness to $23,000, and restore education program cuts slated for vocational education, adult education, GEAR UP, and TRIO. On July 29, 2007, McCain voted against a bill increasing federal student loans and Pell Grants and expanding eligibility for financial aid. In 2008, he expressed support for increasing the funding of Pell Grants, saying, "We should not burden our young men and women after college with debt."

=== Gun laws ===
In a speech before the National Rifle Association in September 2007, McCain said "For more than two decades, I've opposed the efforts of the anti-gun crowd to ban guns, ban ammunition, ban magazines, and paint gun owners as some kind of fringe group; dangerous in 'modern' America. Some even call you 'extremists.' My friends, gun owners are not extremists, you are the core of modern America." McCain was a signatory of an amicus brief (friend of the court) filed on behalf of 55 U.S. Senators, 250 Representatives and Vice-President Dick Cheney, advising that the Supreme Court case District of Columbia v. Heller be affirmed, overturning the ban on handguns not otherwise restricted by Congress.

McCain received fair to poor ratings on gun issues from the NRA Political Victory Fund, garnering a C+ in 2007. According to a review by Gun Owners of America (GOA), "in 2001, McCain went from being a supporter of anti-gun bills to being a lead sponsor". McCain's GOA rating went from a "C−" in 2000 to a "F−" in 2006. However, in 2008, he received $10 million in support from the NRA during his presidential campaign. In his 2016 election, he has received $7,740,521 from the NRA.

On April 17, 2013, McCain voted in favor of the Manchin-Toomey amendment to expand background checks for gun purchases.

=== Illegal drugs ===
McCain had said that as president he would have pushed for more money and military help to drug-supplying nations such as Colombia. He supported expanding the use of federally funded drug treatment and prevention programs and forging public/private partnerships. McCain supported the Drug Free Borders Act of 1999, which provided $1 billion to increase detection of illegal drugs entering the country and also supported the authorization of $53 million in international development funds to stop illegal narcotics.

In 1999, in a Republican presidential debate at Dartmouth College, McCain opposed the legalization of marijuana. He said, "We're losing the war on drugs. We ought to say, 'It's not a war anymore,' or we really ought to go after it. And there was a time in our history when we weren't always losing the war on drugs. It was when Nancy Reagan had a very simple program called 'Just Say No.' And young Americans were reducing the usage of drugs in America." At the debate, McCain called marijuana a "gateway drug".

=== Immigration ===
McCain had promoted the legislation and eventually the granting of citizenship to the estimated 12–20 million illegal immigrants in the United States and the creation of an additional guest worker program with an option for permanent immigration. His prominent role in promoting the Senate's 2006 immigration legislation, including an initial cosponsorhip role with Ted Kennedy, made him a focus of the debate in 2006, and his support for S.1348 did so again in 2007. The immigration issue caused intense friction within his own party, such as when The Washington Times reported that McCain and South Carolina Senator Lindsey Graham "first checked with Mr. Kennedy before deciding to vote with the Massachusetts Democrat on an amendment to the Senate bill." McCain's immigration stance was widely cited as a major reason for his presidential campaign's difficulty during most of 2007. McCain had mixed ratings from political action committees, both those in support of immigration reform and those opposed to illegal immigration; Numbers USA, which seeks to reduce illegal and legal immigration, gave McCain a 0% rating in 2018 and the Federation for American Immigration Reform, which also opposes illegal immigration and wants to reduce legal immigration, gave him a 100% rating in 2016. The American Immigration Lawyers Association, which was supportive of immigration reform, gave McCain a 100% scorecard in 2014.

In his bid for the 2000 presidential nomination, McCain supported expansion of the H-1B visa program, a temporary visa for skilled workers. In 2005, he co-sponsored a bill with Ted Kennedy that would expand use of guest worker visas.

McCain campaigned against Proposition 200, a 2004 Arizona state initiative intended to prevent illegal immigrants from voting, receiving welfare benefits, and mandated state agencies to report illegals to the federal government. McCain argued Prop 200 would be overly expensive to execute, that it would be ineffectual, and that immigration regulation falls only under the purview of the federal government.

McCain repeatedly argued that low-skilled immigrant labor was necessary to supply service roles that native-born Americans refuse. In one widely remarked-upon incident, he insisted to a union group that none of them would be willing to pick lettuce for fifty dollars an hour. The audience interrupted with offers and several weeks later demonstrators showed up at his Phoenix office to apply for lettuce picking work.

In May 2007, McCain conceded to Fox News Channel's Bill O'Reilly that passage of amnesty will permanently change the ethnic makeup of the country. He supported a path to citizenship for an estimated twelve to twenty million immigrants, on the condition of a thirteen-year waiting period.

In June 2007, McCain voted in favor of declaring English as the official language of the federal government.

McCain had subsequently stated that the nation's first priority must be to emphasize border security, and that debate over immigration was a secondary issue.

Shortly before its April 2010 passage in the Arizona State Senate, McCain supported Arizona SB1070, which gained national attention as the broadest and strictest anti-illegal immigration measure in decades within the United States. McCain also voted against the DREAM Act in 2010.

In 2013, John McCain was one of fourteen Senate Republicans to vote for a comprehensive immigration bill, a proposal offering a pathway to citizenship for some undocumented immigrants. After Trump suggested deporting DACA recipients and other Dreamers in 2017, McCain said that it was "not conscionable" to deport Dreamers. In 2018, McCain introduced a bipartisan comprehensive immigration bill, the McCain/Coons proposal, which would have offered a pathway to citizenship for DACA recipients and did not include funding for a border wall. This bill was opposed by the Trump administration.

=== Martin Luther King Holiday ===
In 1983, McCain opposed creating a federal holiday in honor of Martin Luther King Jr.

McCain continued his opposition to a holiday for King by supporting Governor of Arizona Evan Mecham's rescinding of the Arizona state holiday for King in 1987. By 1989, McCain reiterated his opposition to the federal holiday, but reversed position on the state holiday, due to the economic boycotts and image problems Arizona was receiving as a result of it not having one.

In 1990, McCain persuaded Reagan to issue a statement of support for the holiday through McCain's office, asking Arizonans to "join me in supporting a holiday to commemorate these ideals to which Dr. King dedicated his life." The 1990 referendum failed, and in 1992 McCain supported another referendum for a state holiday, which passed.

In April 2008, McCain said

We can be slow as well to give greatness its due, a mistake I made myself long ago when I voted against a federal holiday in memory of Dr. King. I was wrong and eventually realized that, in time to give full support for a state holiday in Arizona. We can all be a little late sometimes in doing the right thing, and Dr. King understood this about his fellow Americans.

=== Mixed Martial Arts ===
McCain saw a tape of the first UFC events and immediately found it abhorrent. McCain himself led a campaign to ban UFC, calling it "human cockfighting," and sending letters to the governors of all fifty US states asking them to ban the event. McCain's stance on mixed martial arts softened later in his life, commenting in 2007 that "they have cleaned up the sport," and later telling a reporter in 2014 that he would have "absolutely" tried mixed martial arts had it been around during his youth.

=== Public service ===
McCain believed that more Americans should get involved in public service. "If you find fault with our country, make it a better one . When healthy skepticism sours into corrosive cynicism, our expectations of our government become reduced to the delivery of services. For too many Americans, the idea of good citizenship does not extend beyond walking into a voting booth every two or four years and pulling a lever – and too few Americans demand of themselves even that first obligation of self-government."

=== Space program ===
McCain had expressed his strong support for NASA and the space program.

=== Stem cell research ===
McCain was a member of The Republican Main Street Partnership and supported embryonic stem cell research. McCain had earlier opposed embryonic stem cell research and credits former First Lady Nancy Reagan, a prominent Republican supporter of such research, with changing his mind in 2001. He states that he believes that stem cell research, and indeed embryonic stem cell research, will continue whether or not the U.S. sanctions it, and so it would be the wisest course of action to support it to the extent that the United States will be able to regulate and monitor the use. In July 2008 he said "At the moment I support stem cell research [because of] the potential it has for curing some of the most terrible diseases that afflict mankind."

McCain opposed embryonic stem cell research that uses cloned human embryos. In 2006 he supported a trio of U.S. Senate bills designed to increase federal funding for adult stem cell research, ban the creation of embryos for research and offer federal support for research using embryos slated for destruction by fertility clinics. In 2007, in what he described as "a very agonizing and tough decision," he voted to allow research using human embryos left over from fertility treatments.

=== Taxes on cigarettes ===
In 1998, McCain supported an unsuccessful bill that would have imposed a federal tax of $1.10 per pack on cigarettes to fund programs to cut underage smoking. "I still regret we did not succeed", he said in October 2007. In 2007, McCain voted against legislation that would have used a 61-cents-per-pack tax to expand a children's health program, saying that he disagreed with the concept: "We are trying to get people not to smoke, and yet we are depending on tobacco to fund a program that's designed for children's health?" In February 2008 he said that he would have a "no new taxes" policy as president.

=== Vaccination ===
On February 28, 2008, McCain told ABC News' Bret Hovell, "It's indisputable that autism is on the rise amongst children, the question is what's causing it. And we go back and forth and there's strong evidence that indicates that it's got to do with a preservative in vaccines." However this was before the paper published in the Lancet was officially retracted.

== See also ==
- Comparison of United States presidential candidates, 2008
- Political positions of Barack Obama
- Political positions of Sarah Palin
- Political positions of Joe Biden

Years covered	All bills sponsored	All amendments sponsored	All bills cosponsored	All amendments cosponsored	Bills originally cosponsored	Amendments originally cosponsored
2007–08	22	16	133	74	101	57
2005–06	75	68	152	42	113	36
2003–04	77	112	181	47	116	39
2001–02	54	178	121	55	97	53
1999-00	102	65	175	37	110	33
1997–98	74	150	147	59	79	50
1995–96	80	137	118	61	66	56
1993–94	53	91	201	89	98	82
1991–92	159	52	353	66	175	63
1989–90	39	24	247	86	150	81
1987–88	24	15	342	79	171	76
1985–86	12	10	335	0	117	0
1983–84	6	1	286	0	107	0
