= George Grätzer =

Hungarian-Canadian mathematician

George A. Grätzer (Hungarian: Grätzer György; born 2 August 1936, in Budapest) is a Hungarian-Canadian mathematician, specializing in lattice theory and universal algebra. He is known for his books on LaTeX and his proof with E. Tamás Schmidt of the Grätzer–Schmidt theorem.

== Biography ==
His father József Grätzer was famous in Hungary as the "Puzzle King" ("rejtvénykirály"). George Grätzer received his PhD from Eötvös Loránd University in 1960 under the supervision of László Fuchs. In 1963 Grätzer and Schmidt published their theorem on the characterization of congruence lattices of algebras. In 1963 Grätzer left Hungary and became a professor at Pennsylvania State University. In 1966 he became a professor at the University of Manitoba and later a Canadian citizen. In 1970 Grätzer became the founder and editor-in-chief of the journal Algebra Universalis. His mathematical articles—over 260, all listed on Research Gate—are widely cited, and he has written several influential books.

Grätzer has received several awards and honours. He is married and has two children (Tom Gratzer and David Gratzer) and five grandchildren.

== Awards and honours ==
- Grünwald Memorial Prize (1967)
- Steacie Prize (1971)
- Fellow of the Royal Society of Canada (1973)
- Jeffery–Williams Prize (1978)
- Zubek Prize (1987)
- Elected Foreign Member of Magyar Tudományos Akadémia (1997)

== Publications ==
More than 270 research articles in mathematics, and 36 books including

- Elmesport egy esztendőre 1959 (2008-as kiadása: ISBN 9789639725362); trans. into English as Train your brain: A year's worth of puzzles 2011
- Universal Algebra 1967
- Lattice Theory 1971
- General Lattice Theory 1978
- VP-InfoVP-Info Database Language 1986
- First Steps in LaTeX 1999
- More Math into LaTeX, sixth edition 2007
- Lattice Theory: Foundation 2011
- Practical LaTeX 2014
- The Congruences of a Finite Lattice: A Proof-by-Picture Approach, third edition 2023
- Math into LaTeX, sixth edition 2024
- Math into English, 2024
- Write Better, 2024
