= David Gratzer =

Canadian academic (born 1974)

David George Gratzer (born September 5, 1974) is a physician, columnist, author, Congressional expert witness; he was a senior fellow at both the Manhattan Institute and the Montreal Economic Institute. Though he has written essays on topics as diverse as obesity and political campaigns, he is best known for his first book, published by ECW Press, when he was just 24: Code Blue: Reviving Canada's Health Care System. That book won the Donner Prize established by the Donner Canadian Foundation and was a national bestseller in his native Canada. Gratzer is a critic of the Canadian health care system, and of U.S. President Barack Obama's health care reform proposals. Gratzer was health care policy advisor to Rudy Giuliani's 2008 presidential campaign.

== Early life ==
Gratzer born September 5, 1974, in Winnipeg, Manitoba. Gratzer's father, George, is a professor of mathematics at the University of Manitoba who emigrated from Hungary to the United States in 1963 and to Canada in 1966. Gratzer's mother, Catherine, is a retired dentist. Gratzer's older brother earned his medical degree and now practices in the United States as a psychiatrist.

Gratzer earned a B.Sc. at the University of Manitoba in 1996, was president of the University of Manitoba Students' Union (UMSU) during his final undergraduate year 1995–1996, and was appointed by the Lieutenant Governor of Manitoba to the University of Manitoba Board of Governors for four successive years from 1994 to 1998.

In his early years, Gratzer was not particularly interested in health policy issues. As he noted later:

When I grew up in Canada, I was interested in getting into medical school. If you had stopped me on the street when I was 16 or 17 and asked me about the Medical College Admission Test, I could have given you a variety of very satisfying, unique statistics on admission rates and so on. I didn't give a lot of thought to health policy. When HillaryCare was debated in the United States, I remember vaguely thinking there was something good about the idea: After all, government should be involved in health care. I had never even been to Washington, D.C.

== Medical school and Code Blue (1999) ==
Gratzer attended medical school at the University of Manitoba from 1996 to 2000 and earned an M.D. in 2000. On November 15, 1996, during his first year of medical school, the Canadian Medical Association Journal (CMAJ) published a letter to the editor from Gratzer criticizing a June 15, 1996 CMAJ report comparing reserve funds held by the Canadian Medical Protective Association (CMPA) to those held by medical malpractice insurers in the United States.

While in medical school, Gratzer was a regular contributor of opinion columns to National Post, wrote a weekly opinion column for the London Free Press and the Halifax Sunday Herald, and wrote columns on health care that appeared in several major newspapers and magazines, including the Toronto Star and Ottawa Citizen and Calgary Herald. A 1997 Gratzer column "Being a young conservative is nothing to apologize for" said "I am a conservative. This is somewhat unfortunate, as people don't seem to understand how anyone under 40 can be right-wing." A 1999 Gratzer column "Raising the minimum wage hurts the poor it hopes to help" lamented that even "two of Canada's three right-leaning governments have chosen to hike their minimum wages" and that "minimum wage earners are not underpaid but underproductive" Gratzer won $250 as fourth place runner-up in 1998–1999 and won $2,500 as first prize in the 1999–2000 Felix Morley Journalism Competition of the Institute for Humane Studies at George Mason University for his newspaper columns.

During his second year of medical school, Gratzer began writing a book about problems with the Canadian health care system but could not get anyone interested. Rejection letters piled up after he completed the book and he had doubts about his ability to get taken seriously until his third year of medical school, when Robert Lecker, professor of English at McGill University and co-founder of ECW Press agreed to publish his book. In August 1999, during his fourth year of medical school, ECW Press published the 24-year-old Gratzer's first book, Code Blue: Reviving Canada's Health Care System

Gratzer wrote about deficiencies in Canadian health care and argued that they were the direct result of the system's design, and thus not amendable to simple reforms.

The magicians believe that, with just the right combination of government regulations, medicare will magically work. The spendthrifts argue that more government spending would solve every problem—from the attitude of the grumpiest hospital orderly to the lengthiest waiting list for radiation therapy… On the surface, they seem to have little in common. Both magicians and spendthrifts, however, believe in a government-run health care system. And while they don't agree on the best way to reform medicare, they basically agree that government action will provide the solution.

Gratzer called for market-based reforms. He won praise from a former Member of Parliament, Stephen Harper, who wrote: "Gratzer proposes a workable solution for the biggest public policy problem of the coming generation—government-controlled health care monopoly… Canada needs Gratzer's solution." Harper later became the Prime Minister of Canada.

On May 4, 2000, Gratzer was awarded $25,000 by the Donner Canadian Foundation as winner of its second annual Donner Prize for best public policy book of 1999 for Code Blue.

== Residency and Better Medicine (2002) ==
In June 2000, Gratzer graduated from medical school and in July 2000 began a five-year psychiatry residency program at the University of Toronto. During his psychiatry residency, Gratzer continued to write newspaper opinion columns. A 2001 Gratzer column "Make room for prescription drug ads on television" advocated allowing direct-to-consumer advertising of prescription drugs on television in Canada (the United States and New Zealand are the only countries that allow direct-to-consumer advertising of prescription drugs).

In April 2002, ECW Press published Better Medicine: Reforming Canadian Health Care a book of essays edited by Gratzer. The collection of essays had 17 contributors from 3 countries and 2 continents. Essayists included historian Michael Bliss and columnist Margaret Wente. Dr. Victor Dirnfeld, a physician and former president of the Canadian Medical Association, wrote the introduction. Gratzer co-wrote an essay on market reforms seen in various European countries, and also wrote the concluding essay on medical savings accounts.

In September 2002, Gratzer was one of 25 Canadians under age 30 featured in a Maclean's "Leaders of Tomorrow" cover story. In 2002, while still a psychiatry resident, Gratzer joined the Manhattan Institute as a senior fellow.

In 2004, Gratzer was first author of a peer-reviewed brief report "Lifetime rates of alcoholism in adults with anxiety, depression, or co-morbid depression/anxiety: a community survey of Ontario" published in the Journal of Affective Disorders.

On June 28, 2005, Gratzer testified in support of H.R. 2355, the Health Care Choice Act of 2005, at a hearing of the U.S. House of Representatives Subcommittee on Health of the Committee on Energy and Commerce.

== Independent practice and The Cure (2006) ==
On June 30, 2005, Gratzer completed his University of Toronto psychiatry residency and became registered for independent practice of medicine in Ontario. In April 2006, Gratzer became licensed to practice medicine in Pennsylvania. In May 2006, Gratzer became board-certified in psychiatry.

In October 2006, Encounter Books published Gratzer's book, The Cure: How Capitalism Can Save American Health Care, about problems with the United States health care system.

The problem and the predicament of American health care can be stated in a single, paradoxical sentence: Everyone agrees that it's the best in the world, but nobody really likes it. On the one hand, we are so blessed with medical breakthroughs that we take them virtually for granted. Cardiac care has been revolutionized in only a few short years; death due to cardiac disease has fallen by nearly two-thirds in the past five decades. Polio is confined to the history books. Childhood leukemia, once a death sentence, is almost always curable… Yet while the quality of American medicine has never been better, angst over American health care has never been greater. The state of Medicare, the cost of prescription drugs, and the numbers of uninsured are all considered crises.

The book advocated moving health-care decisions closer to individuals and their families. Gratzer cited health savings accounts as a success story and bemoaned the state of health care in countries with government-run systems. He advocated various reforms: Gratzer proposed turning over all current federal funding for Medicaid to state governments in the form of block grants to experiment with, using welfare reform as a model; tightening Medicaid eligibility for long-term care; expanding health savings accounts; and encouraging the purchase of private long term care insurance.

In the last chapter, he proposed more far-reaching reforms while acknowledging that neither political party would currently advocate them:

1. "Making Health Insurance Portable": ending the tax exemption of employer-provided health insurance and scrapping government regulations mandating what conditions and whom and at what rates private health insurance companies must provide coverage, thereby making it easier for families to purchase health insurance through their employer, their union, or their church;
2. "Shoring up Medicare": pre-funding the program (either through individual accounts or a trust fund), and raising the Medicare eligibility age to 70;
3. "Creating a Market for Medical Progress": ending the FDA's requirement that drugs demonstrate "efficacy", and return to only requiring pre-marketing demonstration of safety.

The Foreword was written by Nobel Laureate Milton Friedman. He wrote: "David Gratzer is a practicing psychiatrist who combines firsthand knowledge of medical practice in both his native Canada and the U.S. with an independent point of view and a rare capacity for lucid exposition of complex technical material... If you want a well-written, interesting yet authoritative and thorough account of what is wrong with medicine today and how to cure American health care, this is the book for you."

The Cure was named a "Top Ten Reading Selection for 2007" by the National Chamber Foundation.

== 2008 campaign and beyond ==
On July 30, 2007, Rudy Giuliani's 2008 presidential campaign named Gratzer as one of his five key health care policy advisors, along with Hoover Institution senior fellow Dan Kessler, Hoover Institution senior fellow Scott Atlas, Pacific Research Institute president and CEO Sally Pipes, and The Moran Company founder and president Donald Moran. During the campaign, Giuliani championed interstate health-insurance markets and tax parity for non-employer purchases of health insurance, both positions favored by Gratzer.

Giuliani said that his chance of surviving prostate cancer was 82% in the US, but only 44% under socialized medicine in England. Giuliani got his facts from the Manhattan Institute, in an article by Gratzer. Many cancer experts said that Gratzer was wrong, because he incorrectly compared survival statistics. Gratzer responded by citing economist John Goodman, co-founder and president of the National Center for Policy Analysis (NCPA), by economist June O'Neill, and by U.S. Constitutional historian and health policy expert Betsy McCaughey, a former John M. Olin fellow at the Manhattan Institute. Gratzer also cited a September 2007 Lancet Oncology article which he said found superior cancer outcomes in the United States for 16 cancers when compared to European countries.

After Giuliani withdrew, Gratzer endorsed the McCain health-care proposal.

Gratzer testified several times during the recent health-care reform debates, including before the House Budget and Ways and Means Committees. In a June 2009 U.S. Congressional hearing on the issue of single-payer health care, Gratzer and U.S. Rep. Dennis Kucinich (D-OH) clashed over Canadian healthcare statistics.

According to a June 29, 2009, front-page article in Canada's National Post, "armed with a stack of statistics about patient wait lists in Canada, and a fusillade of dire warnings about the life-threatening consequences of government-managed care," Gratzer "has emerged as the go-to expert witness for GOP lawmakers hoping to sow doubt in Congress about the wisdom of embracing Mr. Obama's call for a public health insurance option to compete with private insurers."

In July 2009, he appeared on 20/20 to discuss health care.

In November 2009, Encounter Books published a short book of his criticism of the White House plans, How Obama’s Government Takeover of Health Care Will Be a Disaster.

Gratzer continues to comment and debate on health-care issues. He is founding contributor to both FrumForum (formerly NewMajority) and the Canadian version of the Huffington Post. With former Senate Majority Leader Bill Frist, he debated at the Munk Debates.

More recent work has focused on obesity. In a widely reprinted Los Angeles Times piece, he argued that society was suffering from a McVictim Syndrome with "[t]oo many pundits, public health experts and politicians are working overtime to find scapegoats for America's obesity epidemic." He rejects this: "governments can't micromanage your waistline for you. Even if governments could magically walk you to work, ban food advertising, regulate sugar out of food and suck those fat particles out of the air, in a free society you would still have the power to drive to the nearest restaurant, shake your salt shaker and order a second piece of pie. That's why understanding—and rejecting—the McVictim culture is crucial to obesity reduction policy."

== Works ==
- Code Blue: Reviving Canada's Health Care System. Toronto: ECW Press. August 1999. ISBN 1-55022-393-3.
- Better Medicine: Reforming Canadian Health Care. Toronto: ECW Press. April 2002. ISBN 1-55022-505-7. (editor)
- The Cure: How Capitalism Can Save American Health Care. New York: Encounter Books. October 2006. ISBN 1-59403-153-3. Paperback edition (May 2008) ISBN 1-59403-219-X.
- Griffiths, Rudyard, ed. (April 2009). "You want an Americanization of health care". American Myths: What Canadians Think They Know about the United States. Toronto: Key Porter Books. ISBN 978-1-55022-505-1.
- How Obama's Government Takeover of Health Care Will Be a Disaster. New York: Encounter Books. November 2009. ISBN 978-1-59403-460-2.
- Griffiths, Rudyard, ed. (November 2010). "Health Care". Munk Debates: Volume One. Toronto: House of Anansi. ISBN 978-0-88784-248-1.
