= Algebra Universalis =

- Discipline: Algebra
- Language: English
- Edited by: Fred Wehrung

Publication details
- History: 1971–present
- Publisher: Springer-Verlag
- Impact factor: 0.626 (2020)

Standard abbreviations
- ISO 4: Algebra Univers.
- MathSciNet: Algebra Universalis

Indexing
- ISSN: 0002-5240 (print); 1420-8911 (web)

Links
- Journal homepage

Algebra Universalis is an international scientific journal focused on universal algebra and lattice theory. The journal, founded in 1971 by George Grätzer, is currently published by Springer-Verlag. Honorary editors in chief of the journal included Alfred Tarski and Bjarni Jónsson.
