= Health Care Choice Act =

The Health Care Choice Act is a bill that proposes allowing health insurance companies to sell health insurance across U.S. state lines.

== Health Care Choice Act of 2005 ==
On May 12, 2005, The Health Care Choice Act of 2005, was introduced as H.R. 2355 in the U.S. House of Representatives by Rep. John Shadegg (R-AZ) and as S. 1015 in the U.S. Senate by Sen. Jim DeMint (R-SC).

H.R.2355 gained 71 Republican co-sponsors in the House (Rep. Ed Towns (D-NY) signed on as a co-sponsor a day before and withdrew as a co-sponsor two days after the hearing on the bill) and S.1015 gained 3 Republican co-sponsors in the Senate.

On June 28, 2005, a hearing on H.R 2335 was held by the House Subcommittee on Health of the Committee on Energy and Commerce with five invited witnesses.
Three witnesses testified in favor of H.R.2355:

- Robert Garcia de Posada, chairman and President of The Latino Coalition and former Director of Hispanic Affairs at the Republican National Committee under Lee Atwater
- Merrill Matthews, Jr., Director of the Council for Affordable Health Insurance (CAHI) (a research and advocacy association of health insurance companies active in the individual market)
- David Gratzer, Senior Fellow at the Manhattan Institute and a Canadian psychiatry resident

Two witnesses testified against H.R.2355:

- Mike Kreidler, Washington State Insurance Commissioner on behalf of the National Association of Insurance Commissioners
- L. Hunter Limbaugh, Chair of the Advocacy Committee of the American Diabetes Association

On July 20, 2005, the House Committee on Energy and Commerce by a vote of 24 to 23 (24 Republicans in favor, 21 Democrats and 2 Republicans opposed) ordered H.R.2355 reported favorably out of committee, which it was on February 16, 2006, and subsequently died with no further action in the full House. S.1015 died in committee.

== Health Care Choice Act of 2007 ==
On December 12, 2007, The Health Care Choice Act of 2007, was introduced as H.R. 4460 in the U.S. House of Representatives by Rep. John Shadegg (R-AZ), and as of January 17, 2008, had 43 Republican co-sponsors. This plan was analyzed by Sven R Larson in a white paper for Center for Freedom and Prosperity. Larson finds considerable cost savings from interstate health-insurance market competition.

== Health Care Choice Act of 2009 ==
On July 14, 2009, The Health Care Choice Act of 2009, was introduced as H.R. 3217 in the U.S. House of Representatives by Rep. John Shadegg (R-AZ), and as of September 7, 2009, had 5 Republican co-sponsors.

== Legislative history ==
Congress	Short title	Bill number(s)	Date introduced	Sponsor(s)	# of cosponsors	Latest status
108th Congress	Health Care Choice Act	H.R. 4662	June 23, 2004	John Shadegg (R-AZ)	40	Died in committee
109th Congress	Health Care Choice Act of 2005	H.R. 2355	May 12, 2005	John Shadegg (R-AZ)	71	Died in committee
109th Congress	Health Care Choice Act of 2005	S. 1015	May 12, 2005	Jim DeMint (R-SC)	3	Died in committee
110th Congress	Health Care Choice Act of 2007	H.R. 4460	December 12, 2007	John Shadegg (R-AZ)	63	Died in committee
110th Congress	Health Care Choice Act of 2007	S. 2477	December 13, 2007	Jim DeMint (R-SC)	8	Died in committee
111th Congress	Health Care Choice Act of 2009	H.R. 3217	July 14, 2009	John Shadegg (R-AZ)	28	Died in committee
111th Congress	Health Care Choice Act of 2009	S. 1459	July 16, 2009	Jim DeMint (R-SC)	1	Died in committee
112th Congress	Health Care Choice Act of 2011	H.R. 346	January 19, 2011	Steve Pearce (R-NM)	7	Died in committee
112th Congress	Health Care Choice Act of 2011	H.R. 371	January 20, 2011	Marsha Blackburn (R-TN)	154	Died in committee
113th Congress	Health Care Choice Act of 2013	H.R. 762	February 15, 2013	Marsha Blackburn (R-TN)	23	Died in committee
114th Congress	Health Care Choice Act of 2015	H.R. 543	January 27, 2015	Marsha Blackburn (R-TN)	18	Died in committee
114th Congress	Health Care Choice Act of 2015	S. 647	March 3, 2015	Ted Cruz (R-TX)	5	Died in committee
115th Congress	Health Care Choice Act of 2017	H.R. 314	January 5, 2017	Marsha Blackburn (R-TN)	51	Died in committee
115th Congress	Health Care Choice Act of 2017	S. 2021	October 26, 2017	Ted Cruz (R-TX)	1	Died in committee
